= Grade II* listed buildings in England =

England within the United Kingdom

This is a list of lists of Grade II* listed buildings in England.

== General list ==
- Grade II* listed buildings in Bedfordshire
- Grade II* listed buildings in Berkshire
- Grade II* listed buildings in Bristol
- Grade II* listed buildings in County Durham
- Grade II* listed buildings in the East Riding of Yorkshire
- Grade II* listed buildings in Greater Manchester
- Grade II* listed buildings on the Isle of Wight
- Grade II* listed buildings in Lancashire
- Grade II* listed buildings in Merseyside
- Grade II* listed buildings in Northumberland
- Grade II* listed buildings in Nottinghamshire
- Grade II* listed buildings in Rutland
- Grade II* listed buildings in South Yorkshire
- Grade II* listed buildings in Tyne and Wear
- Grade II* listed buildings in the West Midlands
- Grade II* listed buildings in West Sussex

== By county ==
=== Buckinghamshire ===
- Grade II* listed buildings in South Bucks
- Grade II* listed buildings in Chiltern
- Grade II* listed buildings in Wycombe
- Grade II* listed buildings in Aylesbury Vale
- Grade II* listed buildings in the Borough of Milton Keynes

=== Cambridgeshire ===
- Grade II* listed buildings in Cambridge
- Grade II* listed buildings in South Cambridgeshire
- Grade II* listed buildings in Huntingdonshire
- Grade II* listed buildings in Fenland
- Grade II* listed buildings in East Cambridgeshire
- Grade II* listed buildings in Peterborough (unitary)

=== Cheshire ===
- Grade II* listed buildings in Cheshire West and Chester
- Grade II* listed buildings in Cheshire East
- Grade II* listed buildings in Warrington
- Grade II* listed buildings in Halton (borough)

=== Cornwall ===
- Grade II* listed buildings in Cornwall (A–G)
- Grade II* listed buildings in Cornwall (H–P)
- Grade II* listed buildings in Cornwall (Q–Z)

=== Cumbria ===
- Grade II* listed buildings in Cumberland
- Grade II* listed buildings in Westmorland and Furness

=== Derbyshire ===
- Grade II* listed buildings in Amber Valley
- Grade II* listed buildings in Bolsover (district)
- Grade II* listed buildings in Chesterfield
- Grade II* listed buildings in Derby
- Grade II* listed buildings in Derbyshire Dales
- Grade II* listed buildings in Erewash
- Grade II* listed buildings in High Peak
- Grade II* listed buildings in North East Derbyshire
- Grade II* listed buildings in South Derbyshire

=== Devon ===
- Grade II* listed buildings in East Devon
- Grade II* listed buildings in Exeter
- Grade II* listed buildings in Mid Devon
- Grade II* listed buildings in North Devon
- Grade II* listed buildings in Plymouth
- Grade II* listed buildings in South Hams
- Grade II* listed buildings in Teignbridge
- Grade II* listed buildings in Torbay
- Grade II* listed buildings in Torridge
- Grade II* listed buildings in West Devon

=== Dorset ===
- Grade II* listed buildings in Bournemouth
- Grade II* listed buildings in Christchurch
- Grade II* listed buildings in Poole (borough)
- Grade II* listed buildings in East Dorset
- Grade II* listed buildings in North Dorset
- Grade II* listed buildings in Purbeck (district)
- Grade II* listed buildings in West Dorset
- Grade II* listed buildings in Weymouth and Portland

=== East Sussex ===
- Grade II* listed buildings in Hastings
- Grade II* listed buildings in Rother
- Grade II* listed buildings in Wealden
- Grade II* listed buildings in Eastbourne
- Grade II* listed buildings in Lewes (district)
- Grade II* listed buildings in Brighton and Hove

=== Essex ===
- Grade II* listed buildings in Basildon (district)
- Grade II* listed buildings in Braintree (district)
- Grade II* listed buildings in Brentwood (borough)
- Grade II* listed buildings in Castle Point
- Grade II* listed buildings in the City of Chelmsford
- Grade II* listed buildings in Colchester (borough)
- Grade II* listed buildings in Epping Forest (district)
- Grade II* listed buildings in Harlow
- Grade II* listed buildings in Maldon (district)
- Grade II* listed buildings in Rochford (district)
- Grade II* listed buildings in Southend-on-Sea
- Grade II* listed buildings in Tendring
- Grade II* listed buildings in Thurrock
- Grade II* listed buildings in Uttlesford

=== Gloucestershire ===
- Grade II* listed buildings in Cheltenham
- Grade II* listed buildings in Cotswold (district)
- Grade II* listed buildings in Forest of Dean
- Grade II* listed buildings in Gloucester
- Grade II* listed buildings in South Gloucestershire
- Grade II* listed buildings in Stroud (district)
- Grade II* listed buildings in Tewkesbury (borough)

=== Greater London ===
- Grade II* listed buildings in the City of London
- Grade II* listed buildings in the City of Westminster (1–9)
- Grade II* listed buildings in the City of Westminster (A–Z)
- Grade II* listed buildings in the Royal Borough of Kensington and Chelsea
- Grade II* listed buildings in the London Borough of Camden
- Grade II* listed buildings in the London Borough of Richmond upon Thames
- Grade II* listed buildings in the London Borough of Waltham Forest
- Grade I and II* listed buildings in the London Borough of Hammersmith and Fulham
- Grade I and II* listed buildings in the London Borough of Wandsworth
- Grade I and II* listed buildings in the London Borough of Lambeth
- Grade I and II* listed buildings in the London Borough of Southwark
- Grade I and II* listed buildings in the London Borough of Tower Hamlets
- Grade I and II* listed buildings in the London Borough of Hackney
- Grade I and II* listed buildings in the London Borough of Islington
- Grade I and II* listed buildings in the London Borough of Brent
- Grade I and II* listed buildings in the London Borough of Ealing
- Grade I and II* listed buildings in the London Borough of Hounslow
- Grade I and II* listed buildings in the Royal Borough of Kingston upon Thames
- Grade I and II* listed buildings in the London Borough of Merton
- Grade I and II* listed buildings in the London Borough of Sutton
- Grade I and II* listed buildings in the London Borough of Croydon
- Grade I and II* listed buildings in the London Borough of Bromley
- Grade I and II* listed buildings in the London Borough of Lewisham
- Grade I and II* listed buildings in the Royal Borough of Greenwich
- Grade I and II* listed buildings in the London Borough of Bexley
- Grade I and II* listed buildings in the London Borough of Havering
- Grade I and II* listed buildings in the London Borough of Barking and Dagenham
- Grade I and II* listed buildings in the London Borough of Redbridge
- Grade I and II* listed buildings in the London Borough of Newham
- Grade I and II* listed buildings in the London Borough of Haringey
- Grade I and II* listed buildings in the London Borough of Enfield
- Grade I and II* listed buildings in the London Borough of Barnet
- Grade I and II* listed buildings in the London Borough of Harrow
- Grade I and II* listed buildings in the London Borough of Hillingdon

=== Hampshire ===
- Grade II* listed buildings in Basingstoke and Deane
- Grade II* listed buildings in City of Winchester
- Grade II* listed buildings in East Hampshire
- Grade II* listed buildings in Eastleigh (borough)
- Grade II* listed buildings in Fareham (borough)
- Grade II* listed buildings in Gosport
- Grade II* listed buildings in Havant (borough)
- Grade II* listed buildings in Hart
- Grade II* listed buildings in New Forest (district)
- Grade II* listed buildings in Portsmouth
- Grade II* listed buildings in Southampton
- Grade II* listed buildings in Rushmoor
- Grade II* listed buildings in Test Valley

=== Herefordshire ===
- Grade II* listed buildings in Herefordshire (A–L)
- Grade II* listed buildings in Herefordshire (M–Z)

=== Hertfordshire ===
- Grade II* listed buildings in Three Rivers
- Grade II* listed buildings in Watford
- Grade II* listed buildings in Hertsmere
- Grade II* listed buildings in Welwyn Hatfield
- Grade II* listed buildings in Broxbourne (borough)
- Grade II* listed buildings in East Hertfordshire
- Grade II* listed buildings in Stevenage
- Grade II* listed buildings in North Hertfordshire
- Grade II* listed buildings in the City and District of St Albans
- Grade II* listed buildings in Dacorum

=== Kent ===
- Grade II* listed buildings in Ashford (borough)
- Grade II* listed buildings in City of Canterbury
- Grade II* listed buildings in Dartford (borough)
- Grade II* listed buildings in Dover (district)
- Grade II* listed buildings in Folkestone and Hythe
- Grade II* listed buildings in Gravesham
- Grade II* listed buildings in Maidstone (borough)
- Grade II* listed buildings in Medway
- Grade II* listed buildings in Sevenoaks (district)
- Grade II* listed buildings in Swale
- Grade II* listed buildings in Thanet
- Grade II* listed buildings in Tonbridge and Malling
- Grade II* listed buildings in Tunbridge Wells (borough)

=== Leicestershire ===
- Grade II* listed buildings in Melton (borough)
- Grade II* listed buildings in Charnwood (borough)
- Grade II* listed buildings in Harborough
- Grade II* listed buildings in Oadby and Wigston
- Grade II* listed buildings in Blaby (district)
- Grade II* listed buildings in Hinckley and Bosworth
- Grade II* listed buildings in North West Leicestershire
- Grade II* listed buildings in Leicester

=== Lincolnshire ===
- Grade II* listed buildings in Lincoln
- Grade II* listed buildings in North Kesteven
- Grade II* listed buildings in South Kesteven
- Grade II* listed buildings in South Holland
- Grade II* listed buildings in Boston (borough)
- Grade II* listed buildings in East Lindsey
- Grade II* listed buildings in West Lindsey
- Grade II* listed buildings in North Lincolnshire
- Grade II* listed buildings in North East Lincolnshire

=== Norfolk ===
- Grade II* listed buildings in Breckland
- Grade II* listed buildings in Broadland
- Grade II* listed buildings in Great Yarmouth
- Grade II* listed buildings in King's Lynn and West Norfolk
- Grade II* listed buildings in North Norfolk
- Grade II* listed buildings in Norwich
- Grade II* listed buildings in South Norfolk

=== North Yorkshire ===
- Grade II* listed buildings in North Yorkshire (district)
- Grade II* listed buildings in the City of York
- Grade II* listed buildings in Redcar and Cleveland
- Grade II* listed buildings in Middlesbrough (borough)
- Grade II* listed buildings in County Durham

=== Northamptonshire ===
- Grade II* listed buildings in Corby
- Grade II* listed buildings in East Northamptonshire
- Grade II* listed buildings in Kettering (borough)
- Grade II* listed buildings in Wellingborough (borough)
- Grade II* listed buildings in Daventry (district)
- Grade II* listed buildings in Northampton
- Grade II* listed buildings in South Northamptonshire

=== Oxfordshire ===
- Grade II* listed buildings in Cherwell (district)
- Grade II* listed buildings in Oxford
- Grade II* listed buildings in South Oxfordshire
- Grade II* listed buildings in Vale of White Horse
- Grade II* listed buildings in West Oxfordshire

=== Shropshire ===
- Grade II* listed buildings in Shropshire (district) (A–G)
- Grade II* listed buildings in Shropshire (district) (H–Z)
- Grade II* listed buildings in Telford and Wrekin

=== Somerset ===
- Grade II* listed buildings in Bath and North East Somerset
- Grade II* listed buildings in North Somerset
- Grade II* listed buildings in Mendip
- Grade II* listed buildings in Sedgemoor
- Grade II* listed buildings in South Somerset
- Grade II* listed buildings in Taunton Deane
- Grade II* listed buildings in West Somerset

=== Staffordshire ===
- Grade II* listed buildings in Cannock Chase (district)
- Grade II* listed buildings in East Staffordshire
- Grade II* listed buildings in Lichfield (district)
- Grade II* listed buildings in Newcastle-under-Lyme (borough)
- Grade II* listed buildings in South Staffordshire
- Grade II* listed buildings in Stafford (borough)
- Grade II* listed buildings in Staffordshire Moorlands
- Grade II* listed buildings in Stoke-on-Trent
- Grade II* listed buildings in Tamworth (borough)

=== Suffolk ===
- Grade II* listed buildings in Babergh
- Grade II* listed buildings in Ipswich
- Grade II* listed buildings in Mid Suffolk
- Grade II* listed buildings in St Edmundsbury (borough)
- Grade II* listed buildings in Forest Heath
- Grade II* listed buildings in Suffolk Coastal
- Grade II* listed buildings in Waveney

=== Surrey ===
- Grade II* listed buildings in Spelthorne
- Grade II* listed buildings in Runnymede (district)
- Grade II* listed buildings in Surrey Heath
- Grade II* listed buildings in Woking (district)
- Grade II* listed buildings in Elmbridge
- Grade II* listed buildings in Guildford (borough)
- Grade II* listed buildings in Mole Valley
- Grade II* listed buildings in Waverley, Surrey
- Grade II* listed buildings in Epsom and Ewell
- Grade II* listed buildings in Reigate and Banstead
- Grade II* listed buildings in Tandridge (district)

=== Warwickshire ===
- Grade II* listed buildings in North Warwickshire
- Grade II* listed buildings in Nuneaton and Bedworth
- Grade II* listed buildings in Rugby (borough)
- Grade II* listed buildings in Stratford-on-Avon (district)
- Grade II* listed buildings in Warwick (district)

=== West Yorkshire ===
- Grade II* listed buildings in Leeds
- Grade II* listed buildings in Wakefield
- Grade II* listed buildings in Kirklees
- Grade II* listed buildings in Calderdale
- Grade II* listed buildings in Bradford

=== Wiltshire ===
- Grade II* listed buildings in Wiltshire (A–G)
- Grade II* listed buildings in Wiltshire (H–O)
- Grade II* listed buildings in Wiltshire (P–Z)

=== Worchestershire ===
- Grade II* listed buildings in Worcester
- Grade II* listed buildings in Malvern Hills (district)
- Grade II* listed buildings in Wyre Forest (district)
- Grade II* listed buildings in Bromsgrove (district)
- Grade II* listed buildings in Redditch
- Grade II* listed buildings in Wychavon

== See also ==
- List of castles in England
- List of abbeys and priories in England
- List of country houses in the United Kingdom#England
- List of English Renaissance theatres
- Listed buildings in Scotland
- Listed buildings in Wales
- Listed buildings in Northern Ireland
