= Grade II* listed buildings in Hampshire =

Hampshire shown within England

The county of Hampshire is divided into 13 districts. The districts of Hampshire are Gosport, Fareham, Winchester, Havant, East Hampshire, Hart, Rushmoor, Basingstoke and Deane, Test Valley, Eastleigh, New Forest, Southampton, and Portsmouth.

As there are 549 Grade II* listed buildings in the county they have been split into separate lists for each district.

- Grade II* listed buildings in Basingstoke and Deane
- Grade II* listed buildings in City of Winchester
- Grade II* listed buildings in East Hampshire
- Grade II* listed buildings in Eastleigh (borough)
- Grade II* listed buildings in Fareham (borough)
- Grade II* listed buildings in Gosport
- Grade II* listed buildings in Havant (borough)
- Grade II* listed buildings in Hart
- Grade II* listed buildings in New Forest (district)
- Grade II* listed buildings in Portsmouth
- Grade II* listed buildings in Southampton
- Grade II* listed buildings in Rushmoor
- Grade II* listed buildings in Test Valley

== See also ==
- Grade I listed buildings in Hampshire
- Category:Grade II* listed buildings in Hampshire
