= Grade II* listed buildings in Lincolnshire =

Lincolnshire shown within England

The county of Lincolnshire is divided into nine districts. The districts of Lincolnshire are Lincoln, North Kesteven, South Kesteven, South Holland, Boston, East Lindsey, West Lindsey, North Lincolnshire, and North East Lincolnshire.

As there are 583 Grade II* listed buildings in the county they have been split into separate lists for each district.

- Grade II* listed buildings in Lincoln
- Grade II* listed buildings in North Kesteven
- Grade II* listed buildings in South Kesteven
- Grade II* listed buildings in South Holland
- Grade II* listed buildings in Boston (borough)
- Grade II* listed buildings in East Lindsey
- Grade II* listed buildings in West Lindsey
- Grade II* listed buildings in North Lincolnshire
- Grade II* listed buildings in North East Lincolnshire

== See also ==
- Grade I listed buildings in Lincolnshire
