= Grade II* listed buildings in Hertfordshire =

Hertfordshire shown within England

The county of Hertfordshire is divided into ten districts. The districts of Hertfordshire are Three Rivers, Watford, Hertsmere, Welwyn Hatfield, Broxbourne, East Hertfordshire, Stevenage, North Hertfordshire, St Albans, and Dacorum.

As there are 472 Grade II* listed buildings in the county they have been split into separate lists for each district.

- Grade II* listed buildings in Three Rivers
- Grade II* listed buildings in Watford
- Grade II* listed buildings in Hertsmere
- Grade II* listed buildings in Welwyn Hatfield
- Grade II* listed buildings in Broxbourne (borough)
- Grade II* listed buildings in East Hertfordshire
- Grade II* listed buildings in Stevenage
- Grade II* listed buildings in North Hertfordshire
- Grade II* listed buildings in the City and District of St Albans
- Grade II* listed buildings in Dacorum

== See also ==
- Grade I listed buildings in Hertfordshire
- Category:Grade II* listed buildings in Hertfordshire
