= Grade II* listed buildings in West Lindsey =

There are over 20,000 Grade II* listed buildings in England. This page is a list of these buildings in the district of West Lindsey in Lincolnshire.

== West Lindsey ==
Name	Location	Type	Completed (Note: The date given is the date used by Historic England as significant for the initial building or that of an important part in the structure's description.)	Date designated	Grid ref. (Note: The grid reference is based on the British national grid reference system, sometimes known as OSGB36, used by the Ordnance Survey.) Geo-coordinates	Entry number (Note: The "List Entry Number" is a unique number assigned to each listed building and scheduled monument by Historic England.)	Image
Birch Tree Farmhouse	Bardney, West Lindsey	Farmhouse	15th century	30 November 1966	TF1148070370; 53°13′07″N 0°19′55″W	1064010	Upload Photo
Church of St Peter	Bishop Norton, West Lindsey	Parish Church	1737	1 November 1966	SK9836392684; 53°25′18″N 0°31′17″W	1064181	Church of St Peter More images
Blyborough Hall	Blyborough, West Lindsey	Country House	Early 18th century	25 October 1951	SK9320394547; 53°26′22″N 0°35′54″W	1063376	Upload Photo
Church of St Cuthbert	Brattleby, West Lindsey	Parish Church	Late 11th century	30 November 1966	SK9473880800; 53°18′56″N 0°34′46″W	1063378	Church of St Cuthbert More images
Conservatory	Brocklesby Park, Brocklesby	Conservatory	c. 1785	24 January 1985	TA1371011310; 53°35′10″N 0°17′01″W	1063409	Upload Photo
Garden Urn	Brocklesby Park, Brocklesby	Garden Ornament	Late 18th century	24 January 1985	TA1359211336; 53°35′11″N 0°17′08″W	1165456	Upload Photo
Gateway to House	Brocklesby Park, Brocklesby	Gate Pier	Late 18th century	24 January 1985	TA1365911444; 53°35′14″N 0°17′04″W	1165475	Upload Photo
Main Stable Block	Brocklesby Park, Brocklesby	Stable	Late 17th century	1 November 1966	TA1367311445; 53°35′14″N 0°17′03″W	1063413	Upload Photo
Newsham Lodge	Brocklesby Park, Brocklesby	Gate Lodge	Early 19th century	1 November 1966	TA1261612735; 53°35′57″N 0°17′59″W	1166070	Newsham Lodge More images
The Arabella Aufrere Temple	Brocklesby Park, Brocklesby	Garden Temple	c. 1787	1 November 1966	TA1377410319; 53°34′38″N 0°16′59″W	1166061	The Arabella Aufrere Temple More images
The Orangery	Brocklesby Park, Brocklesby	Orangery	Late 18th century	1 November 1966	TA1361711380; 53°35′12″N 0°17′06″W	1317308	Upload Photo
Burton Hall	Burton, West Lindsey	Country House	1768	11 June 1985	SK9596574384; 53°15′28″N 0°33′47″W	1147084	Upload Photo
Church of St Vincent	Burton, West Lindsey	Parish Church	12th century	30 November 1966	SK9617174590; 53°15′35″N 0°33′35″W	1308689	Church of St Vincent More images
Church of St Michael	Buslingthorpe, West Lindsey	Parish Church	13th century	1 November 1966	TF0803485155; 53°21′08″N 0°22′42″W	1359510	Church of St Michael More images
Church of St Nicholas	Cabourne, West Lindsey	Parish Church	11th century	1 November 1966	TA1397801914; 53°30′06″N 0°16′59″W	1359766	Church of St Nicholas More images
Gravestone at Church of St Nicholas, 8 Paces from East End of Church	Caenby, West Lindsey	Grave Slab	Late 13th century	22 February 1985	TF0001489294; 53°23′28″N 0°29′51″W	1064184	Upload Photo
Church of St and Michael and All Angels	Cammeringham, West Lindsey	Parish Church	c. 1175	30 November 1966	SK9479482121; 53°19′39″N 0°34′41″W	1063342	Church of St and Michael and All Angels More images
Manor House	Cammeringham, West Lindsey	Moat	Medieval	30 November 1966	SK9490282217; 53°19′42″N 0°34′35″W	1165919	Upload Photo
Number 49 Gate and Railings	East Stockwith, West Lindsey	House	1985	23 May 1985	SK7885494570; 53°26′31″N 0°48′52″W	1359419	Number 49 Gate and Railings More images
Church of St Andrew	Fillingham, West Lindsey	Parish Church	c. 1180	16 December 1964	SK9480185914; 53°21′42″N 0°34′37″W	1359847	Church of St Andrew More images
Gateway, Entrance Lodges and Wall to Fillingham Castle	Fillingham, West Lindsey	Gate	c. 1775	16 December 1964	SK9687786051; 53°21′45″N 0°32′44″W	1309134	Gateway, Entrance Lodges and Wall to Fillingham Castle More images
Monument 10m south of Chancel of Church of St Andrew	Fillingham, West Lindsey	Commemorative Monument	1856	22 February 1985	SK9479785902; 53°21′41″N 0°34′37″W	1309113	Upload Photo
County Court Buildings	Gainsborough, West Lindsey	County Court	1759	12 May 1977	SK8163489913; 53°23′59″N 0°46′25″W	1063525	County Court Buildings More images
Elswitha Hall	Gainsborough, West Lindsey	Town House	18th century	4 April 1964	SK8136889851; 53°23′57″N 0°46′40″W	1063547	Elswitha Hall More images
Gatepiers to Elswitha Hall	Gainsborough, West Lindsey	Gate Pier	18th century	12 May 1977	SK8136189852; 53°23′57″N 0°46′40″W	1359751	Gatepiers to Elswitha Hall
Parish Church of St Paul	Morton, Gainsborough, West Lindsey	Parish Church	1891	12 May 1977	SK8099191461; 53°24′50″N 0°46′59″W	1063516	Parish Church of St Paul More images
Burton Chateau	Gate Burton, West Lindsey	Temple	1747	16 December 1964	SK8299783419; 53°20′28″N 0°45′18″W	1064085	Burton Chateau More images
Gate Burton Hall	Gate Burton, West Lindsey	House	1985	16 October 1979	SK8369183040; 53°20′16″N 0°44′40″W	1359458	Gate Burton Hall More images
Bridge over Lakes at Norton Place	Glentham, West Lindsey	Bridge	1776	1 November 1966	SK9720990505; 53°24′09″N 0°32′22″W	1165038	Upload Photo
Church of St Michael	Glentworth, West Lindsey	Church	Late 11th century	16 December 1964	SK9458488106; 53°22′53″N 0°34′46″W	1309078	Church of St Michael More images
Glentworth Hall	Glentworth, West Lindsey	Country House	c. 1566	25 October 1951	SK9436388222; 53°22′57″N 0°34′58″W	1063348	Glentworth Hall More images
Church of St George	Goltho, West Lindsey	Parish Church	c. 1640	30 November 1966	TF1162677501; 53°16′58″N 0°19′38″W	1308371	Church of St George More images
Church of All Hallows	Clixby, Grasby, West Lindsey	Parish Church	13th century	1 November 1966	TA1023904339; 53°31′27″N 0°20′19″W	1359798	Church of All Hallows More images
Church of St Radegund	Grayingham, West Lindsey	Parish Church	c. 1185	16 December 1964	SK9354396180; 53°27′15″N 0°35′34″W	1063350	Church of St Radegund More images
Church of All Saints	Greetwell, West Lindsey	Parish Church	11th century	30 November 1966	TF0135471532; 53°13′52″N 0°28′59″W	1064023	Church of All Saints More images
Church of St Michael	Hackthorn, West Lindsey	Parish Church	12th century	30 November 1966	SK9910482361; 53°19′44″N 0°30′48″W	1359449	Church of St Michael More images
Church of All Saints	Hemswell, West Lindsey	Parish Church	Early 13th century	16 December 1964	SK9305090924; 53°24′25″N 0°36′06″W	1166242	Church of All Saints More images
Holton Hall	Holton le Moor, West Lindsey	Country House	1785	1 November 1966	TF0835497802; 53°27′57″N 0°22′09″W	1309110	Upload Photo
Gateway at Kettlethorpe Hall, Mounting Block, Garden Wall and Gate Piers	Kettlethorpe, West Lindsey	Gate	14th century	16 December 1964	SK8481775625; 53°16′15″N 0°43′47″W	1147172	Gateway at Kettlethorpe Hall, Mounting Block, Garden Wall and Gate Piers More images
Church of St Mary	Knaith, West Lindsey	Church	11th century	16 December 1964	SK8279184617; 53°21′07″N 0°45′28″W	1064050	Church of St Mary More images
Church of St Thomas	Market Rasen, West Lindsey	Church	12th century	31 January 1952	TF1065089227; 53°23′18″N 0°20′16″W	1165917	Church of St Thomas More images
Methodist Centenary Chapel	Market Rasen, West Lindsey	Nonconformist Chapel	1863	16 May 1984	TF1073088921; 53°23′08″N 0°20′12″W	1063444	Methodist Centenary Chapel More images
Church of St Peter	Middle Rasen, West Lindsey	Parish Church	12th century	1 November 1966	TF0873089519; 53°23′29″N 0°21′59″W	1166238	Church of St Peter More images
Willow Bank Gate and Railings	Morton, West Lindsey	House	c. 1720	16 December 1964	SK8069391524; 53°24′52″N 0°47′15″W	1064171	Upload Photo
Church of St John the Baptist	Nettleton, West Lindsey	Parish Church	11th century	1 November 1966	TA1111100196; 53°29′12″N 0°19′37″W	1063424	Church of St John the Baptist More images
Church of St Peter	Newton on Trent, West Lindsey	Parish Church	12th century	16 December 1964	SK8329374409; 53°15′37″N 0°45′10″W	1064109	Church of St Peter More images
Church of St Peter	Normanby le Wold, West Lindsey	Parish Church	Early 13th century	1 November 1966	TF1229994738; 53°26′15″N 0°18′39″W	1359768	Church of St Peter More images
Church of St Luke	North Carlton, West Lindsey	Parish Church	15th century	30 November 1966	SK9455377639; 53°17′14″N 0°34′59″W	1064070	Church of St Luke More images
Church of St Andrew	Kirkby cum Osgodby, West Lindsey	Parish Church	Early 13th century	1 November 1966	TF0632892780; 53°25′16″N 0°24′05″W	1166092	Church of St Andrew More images
Church of All Saints	Thornton le Moor, Owersby, West Lindsey	Parish Church	11th century	1 November 1966	TF0494196231; 53°27′09″N 0°25′16″W	1063439	Church of All Saints More images
Church of All Saints	Pilham, West Lindsey	Church	19th century	16 December 1964	SK8624293805; 53°26′02″N 0°42′12″W	1317137	Church of All Saints More images
Church of St Oswald	Rand, West Lindsey	Parish Church	12th century	30 November 1966	TF1069779073; 53°17′49″N 0°20′26″W	1308352	Church of St Oswald More images
Church of St Peter and St Paul	Reepham, West Lindsey	Parish Church	Early 13th century	30 November 1966	TF0384973882; 53°15′06″N 0°26′42″W	1064025	Church of St Peter and St Paul More images
Church of St Edmund	Riby, West Lindsey	Parish Church	12th century	1 November 1966	TA1846507484; 53°33′02″N 0°12′48″W	1146937	Church of St Edmund More images
Parish Church of St Mary	Riseholme, West Lindsey	Parish Church	1850	30 November 1966	SK9836475665; 53°16′08″N 0°31′36″W	1064120	Parish Church of St Mary More images
The Old Hall	Saxilby with Ingleby, West Lindsey	Timber Framed House	Late 15th century	11 June 1985	SK8911675620; 53°16′12″N 0°39′55″W	1064072	Upload Photo
Church of St John the Baptist	Scampton, West Lindsey	Parish Church	14th century	30 November 1966	SK9480979475; 53°18′13″N 0°34′43″W	1359492	Church of St John the Baptist More images
Church of St Germain	Scothern, West Lindsey	Parish Church	c. 1200	30 November 1966	TF0334977410; 53°17′01″N 0°27′05″W	1064122	Church of St Germain More images
Manor House	Scotter, West Lindsey	House	19th century	5 February 1991	SE8873400899; 53°29′50″N 0°39′50″W	1064137	Upload Photo
The Old Manor House	Scotter, West Lindsey	House	Early 18th century	16 December 1964	SE8875701066; 53°29′56″N 0°39′48″W	1064134	The Old Manor House More images
Church of Saint Margaret	Somerby, West Lindsey	Church	13th century	1 November 1966	TA0623706626; 53°32′44″N 0°23′53″W	1359824	Church of Saint Margaret More images
Church of St Andrew	Stainfield, West Lindsey	Sundial	1711	30 November 1966	TF1119073208; 53°14′39″N 0°20′07″W	1359526	Church of St Andrew More images
Church of St Edward the Confessor	Sudbrooke, West Lindsey	Parish Church	1860	30 November 1966	TF0310476090; 53°16′18″N 0°27′19″W	1064127	Church of St Edward the Confessor More images
Church of Holy Trinity	Swallow, West Lindsey	Parish Church	Early 12th century	21 December 1984	TA1761303029; 53°30′39″N 0°13′40″W	1165346	Church of Holy Trinity More images
Church of St Nicholas	Cuxwold, West Lindsey	Church	c. 1100	1 November 1966	TA1719901111; 53°29′37″N 0°14′06″W	1165350	Church of St Nicholas More images
Swinhope House	Swinhope, West Lindsey	Country House	1785	1 November 1966	TF2130096311; 53°26′59″N 0°10′30″W	1063508	Swinhope House More images
Watermill and attached Outhouse	Tealby, West Lindsey	Feed Mill	17th century	1 November 1966	TF1503590023; 53°23′40″N 0°16′17″W	1165464	Watermill and attached Outhouse
Church of All Saints	Croxby, Thoresway, West Lindsey	Church	12th century	1 November 1966	TF1897198266; 53°28′04″N 0°12′33″W	1063478	Church of All Saints More images
Croxby Hall	Thoresway, West Lindsey	Country House	c. 1730	1 November 1966	TF1897098134; 53°27′59″N 0°12′34″W	1359756	Upload Photo
Church of St. Michael	Toft Newton, West Lindsey	Parish Church	12th century	1 November 1966	TF0510487358; 53°22′21″N 0°25′18″W	1166203	Church of St. Michael More images
Church of St Peter	Torksey, West Lindsey	Parish Church	Early 13th century	16 December 1964	SK8369978951; 53°18′03″N 0°44′44″W	1064078	Church of St Peter More images
Torksey Viaduct over River Trent	Torksey, West Lindsey	Railway Bridge	1847-1849	11 June 1985	SK8354079179; 53°18′11″N 0°44′52″W	1359456	Torksey Viaduct over River Trent More images
Church of All Saints	Upton, West Lindsey	Parish Church	Mid 11th century	16 December 1964	SK8685586744; 53°22′14″N 0°41′46″W	1146810	Church of All Saints More images
Church of St Mary and St Peter	Waddingham, West Lindsey	Parish Church	13th century	1 November 1966	SK9873996355; 53°27′17″N 0°30′52″W	1359451	Church of St Mary and St Peter More images
Church of St Mary	Walesby, West Lindsey	Parish Church	1914	1 November 1966	TF1328992294; 53°24′55″N 0°17′49″W	1063483	Church of St Mary More images
Church of St Mary	Welton, West Lindsey	Parish Church	13th century	30 November 1966	TF0114179765; 53°18′19″N 0°29′01″W	1359439	Church of St Mary More images
Packhorse Bridge over River Rase	West Rasen, West Lindsey	Packhorse Bridge	15th century	1 November 1966	TF0631589266; 53°23′22″N 0°24′10″W	1063403	Packhorse Bridge over River Rase More images
Church of St Peter and St Lawrence	Wickenby, West Lindsey	Parish Church	12th century	30 November 1966	TF0880281959; 53°19′24″N 0°22′05″W	1359477	Church of St Peter and St Lawrence More images
