= Grade II* listed buildings in Redditch =

Worcestershire shown within England

There are over 20,000 Grade II* listed buildings in England. This page is a list of these buildings in the district of Redditch in Worcestershire.

== Redditch ==
Name	Location	Type	Completed (Note: The date given is the date used by Historic England as significant for the initial building or that of an important part in the structure's description.)	Date designated	Grid ref. (Note: Sometimes known as OSGB36, the grid reference is based on the British national grid reference system used by the Ordnance Survey.) Geo-coordinates	Entry number (Note: The "List Entry Number" is a unique number assigned to each listed building and scheduled monument by Historic England.)	Image
Church of St John the Baptist	Feckenham, Redditch	Parish Church	12th century	10 April 1954	SP0091161648; 52°15′11″N 1°59′17″W	1167686	Church of St John the Baptist More images
Lanehouse Farmhouse	Feckenham, Redditch	Farmhouse	1550	28 November 1986	SP0238164340; 52°16′38″N 1°57′59″W	1100024	Upload Photo
Middle Beanhall Farmhouse	Bradley Green, Feckenham, Redditch	Farmhouse	Early 16th century	10 April 1954	SO9902460824; 52°14′44″N 2°00′57″W	1348639	Middle Beanhall Farmhouse More images
The Manor	Feckenham, Redditch	House	Late 16th century	10 April 1954	SP0066261366; 52°15′02″N 1°59′30″W	1348645	The Manor
White House Farmhouse	Feckenham, Redditch	Farmhouse	c. 1640	10 April 1954	SP0219764454; 52°16′42″N 1°58′09″W	1167023	Upload Photo
Church of St Peter	Ipsley, Redditch	Church	13th century	10 April 1954	SP0652866548; 52°17′49″N 1°54′21″W	1100022	Church of St Peter More images
Holmwood House	Holmwood, Redditch	Country House	1893	16 July 1987	SP0340867187; 52°18′10″N 1°57′05″W	1348660	Upload Photo
Lovelyne Farmhouse	Redditch	Farmhouse	Late 16th century	4 December 1973	SP0282164372; 52°16′39″N 1°57′36″W	1166986	Upload Photo
Shurnock Court	Redditch	House	17th century	28 November 1986	SP0263460882; 52°14′46″N 1°57′46″W	1099994	Shurnock Court More images
Tookeys Farmhouse	Astwood Bank, Redditch	Farmhouse	16th century	10 April 1954	SP0401961842; 52°15′17″N 1°56′33″W	1100061	Upload Photo
