= Pilham =

Village and civil parish in the West Lindsey district of Lincolnshire, England

Coordinates: 53.43342°N 0.70379°W

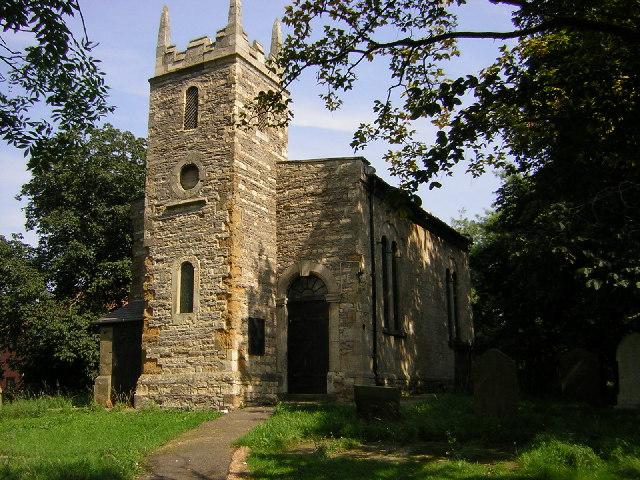
- All Saints' Church, Pilham

- Location within Lincolnshire
- Population: 76 (2001)
- OS grid reference: SK8693
- District: West Lindsey
- Shire county: Lincolnshire
- Region: East Midlands
- Country: England
- Sovereign state: United Kingdom
- Post town: GAINSBOROUGH
- Postcode district: DN21
- Police: Lincolnshire
- Fire: Lincolnshire
- Ambulance: East Midlands
- UK Parliament: Gainsborough

Pilham is a village and civil parish in the West Lindsey district of Lincolnshire, England. The population of the civil parish at the 2001 census was 76. Pilham is mentioned in the Domesday Book (1086) as Pileham.
