= Grade II* listed buildings in East Lindsey =

There are over 20,000 Grade II* listed buildings in England. This page is a list of these buildings in the district of East Lindsey in Lincolnshire.

== East Lindsey ==
Name	Location	Type	Completed (Note: The date given is the date used by Historic England as significant for the initial building or that of an important part in the structure's description.)	Date designated	Grid ref. (Note: The grid reference is based on the British national grid reference system, sometimes known as OSGB36, used by the Ordnance Survey.) Geo-coordinates	Entry number (Note: The "List Entry Number" is a unique number assigned to each listed building and scheduled monument by Historic England.)	Image
Hanby Hall	Alford, East Lindsey	House	Early 18th century	20 May 1953	TF4555376017; 53°15′40″N 0°10′50″E	1308757	Hanby Hall More images
The Manor House	Alford, East Lindsey	House	17th century	20 May 1953	TF4537176045; 53°15′41″N 0°10′41″E	1063001	The Manor House More images
Watermill	Alvingham, East Lindsey	Watermill	1155	9 March 1967	TF3664791402; 53°24′06″N 0°03′14″E	1063077	Watermill More images
Church of St Peter and St Paul	Ashby with Scremby, East Lindsey	Parish Church	1733	3 February 1967	TF4431867726; 53°11′13″N 0°09′30″E	1063620	Church of St Peter and St Paul More images
Church of St Peter	Asterby, East Lindsey	Parish Church	Mid 14th century	14 September 1966	TF2639079514; 53°17′51″N 0°06′18″W	1063682	Church of St Peter More images
Church of St Andrew	Beesby with Saleby, East Lindsey	Parish Church	13th century	9 March 1967	TF4641380227; 53°17′56″N 0°11′44″E	1308650	Church of St Andrew More images
Church of St John the Baptist	Belleau, East Lindsey	Parish Church	13th century	9 March 1967	TF4011478549; 53°17′07″N 0°06′01″E	1063630	Church of St John the Baptist More images
Pigeoncote to Manor Farm	Belleau, East Lindsey	Dovecote	Early 16th century	6 June 1952	TF4019978554; 53°17′08″N 0°06′06″E	1063631	Pigeoncote to Manor Farm More images
Church of the Holy Trinity	Bilsby, East Lindsey	Parish Church	15th century	3 February 1967	TF4664676716; 53°16′02″N 0°11′51″E	1360007	Church of the Holy Trinity More images
Cross in Churchyard of St Mary and St Gabriel	Binbrook, East Lindsey	Cross	14th century	24 February 1986	TF2117693924; 53°25′41″N 0°10′40″W	1147865	Upload Photo
Church of St Peter and St Paul	Bolingbroke, East Lindsey	Parish Church	c. 1360	3 February 1967	TF3495165136; 53°09′58″N 0°01′02″E	1359705	Church of St Peter and St Paul More images
Brackenborough Hall	Brackenborough with Little Grimsby, East Lindsey	Country House	17th century	6 June 1952	TF3296290608; 53°23′44″N 0°00′07″W	1165515	Brackenborough Hall More images
Church of St Peter and St Paul	Bratoft, East Lindsey	Parish Church	Early 14th century	3 February 1967	TF4746065020; 53°09′43″N 0°12′15″E	1267661	Church of St Peter and St Paul More images
Cross in Churchyard of Church of St Philip	Brinkhill, East Lindsey	Cross	14th century	3 February 1967	TF3721973720; 53°14′34″N 0°03′17″E	1359715	Cross in Churchyard of Church of St Philip More images
Church of St. Margaret	Bucknall, East Lindsey	Church	13th century	14 September 1966	TF1690068863; 53°12′14″N 0°15′05″W	1359927	Church of St. Margaret More images
Church of St Helen	Burgh on Bain, East Lindsey	Parish Church	11th century	9 March 1967	TF2225186406; 53°21′37″N 0°09′52″W	1359948	Church of St Helen More images
Church of St Faith	Calcethorpe with Kelstern, East Lindsey	Parish Church	14th century	9 March 1967	TF2514989897; 53°23′28″N 0°07′10″W	1307119	Church of St Faith More images
Church of St Peter	Gunby Park, Candlesby with Gunby, East Lindsey	Parish Church	Before 1870	3 February 1967	TF4687666826; 53°10′42″N 0°11′47″E	1359687	Church of St Peter More images
Western Stable Block, Gunby Hall	Gunby Park, Candlesby with Gunby, East Lindsey	Stable	1736	3 February 1967	TF4671566932; 53°10′45″N 0°11′38″E	1063657	Western Stable Block, Gunby Hall
Claxby Hall	Claxby St Andrew, East Lindsey	House	Mid 18th century	3 February 1967	TF4533671472; 53°13′14″N 0°10′31″E	1063661	Upload Photo
Church of St Bartholomew	Covenham St Bartholomew, East Lindsey	Bell Tower	1823	9 September 1967	TF3391194552; 53°25′51″N 0°00′51″E	1063108	Church of St Bartholomew More images
Church of St Mary	Covenham St. Mary, East Lindsey	Parish Church	c. 1359	9 September 1967	TF3396594324; 53°25′43″N 0°00′53″E	1063109	Church of St Mary More images
Church of St Andrew	Donington on Bain, East Lindsey	Parish Church	12th century	9 March 1967	TF2356482974; 53°19′45″N 0°08′46″W	1063688	Church of St Andrew More images
Chain Home Transmitter Tower, former RAF Stenigot	Donington on Bain, East Lindsey	Tower	1939	22 January 1997	TF2568182555; 53°19′30″N 0°06′52″W	1259301	Chain Home Transmitter Tower, former RAF Stenigot More images
Church of St Mary	East Barkwith, East Lindsey	Parish Church	Early 12th century	6 February 1986	TF1657981490; 53°19′03″N 0°15′05″W	1063096	Church of St Mary More images
Church of St Helen	East Keal, East Lindsey	Church	1681	3 February 1967	TF3825463937; 53°09′17″N 0°03′58″E	1166170	Church of St Helen More images
Church of St Nicholas	East Kirkby, East Lindsey	Parish Church	13th century	3 February 1967	TF3327863042; 53°08′52″N 0°00′31″W	1168096	Church of St Nicholas More images
Church of All Saints	Elkington, East Lindsey	Parish Church	13th century	9 March 1967	TF2935188307; 53°22′33″N 0°03′25″W	1359950	Church of All Saints More images
Thorpe Hall	Elkington, East Lindsey	Country House	1584	6 June 1952	TF3177087193; 53°21′55″N 0°01′16″W	1168252	Thorpe Hall More images
Methodist Chapel	Friskney, East Lindsey	Methodist Chapel	1839	2 December 1985	TF4718655762; 53°04′44″N 0°11′45″E	1267369	Methodist Chapel More images
Church of All Saints	Gautby, East Lindsey	Church	1754	14 September 1966	TF1747072439; 53°14′10″N 0°14′29″W	1359914	Church of All Saints More images
Church of St Helen	Biscathorpe, Gayton Le Wold, East Lindsey	Parish Church	1847	9 March 1967	TF2299284876; 53°20′47″N 0°09′14″W	1168152	Church of St Helen More images
Grimblethorpe Hall	Grimblethorpe, Gayton Le Wold, East Lindsey	Country House	c. 1620	9 March 1967	TF2374786484; 53°21′39″N 0°08′31″W	1063140	Grimblethorpe Hall More images
Church of St Nicholas	Grainsby, East Lindsey	Parish Church	12th century	9 September 1967	TF2781799479; 53°28′35″N 0°04′32″W	1063111	Church of St Nicholas More images
Baptist Chapel	Great Steeping, East Lindsey	Baptist Chapel	1701	17 December 1987	TF4500565364; 53°09′56″N 0°10′03″E	1223592	Baptist Chapel More images
Old Church of All Saints	Great Steeping, East Lindsey	Sundial	Mediaeval	17 December 1987	TF4347663943; 53°09′12″N 0°08′39″E	1267241	Old Church of All Saints More images
Total Submersion Font about 23m east of Chapel	Great Steeping, East Lindsey	Font	18th century	24 October 1986	TF4504265366; 53°09′56″N 0°10′05″E	1267243	Upload Photo
Church of All Saints	Great Sturton, East Lindsey	Parish Church	11th century	14 September 1966	TF2152976660; 53°16′23″N 0°10′45″W	1063098	Church of All Saints More images
Church of St Andrew	Ashby Puerorum, Greetham with Somersby, East Lindsey	Parish Church	13th century	14 September 1966	TF3280171412; 53°13′23″N 0°00′44″W	1147719	Church of St Andrew More images
Church of St Margaret	Bag Enderby, Greetham with Somersby, East Lindsey	Parish Church	15th century	14 September 1966	TF3492272049; 53°13′42″N 0°01′11″E	1147744	Church of St Margaret More images
Church of St Margaret	Somersby, Greetham with Somersby, East Lindsey	Parish Church	15th century	14 September 1966	TF3436472659; 53°14′02″N 0°00′42″E	1147772	Church of St Margaret More images
Somersby House	Greetham with Somersby, East Lindsey	House	1987	25 October 1951	TF3428672597; 53°14′00″N 0°00′38″E	1063648	Somersby House
Church of Holy Trinity	Hagworthingham, East Lindsey	Parish Church	11th century	14 September 1966	TF3438569228; 53°12′11″N 0°00′38″E	1063670	Church of Holy Trinity More images
Hagg New Hall	Hagworthingham, East Lindsey	House	Late 18th century	14 September 1966	TF3445969580; 53°12′23″N 0°00′42″E	1147296	Hagg New Hall More images
Church of St Andrew	Halton Holegate, East Lindsey	Parish Church	14th century	3 February 1967	TF4179465100; 53°09′51″N 0°07′10″E	1359727	Church of St Andrew More images
Church of St Mary	Harrington, East Lindsey	Parish Church	13th century	3 February 1967	TF3673171856; 53°13′34″N 0°02′48″E	1063676	Church of St Mary More images
Church of All Saints	Haugham, East Lindsey	Parish Church	1840	9 March 1967	TF3357081400; 53°18′46″N 0°00′12″E	1063691	Church of All Saints More images
Church of St Peter	Holton-le-Clay, East Lindsey	Parish Church	11th century	9 September 1967	TA2865102780; 53°30′22″N 0°03′42″W	1308396	Church of St Peter More images
Church of St Mary	Horncastle, East Lindsey	Parish Church	Early 13th century	7 December 1966	TF2585569555; 53°12′29″N 0°07′01″W	1168259	Church of St Mary More images
2 West Street	Horncastle, East Lindsey	House	Early 18th century	7 December 1966	TF2569069685; 53°12′34″N 0°07′10″W	1252030	Upload Photo
Church of All Saints	Irby in the Marsh, East Lindsey	Parish Church	Mid 13th century	3 February 1967	TF4684663758; 53°09′03″N 0°11′40″E	1223593	Church of All Saints More images
Church of St Margaret	Keddington, East Lindsey	Parish Church	Early 12th century	9 March 1967	TF3449288663; 53°22′40″N 0°01′13″E	1359987	Church of St Margaret More images
The Manor House	Little Cawthorpe, East Lindsey	House	C20	9 March 1967	TF3566883710; 53°19′58″N 0°02′09″E	1063697	The Manor House More images
Church of St Andrew	Little Steeping, East Lindsey	Parish Church	Mid 14th century	3 February 1967	TF4335863556; 53°08′59″N 0°08′32″E	1267204	Church of St Andrew More images
The Cottage	Little Steeping, East Lindsey	House	Mid 18th century	17 December 1987	TF4320763028; 53°08′43″N 0°08′23″E	1223594	Upload Photo
Cromwell's House	Louth, East Lindsey	Timber Framed House	Late Medieval	2 November 1954	TF3274487317; 53°21′58″N 0°00′23″W	1166184	Cromwell's House More images
Reading Room and Library	Louth, East Lindsey	Library	Late C18-Early 19th century	2 November 1954	TF3268187332; 53°21′58″N 0°00′27″W	1063212	Reading Room and Library More images
The Mansion	Louth, East Lindsey	House	c. 1600	2 November 1954	TF3232787208; 53°21′55″N 0°00′46″W	1359928	Upload Photo
The Sycamores	Louth, East Lindsey	House	Early 19th century	18 February 1974	TF3242487170; 53°21′53″N 0°00′41″W	1063180	Upload Photo
Thornton House	Louth, East Lindsey	House	Late 18th century	2 November 1954	TF3244887239; 53°21′56″N 0°00′40″W	1359929	Thornton House
Westgate House	Louth, East Lindsey	House	Late 18th century	2 November 1954	TF3252487275; 53°21′57″N 0°00′35″W	1063182	Westgate House
30–36 and 36b and 36c Bridge Street	Louth, East Lindsey	House	Early 19th century	2 November 1954	TF3261087469; 53°22′03″N 0°00′30″W	1063266	30–36 and 36b and 36c Bridge Street More images
19 Market Place	Louth, East Lindsey	Shop	Early 19th century	18 February 1974	TF3288487360; 53°21′59″N 0°00′16″W	1166096	19 Market Place
72–76 Westgate Place	Louth, East Lindsey	House	c. 1775	2 November 1954	TF3254387387; 53°22′00″N 0°00′34″W	1359894	Upload Photo
Church of St Peter	Low Toynton, East Lindsey	Parish Church	now redundant	14 September 1966	TF2753170494; 53°12′58″N 0°05′30″W	1262408	Church of St Peter More images
The Manor House	Ludborough, East Lindsey	House	16th century	6 June 1952	TF2952095466; 53°26′24″N 0°03′06″W	1063123	Upload Photo
Church of All Saints	Maltby le Marsh, East Lindsey	Parish Church	c. 1300	9 March 1957	TF4621281392; 53°18′33″N 0°11′35″E	1146990	Church of All Saints More images
Church of St Mary	Manby, East Lindsey	Church	14th century	9 March 1967	TF3992086646; 53°21′29″N 0°06′04″E	1063043	Church of St Mary More images
Church of St Helen	Mareham Le Fen, East Lindsey	Parish Church	Late 13th century	14 September 1966	TF2783361259; 53°07′59″N 0°05′27″W	1215809	Church of St Helen More images
Church of All Saints	Mareham on the Hill, East Lindsey	Parish Church	15th century	14 September 1966	TF2881567874; 53°11′32″N 0°04′24″W	1262409	Church of All Saints More images
Church of St Peter	Markby, East Lindsey	Parish Church	Mid 16th century	3 February 1967	TF4872478816; 53°17′08″N 0°13′46″E	1063009	Church of St Peter More images
Church of St Michael	Market Stainton, East Lindsey	Parish Church	13th century	14 September 1966	TF2279279923; 53°18′07″N 0°09′32″W	1359971	Church of St Michael More images
Church of St Michael	Mavis Enderby, East Lindsey	Parish Church	14th century	3 February 1967	TF3634766577; 53°10′44″N 0°02′19″E	1166344	Church of St Michael More images
Church of St. Andrew	Minting, East Lindsey	Church	c. 1200	14 September 1966	TF1871673453; 53°14′41″N 0°13′21″W	1146858	Church of St. Andrew More images
Church of St Nicholas	North Coates, East Lindsey	Parish Church	13th century	9 September 1967	TA3503000645; 53°29′07″N 0°02′01″E	1063126	Church of St Nicholas More images
Ivy Cottage	North Coates, East Lindsey	House	Early 18th century	30 January 1986	TA3489200465; 53°29′01″N 0°01′53″E	1307138	Upload Photo
Church of St Helen	North Thoresby, East Lindsey	Parish Church	13th century	9 September 1967	TF2900098768; 53°28′11″N 0°03′29″W	1359941	Church of St Helen More images
The Farmhouse	North Thoresby, East Lindsey	Farmhouse	1683	30 January 1986	TF2907298528; 53°28′04″N 0°03′25″W	1063127	Upload Photo
Church of All Saints	Orby, East Lindsey	Parish Church	13th century	3 February 1967	TF4906467248; 53°10′53″N 0°13′45″E	1280972	Church of All Saints More images
Church of St Nicholas	Partney, East Lindsey	Parish Church	14th century	3 February 1967	TF4104268367; 53°11′37″N 0°06′35″E	1063679	Church of St Nicholas More images
Church of Holy Trinity	Raithby, East Lindsey	Parish Church	12th century	3 February 1967	TF3737967065; 53°10′59″N 0°03′16″E	1063584	Church of Holy Trinity More images
Church of St. Edith	Reston, East Lindsey	Parish Church	11th century	9 March 1967	TF3828483728; 53°19′57″N 0°04′30″E	1308718	Church of St. Edith More images
Church of St. Margaret	Roughton, East Lindsey	Church	13th century	6 September 1985	TF2415164697; 53°09′54″N 0°08′40″W	1308751	Church of St. Margaret More images
Church of St. Michael	Martin, Roughton, East Lindsey	Church	12th century	14 September 1966	TF2394166836; 53°11′03″N 0°08′48″W	1146950	Church of St. Michael More images
Roughton Hall	Roughton, East Lindsey	House	Mid 18th century	25 October 1951	TF2407564910; 53°10′01″N 0°08′44″W	1308748	Upload Photo
Church of St Peter	Saltfleetby, East Lindsey	Parish Church	1877	9 March 1967	TF4310489268; 53°22′51″N 0°09′00″E	1063060	Church of St Peter More images
The Old Hall	Sausthorpe, East Lindsey	House	Late 15th century	3 February 1967	TF3830569119; 53°12′04″N 0°04′09″E	1063639	The Old Hall More images
Church of St Benedict	Scrivelsby, East Lindsey	Parish Church	Early 13th century	14 September 1966	TF2655265774; 53°10′27″N 0°06′29″W	1252195	Church of St Benedict More images
The Lion Gateway	Scrivelsby, East Lindsey	Gate	C20	25 March 1987	TF2678966070; 53°10′36″N 0°06′16″W	1262404	The Lion Gateway More images
Church of St Clement	Skegness, East Lindsey	Church	Mid 16th century	20 April 1976	TF5586863900; 53°08′58″N 0°19′45″E	1229943	Church of St Clement More images
Church of St Peter	Sotby, East Lindsey	Parish Church	Early 12th century	14 September 1966	TF2043378867; 53°17′35″N 0°11′41″W	1063066	Church of St Peter More images
South Ormsby Hall	South Ormsby cum Ketsby, East Lindsey	Country House	17th century	3 February 1967	TF3673275520; 53°15′33″N 0°02′54″E	1168647	South Ormsby Hall More images
Church of St Andrew	South Thoresby, East Lindsey	Parish Church	1738	9 March 1967	TF4013977070; 53°16′20″N 0°06′00″E	1063600	Church of St Andrew More images
Church of St Martin	South Willingham, East Lindsey	Parish Church	Late 13th century	9 March 1967	TF1950083331; 53°20′00″N 0°12′25″W	1359955	Church of St Martin More images
Church of St Andrew	Stewton, East Lindsey	Parish Church	11th century	9 March 1967	TF3620887151; 53°21′49″N 0°02′44″E	1359976	Church of St Andrew More images
Church of St Helen	Stickford, East Lindsey	Parish Church	13th century	3 February 1967	TF3519260038; 53°07′13″N 0°01′07″E	1063536	Church of St Helen More images
Church of St Luke	Stickney, East Lindsey	Parish Church	13th century	3 February 1967	TF3434457073; 53°05′38″N 0°00′17″E	1063538	Church of St Luke More images
Barn at Halstead Hall Farm	Halstead, Stixwould and Woodhall, East Lindsey	Barn	19th century	6 September 1985	TF1874366297; 53°10′50″N 0°13′29″W	1063161	Upload Photo
Church of St. Oswald	Strubby with Woodthorpe, East Lindsey	Parish Church	c. 1300	9 March 1967	TF4527482576; 53°19′13″N 0°10′46″E	1062988	Church of St. Oswald More images
Church of St Vedest	Tathwell, East Lindsey	Parish Church	Early 12th century	9 March 1967	TF3205182924; 53°19′36″N 0°01′07″W	1359666	Church of St Vedest More images
The Old College (behind Number 3 Market Place)	Tattershall, East Lindsey	Brewery	Earlier than C20	14 September 1966	TF2129757847; 53°06′15″N 0°11′23″W	1287800	The Old College (behind Number 3 Market Place) More images
Church of St Mary	Tetford, East Lindsey	Parish Church	Early 12th century	14 September 1966	TF3339774804; 53°15′13″N 0°00′07″W	1205243	Church of St Mary More images
Church of St Helen	Theddlethorpe St. Helen, East Lindsey	Parish Church	14th century	9 March 1967	TF4758588815; 53°22′32″N 0°13′01″E	1147259	Church of St Helen More images
White Cottage	Thimbleby, East Lindsey	House	Late 16th century	6 September 1985	TF2396670027; 53°12′46″N 0°08′42″W	1308652	White Cottage More images
Church of St Andrew	Utterby, East Lindsey	Parish Church	14th century	9 September 1967	TF3059593246; 53°25′11″N 0°02′11″W	1063086	Church of St Andrew More images
Packhorse Bridge	Utterby, East Lindsey	Packhorse Bridge	14th century	30 January 1986	TF3055793197; 53°25′10″N 0°02′13″W	1168183	Packhorse Bridge More images
Cross	Wainfleet All Saints, East Lindsey	Market Cross	15th century	3 February 1967	TF4983458958; 53°06′24″N 0°14′13″E	1223766	Cross More images
Church of St Mary	Wainfleet St Mary, East Lindsey	Parish Church	Late 12th century	3 February 1967	TF4711158672; 53°06′18″N 0°11′46″E	1224403	Church of St Mary More images
Well Vale House	Well Vale Park, Well, East Lindsey	Country House	Early 17th century	3 February 1967	TF4468073550; 53°14′21″N 0°09′59″E	1168883	Well Vale House More images
Church of St Martin	Welton Le Marsh, East Lindsey	Parish Church	Medieval	3 February 1967	TF4704768808; 53°11′46″N 0°11′59″E	1063626	Church of St Martin More images
Church of St Martin	Welton Le Wold, East Lindsey	Parish Church	14th century	9 March 1967	TF2734787307; 53°22′02″N 0°05′15″W	1307089	Church of St Martin More images
West Ashby House	West Ashby, East Lindsey	House	1966	14 September 1966	TF2654972446; 53°14′02″N 0°06′20″W	1252245	West Ashby House
Church of St Helen	West Keal, East Lindsey	Parish Church	13th century	3 February 1967	TF3674963754; 53°09′12″N 0°02′37″E	1146806	Church of St Helen More images
Font in Churchyard at West End of Church of St Mary	Withern with Stain, East Lindsey	Font	C20	9 July 1986	TF4248082188; 53°19′03″N 0°08′15″E	1062995	Upload Photo
The Tower on the Moor	Woodhall Spa, East Lindsey	Tower	15th century	6 September 1985	TF2109363981; 53°09′33″N 0°11′25″W	1359921	The Tower on the Moor More images
Cadeby Hall	Cadeby, Wyham cum Cadeby, East Lindsey	Country House	Early 18th century	24 February 1986	TF2703395936; 53°26′42″N 0°05′20″W	1307067	Cadeby Hall More images
