= Grade II* listed buildings in Havant (borough) =

There are over 20,000 Grade II* listed buildings in England. This page is a list of these buildings in the district of Havant in Hampshire.

== Havant ==
Name	Location	Type	Completed (Note: The date given is the date used by Historic England as significant for the initial building or that of an important part in the structure's description.)	Date designated	Grid ref. (Note: Sometimes known as OSGB36, the grid reference is based on the British national grid reference system used by the Ordnance Survey.) Geo-coordinates	Entry number (Note: The "List Entry Number" is a unique number assigned to each listed building and scheduled monument by Historic England.)	Image
Church of St Faith	Havant	Parish Church	12th century	16 May 1952	SU7176406238; 50°51′04″N 0°58′55″W	1092120	Church of St Faith More images
Church of St Mary	Hayling Island, Havant	Parish Church	13th century	16 May 1952	SU7220100045; 50°47′44″N 0°58′37″W	1091616	Church of St Mary More images
Fort Purbrook	Havant	Barracks	1860s	26 May 1976	SU6782906548; 50°51′16″N 1°02′16″W	1092134	Fort Purbrook More images
The Staunton Memorial	Leigh Park, Havant	Pavilion	1828	6 February 1984	SU7204508981; 50°52′33″N 0°58′39″W	1303476	The Staunton Memorial More images
Warblington Castle	Warblington, Havant	Courtyard House	1514-1526	16 May 1952	SU7289505550; 50°50′42″N 0°57′58″W	1154484	Warblington Castle More images
