= Grade II* listed buildings in New Forest (district) =

There are over 20,000 Grade II* listed buildings in England. This page is a list of these buildings in the district of New Forest in Hampshire.

== New Forest ==
Name	Location	Type	Completed (Note: The date given is the date used by Historic England as significant for the initial building or that of an important part in the structure's description.)	Date designated	Grid ref. (Note: The grid reference is based on the British national grid reference system, sometimes known as OSGB36, used by the Ordnance Survey.) Geo-coordinates	Entry number (Note: The "List Entry Number" is a unique number assigned to each listed building and scheduled monument by Historic England.)	Image
Abbey Mill	Beaulieu, New Forest	Mill	In use until 1940	8 October 1959	SU3876102294; 50°49′08″N 1°27′04″W	1156800	Abbey Mill
Barn and attached Farm Range 60m south-east of Beufre Farmhouse	Beufre, Beaulieu, New Forest	Cistercian Monastery	possibly monastic construction	10 June 1987	SU3860901127; 50°48′30″N 1°27′12″W	1156695	Barn and attached Farm Range 60m south-east of Beufre Farmhouse
Length of North of Abbey Precinct Wall 180m north of Shireburn House	Beaulieu Manor Estate, Beaulieu, New Forest	Abbey	Late 13th century	8 October 1959	SU3897702871; 50°49′27″N 1°26′53″W	1351195	Upload Photo
Length of South Abbey Precinct Wall, East of Entrance to Palace House	Beaulieu, New Forest	Abbey	Late 13th century	8 October 1959	SU3889202436; 50°49′13″N 1°26′57″W	1094412	Upload Photo
Length of West Wall of Abbey Precinct, 100 Metres North West of Motor Museum	Beaulieu Manor Estate, Beaulieu, New Forest	Abbey	Late 13th century	8 October 1959	SU3851502666; 50°49′20″N 1°27′17″W	1094423	Upload Photo
Monks Well	Hilltop, Beaulieu, New Forest	Abbey	Late 13th century	10 June 1987	SU3972903072; 50°49′33″N 1°26′14″W	1094408	Upload Photo
Outer Gatehouse Ruins and Length of Precinct Wall Running East to Abbey Gate Cottages	Beaulieu Manor Estate, Beaulieu, New Forest	Abbey	Late 13th century	8 October 1959	SU3876802367; 50°49′10″N 1°27′04″W	1156673	Outer Gatehouse Ruins and Length of Precinct Wall Running East to Abbey Gate Cottages More images
Walls to Courtyard and Bridge on South Side of Palace House	Beaulieu Manor Estate, Beaulieu, New Forest	Moat	Early 18th century	10 June 1987	SU3874102417; 50°49′12″N 1°27′05″W	1302762	Upload Photo
Winepress	Beaulieu Manor Estate, Beaulieu, New Forest	Abbey	Late 13th century	8 October 1959	SU3877902736; 50°49′22″N 1°27′03″W	1351196	Upload Photo
Boldre Grange	Battramsley, Boldre, New Forest	Country House	1872-4	13 May 1987	SZ3137398880; 50°47′19″N 1°33′23″W	1351025	Upload Photo
Burard-Neale Monument	Walhampton, Boldre, New Forest	Obelisk	1840	8 April 1976	SZ3324695881; 50°45′42″N 1°31′48″W	1351049	Burard-Neale Monument More images
Church of St John	Boldre, New Forest	Parish Church	Norman	8 October 1959	SZ3236499307; 50°47′33″N 1°32′32″W	1094785	Church of St John More images
Newtown Park	South Baddesley, Boldre, New Forest	Country House	18th century	8 October 1959	SZ3437996954; 50°46′16″N 1°30′50″W	1301405	Upload Photo
Pylewell House	Pylewell Park, Boldre, New Forest	Country House	Mid 19th century	13 May 1987	SZ3536095831; 50°45′40″N 1°30′00″W	1351015	Pylewell House More images
Walhampton House now Walhampton School	Walhampton, Boldre, New Forest	Country House/School	Early 18th century	13 May 1987	SZ3316396674; 50°46′07″N 1°31′52″W	1157615	Walhampton House now Walhampton School More images
Church of St Peter	Bramshaw, New Forest	Parish Church	Mid 13th century	8 October 1959	SU2647916647; 50°56′55″N 1°37′28″W	1301290	Church of St Peter More images
Warrens House	Warrens Park, Bramshaw, New Forest	Country House	c. 1800	8 October 1959	SU2749515072; 50°56′04″N 1°36′36″W	1094773	Upload Photo
Barn 30m south of Home Farm Cottages	Breamore Park, Breamore, New Forest	Threshing Barn	Late 16th century	14 April 1986	SU1494418776; 50°58′06″N 1°47′19″W	1350956	Upload Photo
Breamore House	Breamore Park, Breamore, New Forest	Country House	1583	25 February 1958	SU1527019029; 50°58′14″N 1°47′02″W	1094935	Breamore House More images
Dairy Cottages	Charford, Breamore, New Forest	House	18th century	23 August 1979	SU1687418931; 50°58′10″N 1°45′40″W	1350918	Upload Photo
North Charford Manor House	Charford, Breamore, New Forest	House	16th century	30 September 1964	SU1706719482; 50°58′28″N 1°45′30″W	1302005	Upload Photo
Church of St Nicholas	Brockenhurst, New Forest	Parish Church	12th century	13 May 1987	SU3052501766; 50°48′53″N 1°34′05″W	1094740	Church of St Nicholas More images
Rhinefield House Hotel	Rhinefield, Brockenhurst, New Forest	Country House	1888-90	28 July 1986	SU2645203629; 50°49′54″N 1°37′33″W	1094743	Rhinefield House Hotel More images
Court Farm House	Damerham, New Forest	House	14th century	30 September 1964	SU1099016029; 50°56′37″N 1°50′42″W	1350950	Court Farm House
Moyles Court House now Moyles Court School	Rockford, Ellingham, Harbridge and Ibsley, New Forest	Country House/School	Late 17th century	30 September 1964	SU1619208513; 50°52′33″N 1°46′16″W	1095007	Moyles Court House now Moyles Court School More images
Somerley House	Somerley Park Estate, Ellingham, Harbridge and Ibsley, New Forest	Country House	1792-1795	30 September 1964	SU1342207883; 50°52′13″N 1°48′38″W	1350879	Somerley House More images
Exbury House	Exbury Estate, Exbury and Lepe, New Forest	Country House	18th century	8 October 1959	SU4238100054; 50°47′55″N 1°24′00″W	1094360	Exbury House More images
Calshot Castle	Calshot, Fawley, New Forest	Castle	1538-1541	10 June 1987	SU4887702487; 50°49′12″N 1°18′27″W	1302351	Calshot Castle More images
Luttrell's Tower	Eaglehurst, Fawley, New Forest	Tower	c. 1780	8 October 1959	SU4769000930; 50°48′21″N 1°19′28″W	1094367	Luttrell's Tower More images
Main Hangar (Calshot former RNAS Station, immediately south of Castle)	Calshot, Fawley, New Forest	Seaplane Shed (type F)	First World War	8 April 1988	SU4887702333; 50°49′07″N 1°18′27″W	1095046	Main Hangar (Calshot former RNAS Station, immediately south of Castle)
Type G Hangar (Calshot former RNAS Station approx 130m south-west of Castle)	Calshot, Fawley, New Forest	Sports Building	1994	7 January 1994	SU4880602435; 50°49′10″N 1°18′31″W	1251278	Type G Hangar (Calshot former RNAS Station approx 130m south-west of Castle)
Watersports Hangar (Calshot former RNAS Station circa 250m west of Castle)	Calshot, Fawley, New Forest	Sports Building	1994	8 April 1988	SU4872202427; 50°49′10″N 1°18′35″W	1095045	Watersports Hangar (Calshot former RNAS Station circa 250m west of Castle)
Bickton Manor Farmhouse	Bickton, Fordingbridge, New Forest	Farmhouse	Late 15th century	30 September 1964	SU1484312476; 50°54′42″N 1°47′25″W	1350971	Upload Photo
Fryern Court	Upper Burgate, Fordingbridge, New Forest	House	Early 16th century	30 September 1964	SU1427516174; 50°56′41″N 1°47′53″W	1166571	Fryern Court
Road Bridge over River Avon	Fordingbridge, New Forest	Road Bridge	14th century or 15th century	30 September 1964	SU1493714215; 50°55′38″N 1°47′20″W	1301381	Road Bridge over River Avon More images
The Old Manor House	Fordingbridge, New Forest	House	Late 17th century	30 September 1964	SU1496514387; 50°55′43″N 1°47′18″W	1167019	The Old Manor House More images
Efford House	Everton, Hordle, New Forest	House	circa 1820 or before	22 December 1953	SZ2993694434; 50°44′55″N 1°34′37″W	1275023	Upload Photo
Venards House	North Gorley, Hyde, New Forest	House	Late 17th century	30 September 1964	SU1611410932; 50°53′52″N 1°46′20″W	1350990	Upload Photo
Bellevue House and adjoining Former Stables	Lymington and Pennington, New Forest	House	18th century	22 December 1953	SZ3235595475; 50°45′29″N 1°32′34″W	1275490	Upload Photo
Boundary Wall and Gate at Quadrille Court	Lymington and Pennington, New Forest	Gate	18th century	28 October 1974	SZ3213195401; 50°45′26″N 1°32′45″W	1222298	Upload Photo
Garden Wall to Elm Grove House	Lymington and Pennington, New Forest	Garden Wall	18th century	28 October 1974	SZ3229195229; 50°45′21″N 1°32′37″W	1234599	Garden Wall to Elm Grove House More images
Ivy House, No 63 High St and Area Railings of Twynham House	Lymington and Pennington, New Forest	House	18th century	22 December 1953	SZ3221095455; 50°45′28″N 1°32′41″W	1217678	Ivy House, No 63 High St and Area Railings of Twynham House More images
Monmouth House (including the Former Office of the Clerk to the Justices)	Lymington and Pennington, New Forest	House	Older	22 December 1953	SZ3215495394; 50°45′26″N 1°32′44″W	1222296	Monmouth House (including the Former Office of the Clerk to the Justices) More images
Gate with Overthrow at Monmouth House	Lymington and Pennington, New Forest	Gate	18th century	28 October 1974	SZ3214995405; 50°45′26″N 1°32′44″W	1274709	Upload Photo
Parish Church of St Thomas the Apostle	Lymington and Pennington, New Forest	Parish Church	13th century	22 December 1953	SZ3218195442; 50°45′28″N 1°32′42″W	1217370	Parish Church of St Thomas the Apostle More images
Quadrille Court Nos 1, 2 and 3	Lymington and Pennington, New Forest	House	Late 17th century	22 December 1953	SZ3211895375; 50°45′26″N 1°32′46″W	1274710	Upload Photo
Southend House	Lymington and Pennington, New Forest	House	Early 18th century	22 December 1953	SZ3220395360; 50°45′25″N 1°32′41″W	1234367	Upload Photo
40 and 42, High Street	Lymington and Pennington, New Forest	House	Early 19th century	28 October 1974	SZ3242095499; 50°45′29″N 1°32′30″W	1275485	Upload Photo
60, High Street	Lymington and Pennington, New Forest	House	late C18/early 19th century	22 December 1953	SZ3219295407; 50°45′27″N 1°32′42″W	1275436	60, High Street
Foxlease	Clay Hill, Lyndhurst, New Forest	Country House	Late 18th century	8 October 1959	SU2991907070; 50°51′45″N 1°34′35″W	1167113	Foxlease More images
High Coxlease	Clay Hill, Lyndhurst, New Forest	Country House	1898	13 May 1987	SU2993906672; 50°51′32″N 1°34′34″W	1167115	Upload Photo
The Queen's House	Lyndhurst, New Forest	Hunting Lodge	Medieval	8 April 1976	SU2972808135; 50°52′19″N 1°34′44″W	1167237	The Queen's House More images
Marchwood House	Marchwood Park, Marchwood, New Forest	Country House	1820	10 June 1987	SU3911209220; 50°52′52″N 1°26′43″W	1094335	Upload Photo
Manor House and attached Wall	Martin, New Forest	Farmhouse	Early 17th century	30 September 1964	SU0675319759; 50°58′38″N 1°54′19″W	1167353	Manor House and attached Wall More images
Bridge House including Railings in Front	Ringwood, New Forest	House	Mid 18th century	30 September 1964	SU1444305235; 50°50′47″N 1°47′46″W	1350899	Upload Photo
Church of St Peter and St Paul	Ringwood, New Forest	Meeting Hall	C20	30 September 1964	SU1452205360; 50°50′51″N 1°47′42″W	1094964	Church of St Peter and St Paul More images
Manor House	Ringwood, New Forest	Manor House	Early C18, earlier core	30 September 1964	SU1489405490; 50°50′55″N 1°47′23″W	1178471	Manor House More images
Meeting House	Ringwood, New Forest	Nonconformist Meeting House	1727	30 September 1964	SU1473305277; 50°50′49″N 1°47′32″W	1094968	Meeting House More images
Eyre Coote Monument	West Park Estate, Rockbourne, New Forest	Monument	1827	30 September 1964	SU1171516339; 50°56′47″N 1°50′05″W	1167928	Eyre Coote Monument
Church of St Michael and All Angels	Sopley, New Forest	Parish Church	13th century or earlier origins	30 September 1964	SZ1564696715; 50°46′11″N 1°46′46″W	1302276	Church of St Michael and All Angels More images
Peterson's Tower	Sway, New Forest	Tower	1879-1885	11 April 1975	SZ2798796740; 50°46′10″N 1°36′16″W	1296880	Peterson's Tower More images
Church of St Mary	Eling Hill, Totton and Eling, New Forest	Parish Church	Saxon	8 October 1959	SU3669212459; 50°54′38″N 1°28′46″W	1094344	Church of St Mary More images
Redbridge Bridge	Totton and Eling, New Forest	Road Bridge	17th century	8 October 1959	SU3699513713; 50°55′18″N 1°28′30″W	1351230	Redbridge Bridge More images
Redbridge Bridge	Redbridge, Totton and Eling, New Forest	Road Bridge	17th century	8 October 1981	SU3699513713; 50°55′18″N 1°28′30″W	1091972	Redbridge Bridge More images
The Old Rectory	Eling Hill, Totton and Eling, New Forest	Apartment	C20	10 June 1987	SU3674712332; 50°54′33″N 1°28′43″W	1094348	The Old Rectory
Tide Mill	Eling Causeway, Totton and Eling, New Forest	Dam	Mid 18th century	29 March 1959	SU3650212520; 50°54′40″N 1°28′56″W	1179062	Tide Mill More images
