= Alford Manor House =

Manor house and museum in Lincolnshire, England

Coordinates: 53.261259°N 0.178386°E

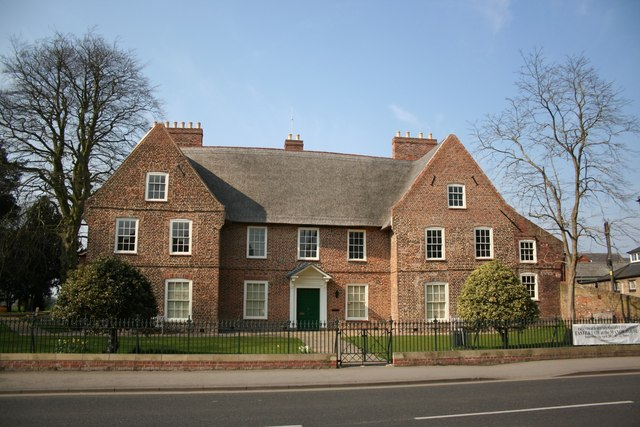
Alford Manor House.

The Manor House is a Grade II* listed building which can be found on West street within Alford, Lincolnshire, England. It is believed to be the largest thatched manor house in England and was built to a traditional H plan in 1611. It is a very rare example of a composite structure, featuring a wooden frame with reed and plaster (visible from within the house), encased in brick. Ground-floor and first-floor rooms feature design interventions from Georgian through to Victorian times, while the attic floor is virtually untouched since 1611.

The house was possibly built by a John Hopkinson The house owes much of its existence to the wealth of one of its owners, Sir Robert Christopher. Christopher fought for the Royalist cause in the civil war and was knighted by Charles II following the restoration. The house was inherited by his granddaughter, Lucy, who married John Manners, Duke of Rutland. Thereafter Alford Manor House was inhabited by tenants, one of whom was John Higgins, who arrived in about 1820. He was a friend of Charles Darwin's father, Robert, and was the local Land Agent. He established his office in the nineteenth century annex which you can see on the east wing of the house.

It was his descendant, Dorothy Higgins, a doctor and member of Alford Town Council, who bought the property in 1958 and gave it to the town in 1967. Alford Civic Trust was established then to manage and look after the property.

The house itself is unusual in its construction: most properties of the period were built using a wooden frame with wattle and daub infill, or with a brick infill, so that the wooden beams would be visible from the outside as well as from inside the property. However, Alford Manor House was encased in brick, and the brick was not merely ornamental: it was tied into the structure of the building via wall plates and floor joists.

The house was renovated and re-thatched during the period 2004–2006.

The house is owned by Alford and District Civic Trust Ltd which is a Registered Charity (No. 252330).
