= St Mary's Church, Hayling Island =

Church in Portsmouth, England

Coordinates: 50.795°N 0.976°W

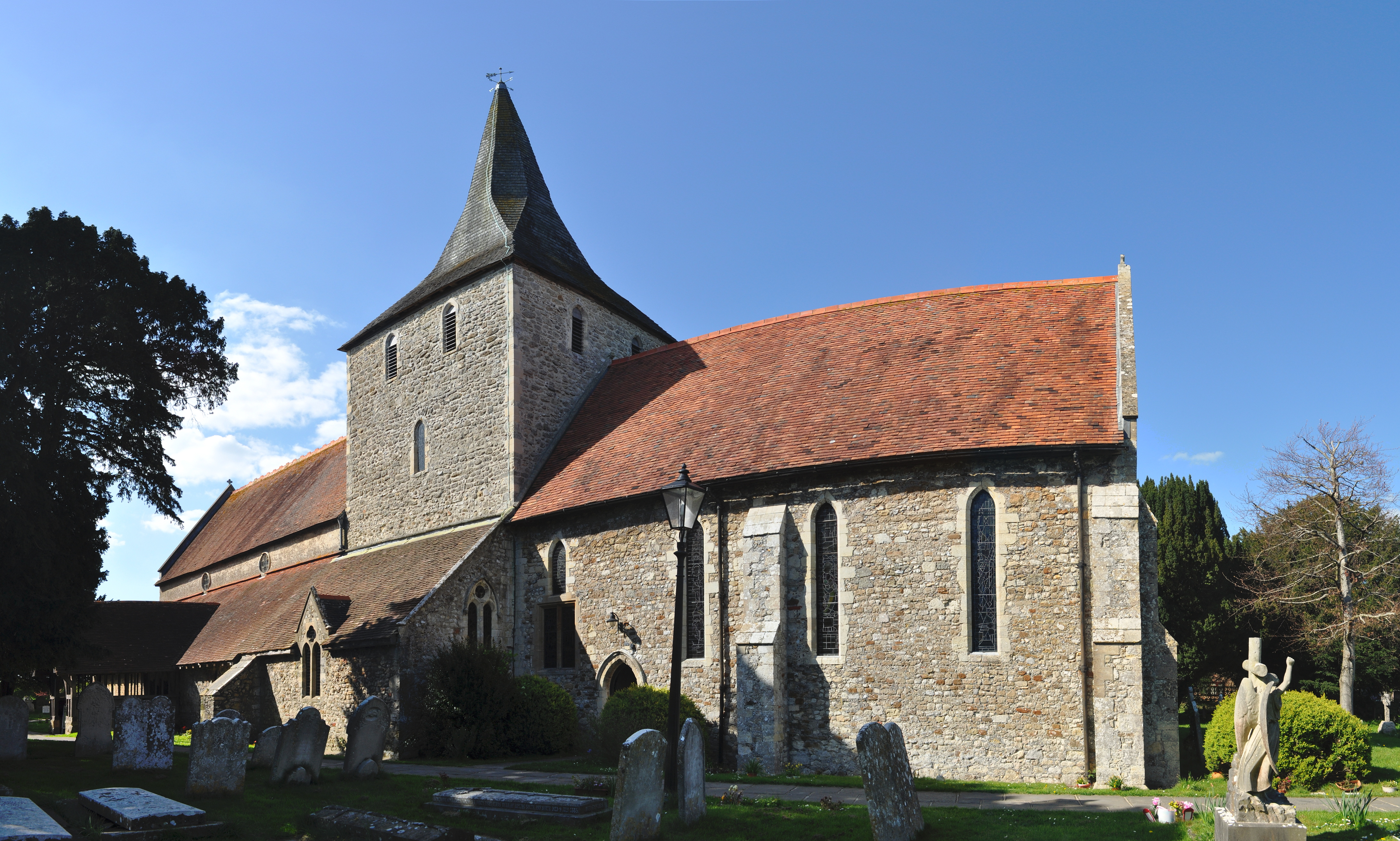
- St Mary's Church, Hayling Island
- Denomination: Church of England
- Website: https://www.haylinganglicans.co.uk/st-marys-church/

History
- Dedication: St Mary

Administration
- Diocese: Portsmouth
- Parish: Hayling Island

Clergy
- Vicar: Nick Todd

St Mary's Church is a parish church in the Church of England in the Anglican Diocese of Portsmouth within the Havant deanery in Hampshire.

== History ==
Built mainly in the early thirteenth century from imported stone, the church gained the addition on a timber porch in the fifteenth century and received significant interior restoration and alteration during the mid-late 19th Century. St Mary's Church became the central church on Hayling after flooding claimed the priory church, along with much of the southern edge of the Island in the 13th or 14th century.

Although the original stocks and whipping post that were housed in the church yard have now been removed to Havant Museum, St Mary's still has many features worthy of note. The most noticeable of these is the ancient yew that dominates the church yard, believed to be one of the oldest in the country with a girth of some nine metres. Although estimates as to its age vary, they range from over a thousand to nearly two thousand years old.

Four sun dials are carved into the outside walls of the church. Used for timing the frequent church services in the days before mechanical timepieces, these now receive too much shade from the surrounding yew trees to be of any functional use.

In 1803 the three bells in the belfry, once impressed “1324” were replaced by a tolling bell.

Inside the church notable features include a stained glass window depicting the Tree of Jesse created by Herbert Bryans. The church has two interesting fonts. The first font, a Saxon stone basin with interlacing patterns, was excavated from a site near the vicarage in the nineteenth century. The second is a Norman font of a much squarer, less intricate design.

In 2010 the church was re-ordered. Victorian pews were removed and replaced with chairs, giving the church a much lighter and more flexible character. Repairs were made to the base of pillars damaged when the pews were put in, and other alterations were made. At the foot of one of the restored pillars the masons carved the head of an elephant. The pipe organ - which had been damaged a few years previously by vandalism - was replaced with a digital organ.

In December 2018, Field Service Engineer, YouTuber and World Traveler, Michael Gatten visited the church to witness the west window which was dedicated to his great-grandfather, Commodore Lord Robert Thomas Brudenell-Bruce.

== Interior ==
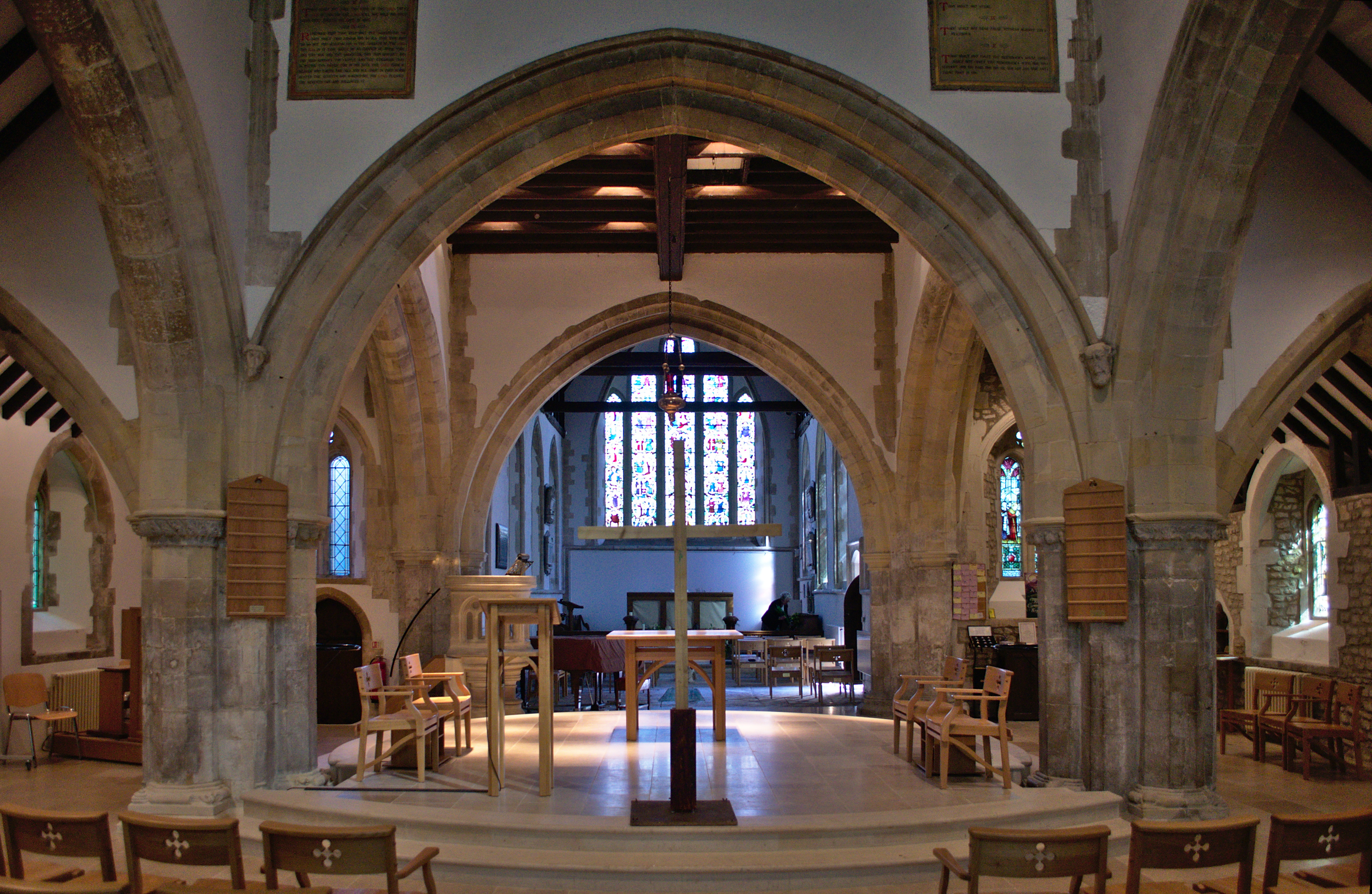
Interior

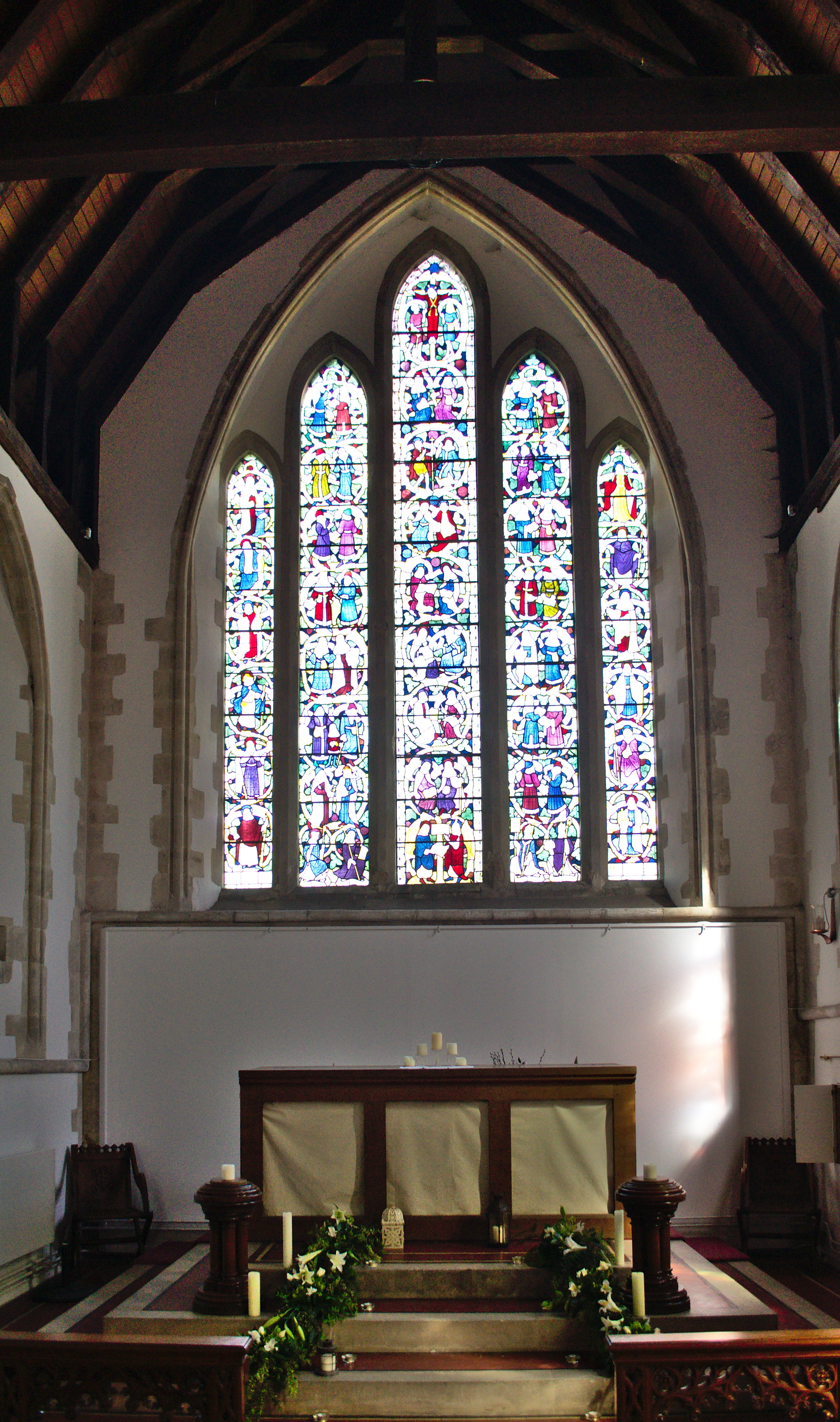
West Window dedicated to Lord Robert Thomas Brudenell-Bruce
