= Luttrell's Tower =

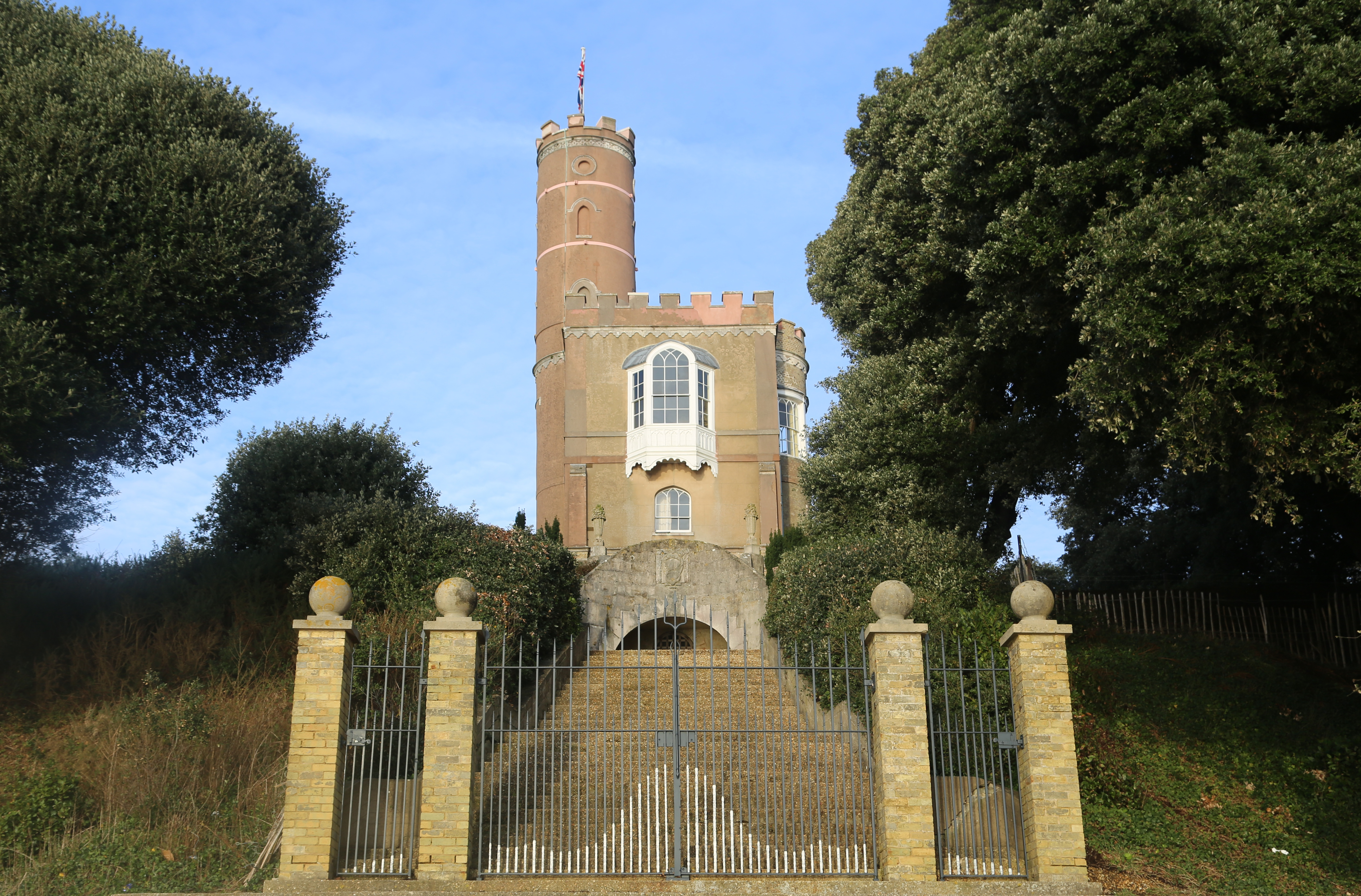
- Luttrell's Tower from the beach

- Location within Hampshire
- 50°48′22″N 1°19′29″W
- Type: Folly
- Location: Fawley
- OS grid reference: SU 47690 00930

History
- Built: 1780

Site notes
- Area: Hampshire
- Architect: Thomas Sandby
- Owner: Landmark Trust

Listed Building – Grade II*
- Official name: Luttrell's Tower
- Designated: 8 October 1959
- Reference no.: 1094367

Listed Building – Grade II
- Official name: 3 flights of steps and gateway south east of Luttrell's Tower
- Designated: 10 Jun 1987
- Reference no.: 1178697

Luttrell's Tower is a three-storey stuccoed yellow brick folly south of Southampton, Hampshire, England, near the village of Calshot. It has a six-storey circular stair turret extending above the rest. It stands on the shore of the Solent, close to the grounds of Eaglehurst House. It is owned by the Landmark Trust.

== History ==
The tower was built circa 1780 for Temple Simon Luttrell by Thomas Sandby, who was a founder member and first Professor of Architecture at the Royal Academy. Temple Luttrell was a Member of Parliament who was allegedly involved in smuggling on the south coast (though no firm evidence of this exists). The tower's lookout, extending above the height of the main building, would have afforded a commanding view of the activities of the customs men in the area, both out to sea and inland. A tunnel running from an entrance just above the beach straight into the cellar of the tower would have made transferring contraband from the Isle of Wight a low risk operation. It is possible that the tunnel predates the tower. Once the goods were on the mainland, the proximity of Southampton would have made distribution expeditious. In the early 19th century the tower was sold to Richard Lambart, 7th Earl of Cavan. The earl set up tents around the base of the tower and lived in it for a while. Finding the tower too small he later built Eaglehurst House slightly further inland. Documentation in the tower suggests there may have been tunnels from the base of the tower into the cellars of Eaglehurst House; if so they are now blocked up.

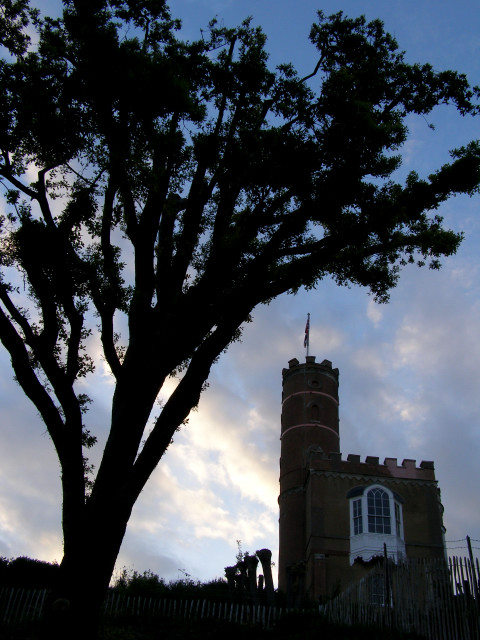
Luttrell's Tower from the south side, May 2006.

Marconi used the tower for his wireless experiments of 1912. He rented Eaglehurst House and the tower between 1911 and 1916, and used the top of the tower for his transmissions. His youngest daughter, Gioia, was christened at Fawley Church in 1916. Steps down to the beach were added in 1927 to a design by Clough Williams-Ellis.

During World War 2 the tower was taken over by the military who fitted steel shutters over the windows. After the war the tower along with the house was purchased by Valder Gates who had the wartime damage the buildings had suffered repaired.

== Modern use ==
The tower became a Grade: II* Listed building on 8 October 1959. Since 1968 it has been owned by the Landmark Trust, a charity that rescues and restores historical buildings. It is now let as a holiday home.
