= Grade II* listed buildings in Eastleigh (borough) =

There are over 20,000 Grade II* listed buildings in England. This page is a list of these buildings in the district of Eastleigh in Hampshire.

== Eastleigh ==
Name	Location	Type	Completed (Note: The date given is the date used by Historic England as significant for the initial building or that of an important part in the structure's description.)	Date designated	Grid ref. (Note: Sometimes known as OSGB36, the grid reference is based on the British national grid reference system used by the Ordnance Survey.) Geo-coordinates	Entry number (Note: The "List Entry Number" is a unique number assigned to each listed building and scheduled monument by Historic England.)	Image
(old) Church of St Bartholomew	Botley, Eastleigh	Church	13th century	5 December 1955	SU5104511954; 50°54′17″N 1°16′32″W	1322638	(old) Church of St Bartholomew More images
Bursledon Windmill	Bursledon, Eastleigh	Post Mill	1741	14 February 1983	SU4827010829; 50°53′42″N 1°18′54″W	1281479	Bursledon Windmill More images
Church of St Leonard	Bursledon, Eastleigh	Church	13th century	5 December 1955	SU4886109717; 50°53′06″N 1°18′24″W	1111964	Church of St Leonard More images
Church of St Andrew	Hamble-le-Rice, Eastleigh	Church	12th century	5 December 1955	SU4810106737; 50°51′29″N 1°19′05″W	1111917	Church of St Andrew More images
Sydney Lodge including stable	Hamble-le-Rice, Eastleigh	House	1789-1798	5 December 1955	SU4705107250; 50°51′46″N 1°19′58″W	1111924	Upload Photo
Chapel in the Grounds of the Royal Victoria Hospital	Royal Victoria Hospital, Hound, Eastleigh	Chapel	1856-63	9 April 1974	SU4643407664; 50°52′00″N 1°20′30″W	1322694	Chapel in the Grounds of the Royal Victoria Hospital More images
Church of St Mary	Hound, Eastleigh	Church	13th century	5 December 1955	SU4708308735; 50°52′34″N 1°19′56″W	1322693	Church of St Mary More images
Netley Castle	Hound, Eastleigh	Castle	1840-1860	21 October 1974	SU4511308862; 50°52′39″N 1°21′37″W	1336957	Netley Castle More images
Church of St Nicholas	North Stoneham, Eastleigh	Church	Medieval	14 August 1953	SU4405617308; 50°57′13″N 1°22′27″W	1204006	Church of St Nicholas More images
