= Grade II* listed buildings in North East Lincolnshire =

There are over 20,000 Grade II* listed buildings in England. This page is a list of these buildings in the district of North East Lincolnshire in Lincolnshire.

== North East Lincolnshire ==
Name	Location	Type	Completed (Note: The date given is the date used by Historic England as significant for the initial building or that of an important part in the structure's description.)	Date designated	Grid ref. (Note: The grid reference is based on the British national grid reference system, sometimes known as OSGB36, used by the Ordnance Survey.) Geo-coordinates	Entry number (Note: The "List Entry Number" is a unique number assigned to each listed building and scheduled monument by Historic England.)	Image
Church of St Peter	Ashby cum Fenby, North East Lincolnshire	Parish Church	12th century	4 January 1967	TA2545400949; 53°29′25″N 0°06′38″W	1346925	Church of St Peter More images
Church of Saint George	Bradley, North East Lincolnshire	Parish Church	13th century	4 January 1967	TA2417106765; 53°32′34″N 0°07′39″W	1346948	Church of Saint George More images
Church of St Helen	Brigsley, North East Lincolnshire	Parish Church	11th century	4 January 1967	TA2546701813; 53°29′53″N 0°06′36″W	1103490	Church of St Helen More images
Church of Saint Margaret	Hawerby cum Beesby, North East Lincolnshire	Church	C12-C13	4 January 1967	TF2608297596; 53°27′36″N 0°06′09″W	1310283	Church of Saint Margaret More images
Church of Saint Peter	Humberston, North East Lincolnshire	Parish Church	15th century	4 January 1967	TA3109405278; 53°31′40″N 0°01′26″W	1161055	Church of Saint Peter More images
Church of St Peter and St Paul	Stallingborough, North East Lincolnshire	Parish Church	1779-81	4 January 1967	TA1950611837; 53°35′22″N 0°11′46″W	1346978	Church of St Peter and St Paul More images
Former Heavy Anti-aircraft Gun Site	Stallingborough, North East Lincolnshire	Heavy Anti Aircraft Battery	1944	23 May 2012	TA1841511627; 53°35′16″N 0°12′45″W	1403222	Upload Photo
Church of All Saints	Waltham, North East Lincolnshire	Parish Church	Late C13-Early 14th century	4 January 1967	TA2615103910; 53°31′00″N 0°05′56″W	1161283	Church of All Saints More images
Waltham Windmill	Waltham, North East Lincolnshire	Windmill	1880	28 April 1952	TA2595103280; 53°30′40″N 0°06′08″W	1161256	Waltham Windmill More images
Clee Hall Farmhouse	Old Clee, North East Lincolnshire	House	Late 17th century	6 June 1951	TA2909308307; 53°33′20″N 0°03′10″W	1379411	Upload Photo
Grimsby Haven Lock and Dock Wall 58 Metres Long Adjoining to West	The Docks, North East Lincolnshire	Canal Basin	1798-1799	30 June 1999	TA2721610587; 53°34′35″N 0°04′48″W	1379856	Upload Photo
Hydraulic Accumulator Tower to West of the Dock Tower	The Docks, North East Lincolnshire	Hydraulic Accumulator Tower	1892	31 October 1974	TA2779211379; 53°35′00″N 0°04′16″W	1379871	Upload Photo
The Grimsby Ice Factory including railings	The Docks, North East Lincolnshire	Factory	1900-1901	12 September 1990	TA2779910694; 53°34′38″N 0°04′17″W	1379842	The Grimsby Ice Factory including railings More images
