= Grade II* listed buildings in Fareham (borough) =

There are over 20,000 Grade II* listed buildings in England. This page is a list of these buildings in the district of Fareham in Hampshire.

== Fareham ==
| Name | Location | Type | Completed (Note: The date given is the date used by Historic England as significant for the initial building or that of an important part in the structure's description.) | Date designated | Grid ref. (Note: The grid reference is based on the British national grid reference system, sometimes known as OSGB36, used by the Ordnance Survey.) Geo-coordinates | Entry number (Note: The "List Entry Number" is a unique number assigned to each listed building and scheduled monument by Historic England.) | Image |
|---|---|---|---|---|---|---|---|
| Bishopwood | Fareham, Borough of Fareham | Cottage Ornee | Early 19th century | 18 October 1955 | SU5670606126; 50°51′07″N 1°11′45″W | 1093540 | Upload Photo |
| Brick Kiln, Chimney, Drying Sheds, Boiler and Engine House at Bursledon Brickworks South Section | Lower Swanwick | Brick Kiln | 1897 | 30 January 1981 | SU5000409819; 50°53′09″N 1°17′26″W | 1233725 | Brick Kiln, Chimney, Drying Sheds, Boiler and Engine House at Bursledon Brickworks South Section More images |
| Brooklands | Sarisbury | House | c1800 (pre 1807) | 22 October 1976 | SU4964408963; 50°52′41″N 1°17′45″W | 1093503 | Brooklands More images |
| Cams Hall | Fareham | Country House | Late 17th century | 18 October 1955 | SU5893605738; 50°50′53″N 1°09′51″W | 1232890 | Cams Hall More images |
| Church of the Holy Trinity | Fareham | Church | 1834-7 | 18 October 1955 | SU5758106176; 50°51′08″N 1°11′00″W | 1276622 | Church of the Holy Trinity More images |
| Crofton Old Church (St Edmund's) | Crofton | Chapel of Ease | 13th-century origins | 18 October 1955 | SU5510804183; 50°50′04″N 1°13′08″W | 1233279 | Crofton Old Church (St Edmund's) More images |
| Dean Farmhouse | Fareham | Timber Framed House | 16th century | 22 October 1976 | SU5738808211; 50°52′14″N 1°11′09″W | 1233656 | Dean Farmhouse |
| Fareham and County Club | Fareham | House | 18th century | 18 October 1955 | SU5827706324; 50°51′13″N 1°10′25″W | 1094245 | Fareham and County Club More images |
| Great Posbrook | Titchfield | House | 19th century | 18 October 1955 | SU5359205033; 50°50′32″N 1°14′25″W | 1233024 | Upload Photo |
| Kintyre House | Fareham | House | 18th century | 18 October 1955 | SU5826806273; 50°51′11″N 1°10′25″W | 1338894 | Kintyre House More images |
| Parish Church of St Peter and St Paul | Fareham | Parish Church | Medieval | 18 October 1955 | SU5817506502; 50°51′18″N 1°10′30″W | 1094332 | Parish Church of St Peter and St Paul More images |
| Southern Barn at Great Posbrook Farm | Titchfield | Aisled Barn | Late Medieval | 22 October 1976 | SU5353404978; 50°50′31″N 1°14′28″W | 1233029 | Upload Photo |
| The Old Manor House | Fareham | House | 18th century | 22 October 1976 | SU5818506667; 50°51′24″N 1°10′29″W | 1233542 | The Old Manor House More images |
| Tudor Wing, West Wing and Georgian House, St Margarets Priory | Titchfield | House | From 16th century | 18 October 1955 | SU5342106114; 50°51′08″N 1°14′33″W | 1276854 | Upload Photo |
| 28–30 South Street | Titchfield | House | Late 15th century to early 16th century | 18 October 1955 | SU5398505696; 50°50′54″N 1°14′04″W | 1276734 | 28–30 South Street More images |
| 69 High Street | Fareham | House | Older | 18 October 1955 | SU5827206306; 50°51′12″N 1°10′25″W | 1094246 | 69 High Street More images |
| 7 High Street | Fareham | House | 18th century | 18 October 1955 | SU5822606261; 50°51′11″N 1°10′27″W | 1094272 | 7 High Street More images |
| 12 High Street | Fareham | House | Late 18th century | 18 October 1955 | SU5823706309; 50°51′12″N 1°10′27″W | 1094273 | 12 High Street More images |
| 13–17 High Street | Fareham | House | 18th century | 18 October 1955 | SU5824106325; 50°51′13″N 1°10′26″W | 1351273 | 13–17 High Street More images |

== See also ==
- Listed buildings in Fareham
