= Grade II* listed buildings in South Holland =

There are over 20,000 Grade II* listed buildings in England. This page is a list of these buildings in the district of South Holland in Lincolnshire.

== South Holland ==
Name	Location	Type	Completed (Note: The date given is the date used by Historic England as significant for the initial building or that of an important part in the structure's description.)	Date designated	Grid ref. (Note: The grid reference is based on the British national grid reference system, sometimes known as OSGB36, used by the Ordnance Survey.) Geo-coordinates	Entry number (Note: The "List Entry Number" is a unique number assigned to each listed building and scheduled monument by Historic England.)	Image
The Manor House	Crowland, South Holland	House	c. 1775	7 February 1967	TF2398510260; 52°40′33″N 0°10′03″W	1359273	The Manor House More images
The Peacock Guest House	Donington, South Holland	House	Late 17th century	13 January 1988	TF2089035683; 52°54′18″N 0°12′14″W	1064450	The Peacock Guest House More images
Wikes Farmhouse	Donington, South Holland	Farmhouse	1680	13 January 1988	TF2314835407; 52°54′07″N 0°10′14″W	1359286	Upload Photo
36 Church Street	Donington, South Holland	House	Mid 18th century	7 February 1967	TF2085235905; 52°54′25″N 0°12′16″W	1064448	Upload Photo
Church of Holy Trinity	Gedney Hill, South Holland	Parish Church	Late 14th century	30 June 1966	TF3386811273; 52°40′57″N 0°01′16″W	1146771	Church of Holy Trinity More images
Cressy Hall	Gosberton, South Holland	House	1695	7 February 1967	TF2240430479; 52°51′28″N 0°11′00″W	1064460	Upload Photo
Garnsgate Hall with Wall and Railings	Lutton, South Holland	House	Early 18th century	30 June 1966	TF4191222624; 52°46′57″N 0°06′10″E	1359230	Garnsgate Hall with Wall and Railings More images
Chapel of St James	Moulton Chapel, Moulton, South Holland	Chapel of Ease	1722	7 February 1967	TF2934818231; 52°44′46″N 0°05′07″W	1359293	Chapel of St James More images
Crosskeys Bridge	River Nene, Sutton Bridge, South Holland	Swing Bridge	1897	11 January 1980	TF4821721030; 52°46′00″N 0°11′43″E	1064536	Crosskeys Bridge More images
East Lighthouse on Bank of River Nene	Sutton Bridge, South Holland	Lighthouse/House	C20	1 April 1980	TF4931025717; 52°48′30″N 0°12′49″E	1281069	East Lighthouse on Bank of River Nene More images
Hydraulic Engine House	Sutton Bridge, South Holland	Hydraulic Engine House	1897	11 January 1980	TF4800620902; 52°45′56″N 0°11′32″E	1204796	Hydraulic Engine House
West Lighthouse on Bank of River Nene	River Nene, Sutton Bridge, South Holland	House	C20	30 June 1966	TF4911625750; 52°48′31″N 0°12′39″E	1064537	West Lighthouse on Bank of River Nene More images
Tower to Church of St James	Sutton St James, South Holland	Tower	15th century	26 November 1987	TF3962518388; 52°44′42″N 0°04′01″E	1204853	Tower to Church of St James More images
Cley Hall	High St, Spalding, South Holland	Hotel	Mid 18th century	29 December 1950	TF2513922840; 52°47′19″N 0°08′45″W	1169039	Cley Hall
Constitutional Club	Spalding, South Holland	House	Mid 18th century	29 December 1950	TF2486222776; 52°47′17″N 0°09′00″W	1063999	Constitutional Club
East Elloe	High St., Spalding, South Holland	House	Late 18th century	29 December 1950	TF2521422981; 52°47′24″N 0°08′41″W	1359525	East Elloe
Garden Wall to No 21, High St	Spalding, South Holland	Garden Wall		20 November 1975	TF2510622816; 52°47′18″N 0°08′47″W	1063983	Upload Photo
Garden Wall to the South of No 4, Church St	Spalding, South Holland	Gate	18th century	20 November 1975	TF2501122496; 52°47′08″N 0°08′52″W	1147578	Upload Photo
Monk's House, Bourne Rd	Spalding, South Holland	House	Early 16th century	29 December 1950	TF2310022164; 52°46′59″N 0°10′35″W	1063993	Upload Photo
Old Office Block of Land Settlement Association	Low Fulney, South Holland	House	Medieval	19 December 1978	TF2712222352; 52°47′02″N 0°07′00″W	1359567	Upload Photo
Spalding High School for Girls	Spalding, South Holland	House	Mid 18th century	29 December 1950	TF2469822099; 52°46′55″N 0°09′09″W	1306654	Upload Photo
The Grange, Pinchbeck Rd	Spalding, South Holland	House	Mid 18th century	29 December 1950	TF2481422913; 52°47′22″N 0°09′02″W	1063959	Upload Photo
The Limes	Spalding, South Holland	House	Early 18th century	29 December 1950	TF2493822710; 52°47′15″N 0°08′56″W	1063971	The Limes More images
The Masters Lodge	Spalding, South Holland	House	1721	29 December 1950	TF2502522544; 52°47′10″N 0°08′51″W	1359534	Upload Photo
The Sycamores	Spalding, South Holland	House	Early 19th century	29 December 1950	TF2494922728; 52°47′16″N 0°08′55″W	1307194	The Sycamores More images
The Vicarage	Spalding, South Holland	House	Early 19th century	29 December 1950	TF2509022462; 52°47′07″N 0°08′48″W	1064006	The Vicarage
Vicarage to Church of St Paul	Fulney, South Holland	Vicarage	1877-1879	21 August 2007	TF2610223817; 52°47′50″N 0°07′52″W	1392209	Upload Photo
Welland Terrace	Spalding, South Holland	Terraced House	18th century	29 December 1950	TF2481622388; 52°47′05″N 0°09′03″W	1359539	Welland Terrace More images
Westbourne House	Spalding, South Holland	House	Mid 18th century	29 December 1950	TF2482622129; 52°46′56″N 0°09′02″W	1359518	Westbourne House
Westbourne Lodge	Spalding, South Holland	House	Mid 18th century	29 December 1950	TF2477822044; 52°46′54″N 0°09′05″W	1359519	Upload Photo
White Hart Hotel	Spalding, South Holland	Hotel	Mid 18th century	29 December 1950	TF2478622670; 52°47′14″N 0°09′04″W	1063953	White Hart Hotel
Willesby	Spalding, South Holland	House	Early 17th century	29 December 1950	TF2522323195; 52°47′30″N 0°08′40″W	1063991	Upload Photo
Wisteria Lodge	Spalding, South Holland	House	1792	29 December 1950	TF2498022529; 52°47′09″N 0°08′54″W	1147529	Wisteria Lodge
Yew Lodge	Spalding, South Holland	Country House	Mid-Late 18th century	29 December 1950	TF2511222810; 52°47′18″N 0°08′46″W	1359524	Upload Photo
34 London Road	Spalding, South Holland	House	Early 18th century	29 December 1950	TF2477722185; 52°46′58″N 0°09′05″W	1063947	Upload Photo
1 Sheep Market	Spalding, South Holland	Smiths Cottage	c. 1230	29 December 1950	TF2464622707; 52°47′15″N 0°09′11″W	1359545	Upload Photo
