= Grade II* listed buildings in Broxbourne (borough) =

There are over 20,000 Grade II* listed buildings in England. This page is a list of these buildings in the district of Broxbourne in Hertfordshire.

== Broxbourne ==
Name	Location	Type	Completed (Note: The date given is the date used by Historic England as significant for the initial building or that of an important part in the structure's description.)	Date designated	Grid ref. (Note: Sometimes known as OSGB36, the grid reference is based on the British national grid reference system used by the Ordnance Survey.) Geo-coordinates	Entry number (Note: The "List Entry Number" is a unique number assigned to each listed building and scheduled monument by Historic England.)	Image
Dewhurst St Mary JMI School	Cheshunt, Broxbourne	School	1640	11 June 1954	TL3502002574; 51°42′20″N 0°02′51″W	1296463	Upload Photo
Harold House	Waltham Cross, Broxbourne	House	1757	11 June 1954	TL3605900236; 51°41′04″N 0°02′00″W	1100566	Upload Photo
Jacobean Wing (east) and Victorian Wing (north) of Rawdon House	Hoddesdon, Broxbourne	House/Offices	1630-50	13 April 1961	TL3730208434; 51°45′28″N 0°00′43″W	1296072	Jacobean Wing (east) and Victorian Wing (north) of Rawdon House More images
Parish Church of St Lawrence	Wormley, Broxbourne	Parish Church	12th century	13 April 1961	TL3552005865; 51°44′06″N 0°02′20″W	1173566	Parish Church of St Lawrence More images
Parish Church of St Paul	Hoddesdon, Broxbourne	Parish Church	1732	13 April 1961	TL3729708965; 51°45′45″N 0°00′43″W	1100533	Parish Church of St Paul More images
Rathmore House	Hoddesdon, Broxbourne	House	1715	13 April 1961	TL3729708553; 51°45′32″N 0°00′44″W	1100523	Rathmore House More images
The Baas	Broxbourne	House	Late 15th century	7 September 1970	TL3558106574; 51°44′29″N 0°02′16″W	1348382	Upload Photo
The Lodge	Flamstead End, Broxbourne	House	17th century	8 November 1983	TL3437204032; 51°43′08″N 0°03′22″W	1100568	Upload Photo
The Swan Inn	Hoddesdon, Broxbourne	House	16th century	13 April 1961	TL3730508821; 51°45′40″N 0°00′43″W	1173914	The Swan Inn More images
Theobalds Park	Waltham Cross, Broxbourne	Country House/College/Hotel	1763	11 June 1954	TL3449200724; 51°41′21″N 0°03′21″W	1348341	Theobalds Park More images
Wormleybury Monument on south side of Lake	Wormley, Broxbourne	Commemorative Monument	c. 1770	13 April 1961	TL3559805578; 51°43′57″N 0°02′16″W	1296166	Upload Photo
