= Grade II* listed buildings in Rushmoor =

There are over 20,000 Grade II* listed buildings in England. This page is a list of these buildings in the district of Rushmoor in Hampshire.

== Rushmoor ==
Name	Location	Type	Completed (Note: The date given is the date used by Historic England as significant for the initial building or that of an important part in the structure's description.)	Date designated	Grid ref. (Note: Sometimes known as OSGB36, the grid reference is based on the British national grid reference system used by the Ordnance Survey.) Geo-coordinates	Entry number (Note: The "List Entry Number" is a unique number assigned to each listed building and scheduled monument by Historic England.)	Image
Aldershot Methodist Church	Aldershot, Rushmoor	Nonconformist Chapel	1875	30 April 1981	SU8610950662; 51°14′55″N 0°46′03″W	1155955	Aldershot Methodist Church More images
Beaumont Riding School	Aldershot, Rushmoor	Barracks	1856-9	29 March 1973	SU8538450640; 51°14′55″N 0°46′41″W	1092623	Beaumont Riding School More images
G1 Building at the Royal Aircraft Establishment (Trenchard House)	Farnborough, Rushmoor	Storehouse	1911	20 August 1979	SU8703354423; 51°16′56″N 0°45′13″W	1339706	G1 Building at the Royal Aircraft Establishment (Trenchard House) More images
