= Grade II* listed buildings in Gosport =

There are over 20,000 Grade II* listed buildings in England. This page is a list of these buildings in the district of Gosport in Hampshire.

== Gosport ==
Name	Location	Type	Completed (Note: The date given is the date used by Historic England as significant for the initial building or that of an important part in the structure's description.)	Date designated	Grid ref. (Note: Sometimes known as OSGB36, the grid reference is based on the British national grid reference system used by the Ordnance Survey.) Geo-coordinates	Entry number (Note: The "List Entry Number" is a unique number assigned to each listed building and scheduled monument by Historic England.)	Image
Chapel of St Luke, Royal Naval Hospital, Haslar	Gosport	Military Chapel	1762	20 April 1983	SZ6176198739; 50°47′06″N 1°07′31″W	1233560	Chapel of St Luke, Royal Naval Hospital, Haslar More images
Holy Trinity Church	Gosport	Bell Tower	1889	27 May 1953	SZ6212599649; 50°47′35″N 1°07′12″W	1234065	Holy Trinity Church More images
'e' Magazine (Building 436) and enclosing Walls	Hardway, Gosport	Magazine	1878 - 1879	19 January 1990	SU6153201273; 50°48′28″N 1°07′41″W	1234622	'e' Magazine (Building 436) and enclosing Walls More images
Fort Gilkicker	Gilkicker Point, Gosport	Fort	1865-1871	20 April 1983	SZ6065797494; 50°46′26″N 1°08′28″W	1276716	Fort Gilkicker More images
Granary, Bakery, Flour Mill, Stores, attached Boiler and Engine House	Royal Clarence Victualling Yard, Gosport	Flour Mill	1828-1829	13 August 1999	SU6180300673; 50°48′08″N 1°07′28″W	1244463	Granary, Bakery, Flour Mill, Stores, attached Boiler and Engine House More images
Main Gate and Two Lodges	Clarence Victualling Yard, Gosport	Gate Lodge	1830-1831	13 August 1999	SU6163100514; 50°48′03″N 1°07′37″W	1272344	Main Gate and Two Lodges More images
Quick Fire Shell Store (building 433) approx. 12m N of 'a' Magazine, Museum Buildings	Gosport	Boundary Wall	1770 - 1776	19 January 1990	SU6162301277; 50°48′28″N 1°07′36″W	1393251	Upload Photo
Railway Station Old Terminal	Gosport	Railway Station	c. 1842	10 March 1975	SU6140000167; 50°47′52″N 1°07′49″W	1234062	Railway Station Old Terminal More images
The Crescent	Anglesey, Gosport	Terraced House	1829	27 May 1953	SZ6036498468; 50°46′58″N 1°08′42″W	1233040	The Crescent More images
The Old Rectory Undercroft	Anglesey, Gosport	House	18th century	27 May 1953	SZ6020398797; 50°47′08″N 1°08′50″W	1276935	The Old Rectory Undercroft More images
Ward Blocks A, B, C, D, E, F and Centre at Royal Naval Hospital, Haslar	Gosport	Royal Naval Hospital	1746-1762	20 April 1983	SZ6190698869; 50°47′10″N 1°07′23″W	1233242	Ward Blocks A, B, C, D, E, F and Centre at Royal Naval Hospital, Haslar More images
No. 2 Battery	Gosport	Gun battery	1860	20 April 1983	SZ5869098925; 50°47′13″N 1°10′08″W	1276305	No. 2 Battery More images
