= Grade II* listed buildings in Three Rivers =

There are over 20,000 Grade II* listed buildings in England. This page is a list of these buildings in the district of Three Rivers in Hertfordshire.

== Three Rivers ==
Name	Location	Type	Completed (Note: The date given is the date used by Historic England as significant for the initial building or that of an important part in the structure's description.)	Date designated	Grid ref. (Note: The grid reference is based on the British national grid reference system, sometimes known as OSGB36, used by the Ordnance Survey.) Geo-coordinates	Entry number (Note: The "List Entry Number" is a unique number assigned to each listed building and scheduled monument by Historic England.)	Image
Church of St Paul	Langleybury, Abbots Langley, Three Rivers	Parish Church	1863-5	3 October 1985	TL0805300569; 51°41′37″N 0°26′17″W	1100890	Church of St Paul More images
Hunton Park	Hunton Bridge, Abbots Langley, Three Rivers	Country House	1909	31 May 1985	TL0892200525; 51°41′35″N 0°25′32″W	1173193	Hunton Park More images
Langleybury House (the Mansion and Flats 1 to 6 Inclusive)	Langleybury, Abbots Langley, Three Rivers	Apartment	1727	1 September 1953	TL0775700200; 51°41′25″N 0°26′33″W	1173157	Upload Photo
The King's Lodge	Hunton Bridge, Abbots Langley, Three Rivers	House	c. 1640	2 April 1966	TL0835400570; 51°41′36″N 0°26′01″W	1100913	The King's Lodge More images
Tithe Barn about 20m north-east of Parsonage Farm	Abbots Langley, Three Rivers	Tithe Barn	15th century	17 October 1977	TL0954202610; 51°42′42″N 0°24′57″W	1100908	Tithe Barn about 20m north-east of Parsonage Farm
Christ Church	Chorleywood, Three Rivers	Parish Church	1845	16 July 1975	TQ0360096572; 51°39′30″N 0°30′13″W	1348233	Christ Church More images
Kings John's Farm, Penn Cottage, Penn Farm and Garden Wall	Chorleywood, Three Rivers	House	c. 1910	19 May 1950	TQ0271295321; 51°38′50″N 0°31′01″W	1100897	Upload Photo
Church of the Holy Cross	Church End, Sarratt, Three Rivers	Parish Church	Late 12th century	1 September 1953	TQ0387498398; 51°40′29″N 0°29′57″W	1348246	Church of the Holy Cross More images
Little Winch	Chipperfield, Sarratt, Three Rivers	House	1935	3 October 1985	TL0383301182; 51°41′59″N 0°29′56″W	1100809	Upload Photo
Redheath	Croxley Heath, Sarratt, Three Rivers	Country House/School	16th century	1 September 1953	TQ0665796985; 51°39′42″N 0°27′34″W	1347875	Redheath More images
The Grove	Sarratt, Three Rivers	Country House	Late 16th century	15 November 1973	TQ0821298789; 51°40′39″N 0°26′11″W	1101580	The Grove More images
Oxhey Chapel	Oxhey, Watford Rural, Three Rivers	Chapel	1612	1 September 1953	TQ1136493347; 51°37′41″N 0°23′33″W	1174300	Oxhey Chapel More images
Oxhey Hall	Oxhey, Watford Rural, Three Rivers	House	Early 17th century	3 October 1985	TQ1036794368; 51°38′14″N 0°24′24″W	1347877	Upload Photo
Tithe Barn at Croxley Hall Farm	Croxley Hall Farm, Three Rivers	Tithe Barn	1396-1401	2 April 1970	TQ0699994592; 51°38′24″N 0°27′19″W	1296113	Upload Photo
