= Grade II* listed buildings in Hart =

There are over 20,000 Grade II* listed buildings in England. This page is a list of these buildings in the district of Hart in Hampshire.

== Hart ==
| Name | Location | Type | Completed (Note: The date given is the date used by Historic England as significant for the initial building or that of an important part in the structure's description.) | Date designated | Grid ref. (Note: Sometimes known as OSGB36, the grid reference is based on the British national grid reference system used by the Ordnance Survey.) Geo-coordinates | Entry number (Note: The "List Entry Number" is a unique number assigned to each listed building and scheduled monument by Historic England.) | Image |
|---|---|---|---|---|---|---|---|
| Minley Manor | Blackwater and Hawley, Hart | House | 1858-1860 | 26 June 1987 | SU8222758001; 51°18′55″N 0°49′18″W | 1258061 | Minley Manor More images |
| Moor Place Farm House | Bramshill, Hart | Farmhouse | 16th century | 8 July 1952 | SU7530060743; 51°20′27″N 0°55′13″W | 1340031 | Upload Photo |
| Christ Church | Church Crookham, Hart | Meeting Hall | 1971 | 19 May 1993 | SU8077951804; 51°15′35″N 0°50′37″W | 1244780 | Christ Church More images |
| Firgrove House | Eversley, Hart | House | Early 18th century | 8 July 1952 | SU7993760689; 51°20′23″N 0°51′14″W | 1092336 | Firgrove House More images |
| The Old Rectory | Eversley, Hart | House | 18th century | 8 July 1952 | SU7790260880; 51°20′30″N 0°52′59″W | 1092335 | The Old Rectory More images |
| Church of All Saints | Fleet, Hart | Church | 1862 | 26 June 1987 | SU8080854507; 51°17′02″N 0°50′34″W | 1339861 | Church of All Saints More images |
| Church Cottage | Greywell, Hart | House | 16th century | 8 July 1952 | SU7172151049; 51°15′15″N 0°58′25″W | 1339865 | Upload Photo |
| Church of St Mary the Virgin | Greywell, Hart | Church | Norman | 24 November 1961 | SU7184150972; 51°15′12″N 0°58′19″W | 1117033 | Church of St Mary the Virgin More images |
| Barn and attached Outbuildings at Lodge Farm to North West of Farmhouse | Elvetham Park, Hartley Wintney, Hart | House | Mid 19th century | 26 June 1987 | SU7801256273; 51°18′01″N 0°52′57″W | 1092287 | Upload Photo |
| Church of St Mary | Hartley Wintney, Hart | Church | Medieval | 24 November 1961 | SU7677855872; 51°17′49″N 0°54′01″W | 1092270 | Church of St Mary More images |
| Elvetham Hall House | Elvetham Park, Hartley Wintney, Hart | House | 1859-1862 | 19 July 1973 | SU7819456389; 51°18′05″N 0°52′47″W | 1092322 | Elvetham Hall House More images |
| Four Acre House | Hartley Wintney, Hart | House | 1901 | 26 June 1987 | SU7520356342; 51°18′04″N 0°55′22″W | 1339875 | Four Acre House |
| The Barn | Phoenix Green, Hartley Wintney, Hart | House | c. 1903 | 14 October 1986 | SU7581555800; 51°17′47″N 0°54′50″W | 1242682 | Upload Photo |
| West Green House | West Green, Hartley Wintney, Hart | Country House | Early 18th century | 8 July 1952 | SU7455456360; 51°18′05″N 0°55′55″W | 1242807 | West Green House More images |
| Wintney Farm Barn to West of Farmhouse | Hartley Wintney, Hart | Wall | founded 1190 | 8 July 1952 | SU7763655218; 51°17′27″N 0°53′17″W | 1092276 | Upload Photo |
| Church of St Michael | Heckfield, Hart | Church | Medieval | 24 November 1961 | SU7226260501; 51°20′20″N 0°57′50″W | 1092243 | Church of St Michael More images |
| Highfield House | Heckfield, Hart | House | Early 18th century | 8 July 1952 | SU7221360451; 51°20′19″N 0°57′53″W | 1258374 | Upload Photo |
| Borough Court | Hook, Hart | House | 16th century | 26 June 1987 | SU7380355905; 51°17′51″N 0°56′34″W | 1339893 | Upload Photo |
| Barn at Summers Farm to East of Farmhouse | Long Sutton, Hart | Cruck Barn | 1441-2 | 26 June 1987 | SU7515947024; 51°13′03″N 0°55′31″W | 1339897 | Upload Photo |
| Church of All Saints | Long Sutton, Hart | Church | 13th century | 24 November 1961 | SU7388947381; 51°13′15″N 0°56′36″W | 1092232 | Church of All Saints More images |
| Long Sutton Manor | Long Sutton, Hart | House | 17th century | 26 June 1987 | SU7382647451; 51°13′17″N 0°56′39″W | 1258941 | Upload Photo |
| The Old Parsonage | Long Sutton, Hart | House | 17th century | 8 July 1952 | SU7393547384; 51°13′15″N 0°56′34″W | 1339896 | Upload Photo |
| Hazeley Heath Cottage | Hazeley Heath, Mattingley, Hart | House | 1898 | 26 June 1987 | SU7473258417; 51°19′12″N 0°55′44″W | 1243551 | Hazeley Heath Cottage More images |
| Almshouses | Odiham, Hart | Almshouses | 1628 | 8 July 1952 | SU7406050854; 51°15′07″N 0°56′25″W | 1092192 | Almshouses More images |
| King's Barn | Odiham, Hart | House | c. 1780 | 8 July 1952 | SU7393451018; 51°15′13″N 0°56′31″W | 1244231 | King's Barn More images |
| Lodge Farmhouse | Odiham, Hart | Farmhouse | 15th century | 8 July 1952 | SU7364352567; 51°16′03″N 0°56′45″W | 1092163 | Upload Photo |
| Mary Court, including attached Gate Pier | Odiham, Hart | House | Early 18th century | 8 July 1952 | SU7422251096; 51°15′15″N 0°56′16″W | 1244132 | Mary Court, including attached Gate Pier More images |
| The George Hotel | Odiham, Hart | Steps | 16th century | 8 July 1952 | SU7405151088; 51°15′15″N 0°56′25″W | 1092149 | The George Hotel More images |
| The Old House (48, High St) | Odiham, Hart | House | Late 18th century | 8 July 1952 | SU7421051125; 51°15′16″N 0°56′17″W | 1339905 | The Old House (48, High St) More images |
| The Priory | Odiham, Hart | House | 16th century | 8 July 1952 | SU7379551057; 51°15′14″N 0°56′38″W | 1092156 | The Priory More images |
| The White House | Odiham, Hart | House | 1812 | 8 July 1952 | SU7424251142; 51°15′17″N 0°56′15″W | 1092174 | Upload Photo |
| Archway at southern End of Laundry Court, leading to rear of Kitchen Gardens, and Garden House attached to south | Rotherwick, Hart | Wall | 1901-1904 | 26 June 1987 | SU7101355140; 51°17′28″N 0°58′59″W | 1272254 | Archway at southern End of Laundry Court, leading to rear of Kitchen Gardens, and Garden House attached to south More images |
| Rotherwick Church | Rotherwick, Hart | Church | 13th century | 24 November 1961 | SU7117356263; 51°18′04″N 0°58′50″W | 1244570 | Rotherwick Church More images |
| Main and Subsidiary Blocks at Tylney Hall | Rotherwick, Hart | Country house | 1879 | 16 March 1984 | SU7095055245; 51°17′31″N 0°59′02″W | 1244655 | Main and Subsidiary Blocks at Tylney Hall More images |
| North Terrace with Sunken Garden and Pavilion | Rotherwick, Hart | Balustrade | c. 1900 | 16 March 1984 | SU7092055277; 51°17′32″N 0°59′04″W | 1244657 | Upload Photo |
| Walled Gardens, Cottages, Greenhouses and Tower to South West of Tylney Hall | Rotherwick, Hart | House | 1899-1904 | 16 March 1984 | SU7088755129; 51°17′27″N 0°59′05″W | 1244656 | Upload Photo |
| Blounce Farmhouse | South Warnborough, Hart | Farmhouse | dated 1699 | 8 July 1952 | SU7126845320; 51°12′10″N 0°58′53″W | 1272245 | Upload Photo |
| Church of St Andrew | South Warnborough, Hart | Church | 13th century | 24 November 1961 | SU7215747192; 51°13′10″N 0°58′06″W | 1244695 | Church of St Andrew More images |
| Winchfield House | Winchfield House, Winchfield, Hart | Country House | Late 18th century | 8 July 1952 | SU7612555117; 51°17′24″N 0°54′35″W | 1244740 | Upload Photo |
| Yateley Hall | Yateley, Hart | House | Early 18th century | 8 July 1952 | SU8140860511; 51°20′16″N 0°49′58″W | 1272233 | Yateley Hall More images |
