= Grade II* listed buildings in Portsmouth =

There are over 20,000 Grade II* listed buildings in England. This page is a list of these buildings in the City of Portsmouth in Hampshire.

== City of Portsmouth ==
| Name | Location | Type | Completed (Note: The date given is the date used by Historic England as significant for the initial building or that of an important part in the structure's description.) | Date designated | Grid ref. (Note: Sometimes known as OSGB36, the grid reference is based on the British national grid reference system used by the Ordnance Survey.) Geo-coordinates | Entry number (Note: The "List Entry Number" is a unique number assigned to each listed building and scheduled monument by Historic England.) | Image |
|---|---|---|---|---|---|---|---|
| The Kings Theatre | Southsea, City of Portsmouth | Apartment | 1907 | 4 March 1976 | SZ6486599005; 50°47′13″N 1°04′52″W | 1386801 | The Kings Theatre More images |
| Buckingham House | City of Portsmouth | Apartment | 1953 | 10 January 1953 | SZ6347899493; 50°47′30″N 1°06′03″W | 1104356 | Buckingham House More images |
| Church of St Agatha | Landport, City of Portsmouth | Exhibition Hall | 1990 | 30 October 1969 | SU6407000697; 50°48′08″N 1°05′32″W | 1245260 | Church of St Agatha More images |
| Church of St George | Portsea, City of Portsmouth | Church | 1754 | 10 January 1953 | SU6332000087; 50°47′49″N 1°06′11″W | 1387161 | Church of St George More images |
| Church of St Mary, Kingston | Fratton, City of Portsmouth | Church | 1887-1889 | 10 January 1953 | SU6518900850; 50°48′13″N 1°04′35″W | 1104279 | Church of St Mary, Kingston More images |
| Church of St Peter and St Paul | Wymering, City of Portsmouth | Church | Medieval | 10 January 1953 | SU6503105541; 50°50′45″N 1°04′40″W | 1245265 | Church of St Peter and St Paul More images |
| Admiralty House (Building No 1/20) and attached Railings | H.M. Naval Base, City of Portsmouth | Naval Officers House | 1784-1786 | 13 August 1999 | SU6311800505; 50°48′02″N 1°06′21″W | 1244604 | Admiralty House (Building No 1/20) and attached Railings More images |
| Victory Gate and Dockyard Wall | H.M. Naval Base, City of Portsmouth | Gate | 1704-1712 | 13 August 1999 | SU6309800391; 50°47′59″N 1°06′22″W | 1244581 | Victory Gate and Dockyard Wall More images |
| Fire Station (Building No 1/77) | H.M. Naval Base, City of Portsmouth | Water Tower | 1843-1844 | 13 August 1999 | SU6307200622; 50°48′06″N 1°06′23″W | 1272306 | Upload Photo |
| Former Royal Naval Academy (Buildings Nos 1/14, 1/116-19) and attached Railings | H.M. Naval Base, City of Portsmouth | Officers' Mess | 1999 | 13 August 1999 | SU6313700446; 50°48′01″N 1°06′20″W | 1244573 | Former Royal Naval Academy (Buildings Nos 1/14, 1/116-19) and attached Railings More images |
| Fort Cumberland | Eastney, City of Portsmouth | Fort | 1786 | 30 October 1969 | SZ6828399138; 50°47′16″N 1°01′58″W | 1104273 | Fort Cumberland More images |
| Fort Purbrook (that part in Portsmouth Church Parish) | City of Portsmouth | Fort | c. 1860 | 30 October 1969 | SU6783706371; 50°51′10″N 1°02′16″W | 1387127 | Fort Purbrook (that part in Portsmouth Church Parish) More images |
| Fort Widley | City of Portsmouth | Barracks | c. 1913 | 30 October 1969 | SU6567506434; 50°51′13″N 1°04′06″W | 1387128 | Fort Widley More images |
| Iron Foundry (Building No 1/140), including Railings and Bollards | H.M. Naval Base, City of Portsmouth | Cannon Bollard | Mid-Late 19th century | 13 August 1999 | SU6309900831; 50°48′13″N 1°06′21″W | 1272310 | Iron Foundry (Building No 1/140), including Railings and Bollards |
| Long Row (Building Nos 1/124-132) and attached Walls (Spithead House) | H.M. Naval Base, City of Portsmouth | House | 1999 | 13 August 1999 | SU6309500720; 50°48′09″N 1°06′22″W | 1272307 | Upload Photo |
| No 15 Store (Building Number 1/62) and Bollard at South East Corner | H.M. Naval Base, City of Portsmouth | Cannon Bollard | Mid/Late C20 | 13 August 1999 | SU6297600507; 50°48′03″N 1°06′28″W | 1272262 | No 15 Store (Building Number 1/62) and Bollard at South East Corner |
| No 16 Store (Building No 1/63) and Bollard at South West Corner | H.M. Naval Base, City of Portsmouth | Cannon Bollard | Mid/Late 19th century | 13 August 1999 | SU6303800525; 50°48′03″N 1°06′25″W | 1272263 | No 16 Store (Building No 1/63) and Bollard at South West Corner |
| No 17 Store (Building No 1/64) and Bollards at North West and South West Corners | H.M. Naval Base, City of Portsmouth | Cannon Bollard | Mid/Late C20 | 13 August 1999 | SU6310100546; 50°48′04″N 1°06′21″W | 1272265 | Upload Photo |
| No 2 Ship Shop (Building Number 1/208) | H.M. Naval Base, City of Portsmouth | Turning Shop | 1846-1849 | 13 August 1999 | SU6293500954; 50°48′17″N 1°06′30″W | 1272270 | No 2 Ship Shop (Building Number 1/208) More images |
| No 25 Store (Building No 1/118) | H.M. Naval Base, City of Portsmouth | Workshop | 1782 | 13 August 1999 | SU6301700652; 50°48′07″N 1°06′26″W | 1244578 | Upload Photo |
| No 6 Boathouse (Building No 1/23) and Slipway to Front | H.M. Naval Base, City of Portsmouth | Boat House | Later alterations | 13 August 1999 | SU6304400421; 50°48′00″N 1°06′24″W | 1244594 | No 6 Boathouse (Building No 1/23) and Slipway to Front More images |
| Nos 10 to 14 and attached Railings and Walls (Building Nos 1/68-72) | H.M. Naval Base, City of Portsmouth | House | 1999 | 13 August 1999 | SU6320700616; 50°48′06″N 1°06′16″W | 1244549 | Nos 10 to 14 and attached Railings and Walls (Building Nos 1/68-72) |
| Nos 18 and 19 Stores with linking and attached Bollards (Buildings Nos 1/65 and 75) | H.M. Naval Base, City of Portsmouth | Stores | Late C18/Early 19th century | 13 August 1999 | SU6309200576; 50°48′05″N 1°06′22″W | 1272305 | Nos 18 and 19 Stores with linking and attached Bollards (Buildings Nos 1/65 and 75) |
| Porters Lodge (Building No 1/7) | H.M. Naval Base, City of Portsmouth | Porters Lodge | c. 1708 | 13 August 1999 | SU6301800321; 50°47′57″N 1°06′26″W | 1244584 | Porters Lodge (Building No 1/7) More images |
| South Office Block (Building No 1/88) | H.M. Naval Base, City of Portsmouth | Storehouse | 1789 | 13 August 1999 | SU6292300572; 50°48′05″N 1°06′30″W | 1272314 | South Office Block (Building No 1/88) More images |
| No 2, St Georges Way and attached Garden Wall | Portsea, City of Portsmouth | House | Late 18th century | 30 October 1969 | SU6351500241; 50°47′54″N 1°06′00″W | 1387162 | No 2, St Georges Way and attached Garden Wall |
| The Beneficial School | Portsea, City of Portsmouth | School | 1784 | 10 January 1953 | SU6332700221; 50°47′53″N 1°06′10″W | 1271859 | The Beneficial School More images |
| New Theatre Royal | Landport, City of Portsmouth | Public Hall | 1854 | 30 October 1969 | SU6400200048; 50°47′47″N 1°05′36″W | 1104328 | New Theatre Royal More images |
| Wymering Manor | Cosham, City of Portsmouth | House | Extended c1900 - before 1908 | 10 January 1953 | SU6499305588; 50°50′46″N 1°04′42″W | 1245180 | Wymering Manor More images |
| 1, 3 and 5 Lombard Street | City of Portsmouth | House | Mid to Late 17th century | 10 January 1953 | SZ6324699436; 50°47′28″N 1°06′15″W | 1103826 | 1, 3 and 5 Lombard Street More images |
| 3 Penny Street | City of Portsmouth | House | Late C18/Early 19th century | 30 October 1969 | SZ6347099388; 50°47′26″N 1°06′03″W | 1103863 | 3 Penny Street |
| 1 Penny Street | City of Portsmouth | House | Late 18th century | 10 January 1953 | SZ6348099395; 50°47′26″N 1°06′03″W | 1103861 | 1 Penny Street More images |
| City of Portsmouth War Memorial | Guildhall Square | War memorial | 1921 | 19 October 1921 | SU6405100226 | 1104318 | City of Portsmouth War Memorial More images |
