= Grade II* listed buildings in the City and District of St Albans =

There are over 20,000 Grade II* listed buildings in England. This page is a list of these buildings in the City and District of St Albans in Hertfordshire.

== St. Albans ==
Name	Location	Type	Completed (Note: The date given is the date used by Historic England as significant for the initial building or that of an important part in the structure's description.)	Date designated	Grid ref. (Note: Sometimes known as OSGB36, the grid reference is based on the British national grid reference system used by the Ordnance Survey.) Geo-coordinates	Entry number (Note: The "List Entry Number" is a unique number assigned to each listed building and scheduled monument by Historic England.)	Image
Bowers House	1-4 High Street, Harpenden, St. Albans	House	Early 17th century	26 July 1951	TL1339014434; 51°49′01″N 0°21′23″W	1102993	Bowers House More images
Cross Farmhouse	Harpenden, St. Albans	Farmhouse	Late 15th century or early 16th century	26 July 1951	TL1510512911; 51°48′11″N 0°19′55″W	1347173	Upload Photo
Faulkners End Farmhouse	Kinsbourne Green, Harpenden, St. Albans	Farmhouse	Late 15th century	7 February 1974	TL1131815081; 51°49′24″N 0°23′10″W	1102973	Upload Photo
Harpenden Hall	Harpenden, St. Albans	House	16th century	26 July 1951	TL1357714139; 51°48′52″N 0°21′14″W	1103002	Harpenden Hall
Harpenden House Hotel	Harpenden, St. Albans	Town House	Late 17th century	26 July 1951	TL1368913978; 51°48′46″N 0°21′08″W	1347178	Harpenden House Hotel More images
Parish Church of St Nicholas	Harpenden, St. Albans	Parish Church	15th century	26 July 1951	TL1326514427; 51°49′01″N 0°21′30″W	1347212	Parish Church of St Nicholas More images
Hammonds End House	Harpenden Rural, St. Albans	Country House	c1700-1710	11 August 1955	TL1237412241; 51°47′51″N 0°22′19″W	1295656	Upload Photo
Harpendenbury Farmhouse	Harpenden Rural, St. Albans	Farmhouse	15th century or early 16th century	27 September 1984	TL1084013994; 51°48′49″N 0°23′37″W	1174608	Upload Photo
All Saints Pastoral Centre, including Chapel	London Colney, St. Albans	Chapel	1927-1964	23 June 1972	TL1750002827; 51°42′43″N 0°18′03″W	1295615	All Saints Pastoral Centre, including Chapel More images
Cumberland House, including Front Wall and Railings	Redbourn Common, Redbourn, St. Albans	House	1974	19 October 1953	TL1063312266; 51°47′53″N 0°23′49″W	1102901	Cumberland House, including Front Wall and Railings More images
Redbournbury	Redbourn, St. Albans	Farmhouse	15th century	27 September 1984	TL1202810736; 51°47′03″N 0°22′38″W	1347213	Upload Photo
Redbournbury Mill, including Front Railings	Redbourn, St. Albans	Mill House	Mid 18th century	27 September 1984	TL1185510775; 51°47′04″N 0°22′47″W	1175121	Redbournbury Mill, including Front Railings More images
The Priory	Redbourn, St. Albans	Town House	c1710-20	19 October 1953	TL1078312237; 51°47′52″N 0°23′42″W	1295534	The Priory More images
Church of St Leonard	Sandridge, St. Albans	Parish Church	Late 11th century	19 October 1953	TL1712410554; 51°46′53″N 0°18′13″W	1308298	Church of St Leonard More images
Gorhambury (New Gorhambury House)	St Michael, St. Albans	Country House	1777-84	19 October 1953	TL1137407850; 51°45′30″N 0°23′16″W	1102915	Gorhambury (New Gorhambury House) More images
Temple Cottage (300 Metres South of Old Gorhambury)	St. Michael, St. Albans	House	Late 19th century	27 September 1984	TL1106707320; 51°45′13″N 0°23′32″W	1102918	Temple Cottage (300 Metres South of Old Gorhambury) More images
Westwick Cottage	St. Michael, St. Albans	House	16th century	19 October 1953	TL0915706631; 51°44′52″N 0°25′13″W	1102898	Westwick Cottage More images
Burstone Manor House	How Wood, St. Stephen, St. Albans	House	12th century	19 October 1953	TL1353403713; 51°43′14″N 0°21′28″W	1102862	Upload Photo
Bride Hall	Wheathampstead, St. Albans	Manor House	Late 16th century	19 October 1953	TL1905115943; 51°49′46″N 0°16′26″W	1347258	Upload Photo
Hyde Mill Granary and Store (that part in Wheathampstead)	Wheathampstead, St. Albans	Corn Mill	Late 19th century	22 June 1998	TL1323216990; 51°50′24″N 0°21′28″W	1119789	Hyde Mill Granary and Store (that part in Wheathampstead)
Waterend House	Waterend, Wheathampstead, St. Albans	House	Mid 17th century	19 October 1953	TL2039313849; 51°48′37″N 0°15′18″W	1103637	Waterend House More images
Abbey Gate House	St. Albans	Villa	Early 19th century	27 August 1971	TL1434807069; 51°45′02″N 0°20′42″W	1347098	Upload Photo
Church of St Peter	St. Albans	Parish Hall	1992	8 May 1950	TL1500607631; 51°45′20″N 0°20′07″W	1103057	Church of St Peter More images
Church of St Stephen	St. Albans	Parish Hall	1989-1991	8 May 1950	TL1413606074; 51°44′30″N 0°20′54″W	1295653	Church of St Stephen More images
Court House (Town Hall)	St. Albans	Court House	1826	8 May 1950	TL1475207246; 51°45′08″N 0°20′20″W	1296135	Court House (Town Hall) More images
Darrowfield House	St. Albans	House	1950	8 May 1950	TL1367607331; 51°45′11″N 0°21′16″W	1103086	Darrowfield House More images
Holywell House	St. Albans	House	1785	8 May 1950	TL1463906964; 51°44′59″N 0°20′27″W	1103099	Holywell House More images
Kingsbury Barn	St. Albans	Grange Barn	1390s	27 August 1971	TL1386007557; 51°45′19″N 0°21′07″W	1347102	Kingsbury Barn
Manor Garden House	135 Fishpool Street, St Albans	House	17th century	8 May 1950	TL1395007426; 51°45′14″N 0°21′02″W	1103113	Manor Garden House
Romeland House	St. Albans	House	Mid 18th century	8 May 1950	TL1439007217; 51°45′07″N 0°20′39″W	1103080	Romeland House More images
St Michael's Manor House	St. Albans	Manor House	Late 17th century	8 May 1950	TL1402007364; 51°45′12″N 0°20′58″W	1347093	St Michael's Manor House
The Crown and Anchor	St. Albans	Shop	15th century	27 August 1971	TL1464606892; 51°44′56″N 0°20′26″W	1103095	The Crown and Anchor More images
The Grange	16 St Peter's Street, St. Albans	House	Late 18th century	8 May 1950	TL1487007357; 51°45′11″N 0°20′14″W	1174089	The Grange More images
The Tudor Tavern	St. Albans	Public House	Modern	8 May 1950	TL1457807164; 51°45′05″N 0°20′30″W	1347120	The Tudor Tavern More images
The White Hart	23 Holywell Hill, St Albans	Inn	17th century	8 May 1950	TL1468006991; 51°45′00″N 0°20′25″W	1347142	The White Hart More images
13 Fishpool Street	St. Albans	House	late C16-early 17th century	8 May 1950	TL1427407162; 51°45′05″N 0°20′45″W	1103153	Upload Photo
2 Sopwell Lane	St. Albans	Lodging House	16th century	27 August 1971	TL1466706887; 51°44′56″N 0°20′25″W	1347166	2 Sopwell Lane More images
107 St Peter's Street	St. Albans	House	Early 18th century	8 May 1950	TL1496207654; 51°45′21″N 0°20′09″W	1103049	107 St Peter's Street More images
