= Cams Estate =

400-acre private estate in Fareham UK

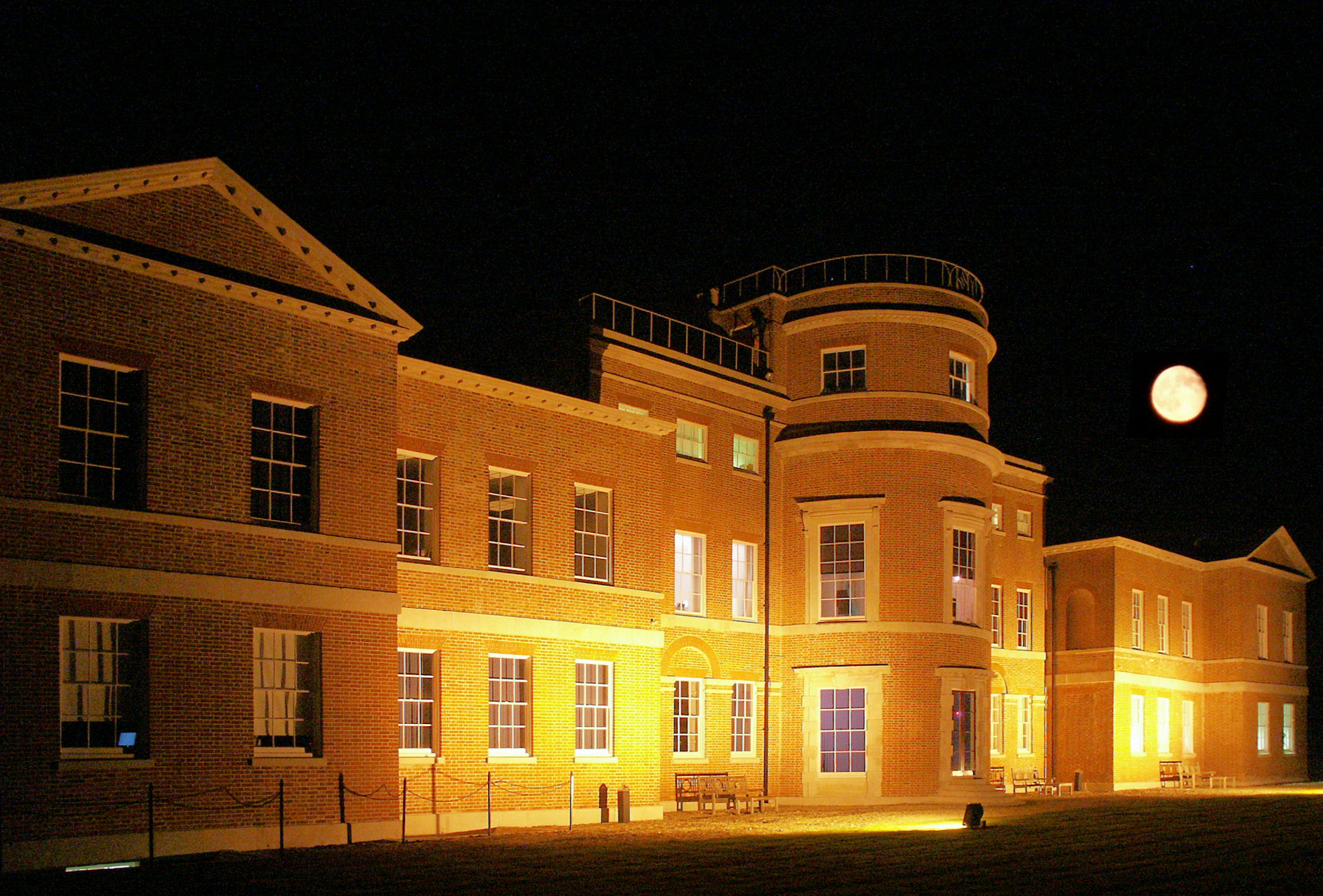
Cams Hall

Cams Estate is a 400-acre private estate in Fareham UK. The estate is mainly surrounded by tidal waters and is located at the northern extremity of Fareham Creek. Today it is a golf course and business park with a strong technology theme among the business residents.

== Coastal path ==
The Marine and Coastal Access Act 2009 created a right of way around the entire UK coastline including Cams Estate. Modifications were made in 2010 to complete the route and it is now included in the local Council's walks

== History ==
Dating back to the 13th Century, a manor house is recorded at Cams Estate. In the eighteenth century, General John Carnac, a senior official of the East India Company, had most of the current house designed by Jacob LeRoux, to create a spacious mansion with a classically pedimented facade and grand south-facing rooms looking over Fareham creek.

In 1781 the Delmé family moved from Titchfield Abbey to occupy the mansion and then spent a small fortune on part-rebuilding and enlarging the house. This superb mansion was known locally as Cams Hall and remained in the hands of the Delmé Family for over 100 years.

Ownership passed to Montague Foster in the 19th century. It later had various uses, including a period under the Admiralty in World War II.

During the 1950s, a caravan park was started and the land was farmed by the Hill Family. This is the source of the "Cams Hill" Estate title. However, the Estate soon fell into disrepair after the then owner, Charles Church, was killed in a plane crash.

In the early 1990s, Strand Harbour Securities began a period of renovation. This included repairs to the Manor House, the Home Farm and Walled Garden, and also the sale of a portion of the estate for the construction of a golf course.

In 1995 a modern office block - "Delmé Place" - was built with many design references to the original house including two rotundas and an obvious nominal nod to the estate's historic owners.

In 1998 it was proposed as a landing point for the Project Oxygen (Global_Fibre_Link) causing significant investment from local business and the council to promote the estate.

In 2001 a future office park was added called Carnac Court (again a reference to the Estate's past).

== Today ==
Today the estate is a conservation area, with all buildings being listed buildings. It has a nine-hole and 18-hole golf course; the manor house is now a prestigious executive suite, and the home farm serves as a number of smaller offices with two large developments providing modern office space.

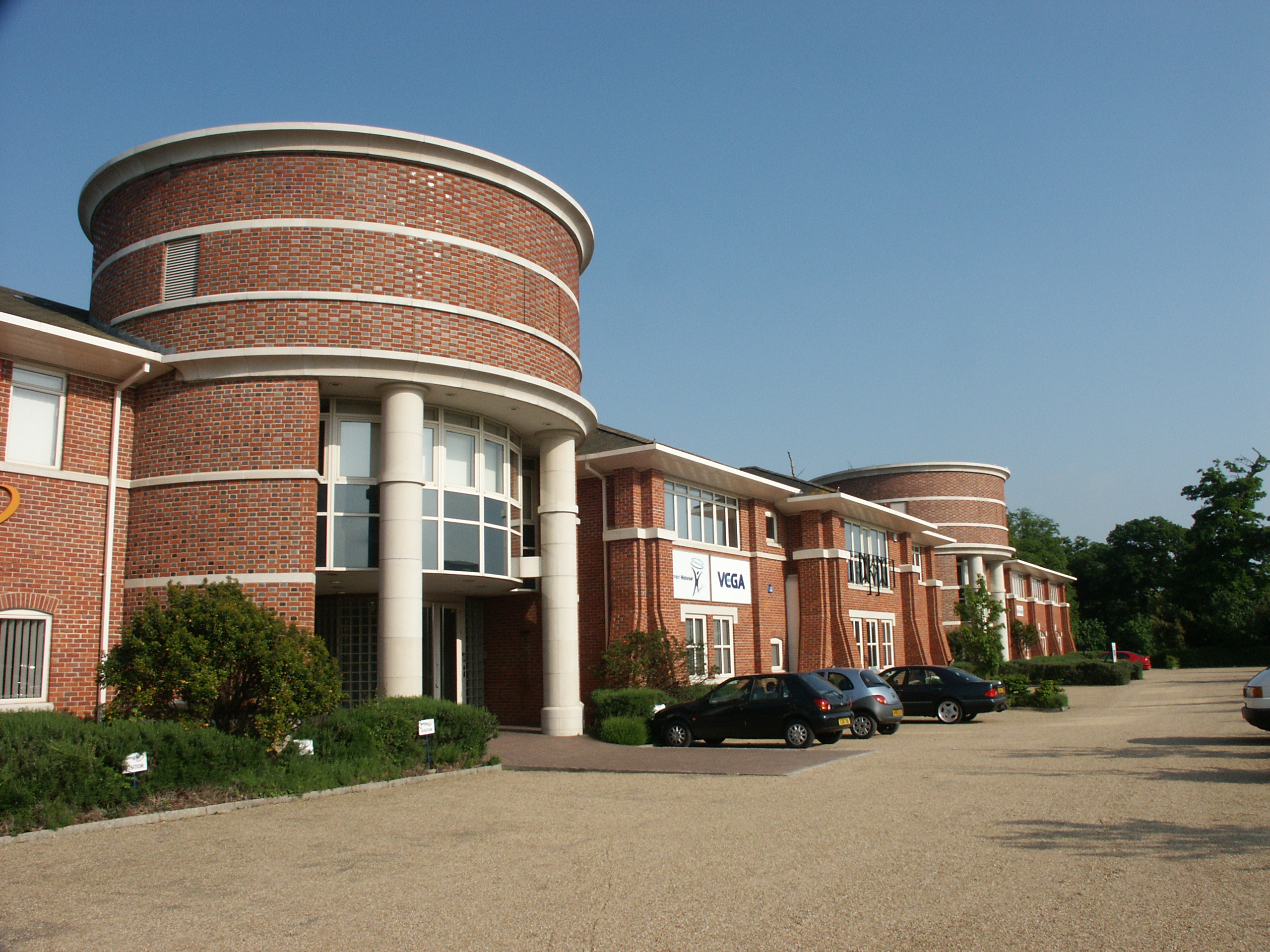
Delme Place

== See also ==
- Cams Hall
