= Fareham Academy =

Location
- St Anne's Grove; Fareham, Hampshire, PO14 1JJ; England; 50.850°N 1.159°W

Information
- Type: Academy
- Motto: Unlocking Potential | Creating Opportunity
- Established: 2013
- Local authority: Hampshire
- Department for Education URN: 140069 Tables
- Ofsted: Reports
- Chairman of Board of Governors: Charlie Childs
- Headteacher: Christopher Prankerd
- Staff: circa 100
- Gender: Co-educational
- Age: 11 to 16
- Enrolment: 750
- Average class size: 30
- Website: fareham-academy.hants.sch.uk

Fareham Academy is a medium-sized mixed secondary school, with five tiers of entry (ages 11–16), located in St Anne's Grove in Fareham, England. Along with The Henry Cort Community College and Cams Hill School, it is one of the three main state schools which serve the town of Fareham. The school was called Neville Lovett Learning Community High School until 2013.

Fareham Academy is a Converter Academy, which means that it voluntarily converted in 2013 to allow it to manage its own finances and have more independence in the curriculum that it delivers. In 2016, the Attainment 8 Score for the Academy was 51.7, with a Hampshire average of 51.1 and a National average of 48.5. The Progress 8 score of 0.3 puts the Academy in the top 25% of schools in the country.
