= Thomas Badd =

Sir Thomas Badd, 1st Baronet (c. 1607 – 10 June 1683) was an English Royalist soldier.

Badd was the son of Emmanuel Badd, High Sheriff of Hampshire, who had come to the estate of Cams Hall through his wife, widow of John Ludlow. He was created a baronet, of Cames Oysels in the County of Southampton, on 28 February 1643 in recognition of his services to the Crown in the Civil War and was knighted a few days later on 5 March at Oxford. In December 1647 he was fined £470 for being a Royalist. Sometime before 1658 he married Elizabeth but died without surviving issue on 10 June 1683 aged 76, and was buried at Fareham, Hampshire. The baronetcy died with him.

Baronetage of England
New creation	Baronet (of Cames Oysels); 1643–1683	Extinct
