= Cams Hill School =

Coordinates: 50.850°N 1.159°W

Location
- Shearwater Avenue; Fareham, Hampshire, PO16 8AH; England

Information
- Type: Academy
- Motto: Inspire, Nurture, Achieve, Excel
- Established: 1974 after closure of the Grammar School which previously used the site. https://archivescatalogue.hants.gov.uk/records/A09149/3/3
- Local authority: Hampshire
- Department for Education URN: 137538 Tables
- Ofsted: Reports
- Chairman of Board of Governors: Iain Hare
- Headteacher: Ian Hudson
- Staff: circa 150
- Gender: Co-educational
- Age: 11 to 16
- Enrolment: 1200
- Website: camshill.com

Cams Hill School is a medium-sized co-educational secondary school for ages 11–16, in Shearwater Avenue in Fareham, England. With The Henry Cort Community College and Fareham Academy, it is one of the three main state schools for the town of Fareham, Hampshire.

== History ==
The school attracted national media attention in 2002, when then-headteacher David Wilmot recruited teachers at a nearby Sainsbury's supermarket. He told The Daily Telegraph that he had struggled to recruit and retain newly qualified teachers. The recruitment crisis was highlighted as a "major concern" in an OFSTED report later that year. The school had an OFSTED inspection in 2007 and was reported as a "good school". During an additional inspection in music during October 2008, the school was graded "good" for music provision. Later, in 2011, the school was rated "outstanding" by OFSTED and subsequently converted to an academy. In 2019, the school was rated as "good" overall by OFSTED.

In 2018, a teacher at the school was banned from the profession after sending shirtless photos of himself to a pupil at a different nearby school.
