= Listed buildings in Fareham =

Buildings in Fareham, Hampshire, England

Fareham is a town and non-civil parish in Hampshire, England. It contains 435 listed buildings that are recorded in the National Heritage List for England. Of these four are grade I, 20 are grade II* and 411 are grade II.

This list is based on the information retrieved online from Historic England.

== Key ==
Grade	Criteria
I	Buildings that are of exceptional interest
II*	Particularly important buildings of more than special interest
II	Buildings that are of special interest

== Listing ==
Name	Grade	Location	Type	Completed (Note: The date given is the date used by Historic England as significant for the initial building or that of an important part in the structure's description.)	Date designated	Grid ref. (Note: The grid reference is based on the British national grid reference system, sometimes known as OSGB36, used by the Ordnance Survey.) Geo-coordinates	Notes	Entry number (Note: The "List Entry Number" is a unique number assigned to each listed building and scheduled monument by Historic England.)	Image	Wikidata
Haven Cottage	II	PO14 3JT			17 January 2022	SU5349802393; 50°49′07″N 1°14′31″W		1474328	Upload Photo	Q111853454
Stubbington War Memorial	II	PO14 2LE	war memorial		20 January 2022	SU5545403191; 50°49′32″N 1°12′51″W		1477962	Stubbington War Memorial More images	Q111722575
Burley Cottage	II	19, Anker Lane, Stubbington			18 October 1955	SU5499803674; 50°49′48″N 1°13′14″W		1093539	Upload Photo	Q26385875
Downbarn Cottage	II	Boarhunt Road			22 October 1976	SU5900607279; 50°51′43″N 1°09′47″W		1093542	Upload Photo	Q26385877
Downbarn Farmhouse	II	Boarhunt Road			22 October 1976	SU5917807362; 50°51′46″N 1°09′38″W		1093543	Upload Photo	Q26385878
Rookery Farmhouse	II	149, Botley Road, Swanwick			18 October 1955	SU5147309319; 50°52′52″N 1°16′11″W		1339252	Upload Photo	Q26623517
Yew Tree Villa	II	151, Botley Road, Swanwick			22 October 1976	SU5155209355; 50°52′53″N 1°16′07″W		1339269	Upload Photo	Q26623534
Yew Tree Farmhouse	II	152, Botley Road, Swanwick			22 October 1976	SU5163809322; 50°52′52″N 1°16′02″W		1093544	Upload Photo	Q26385880
159, Botley Road	II	159, Botley Road, Swanwick			22 October 1976	SU5142109467; 50°52′57″N 1°16′14″W		1093502	Upload Photo	Q26385838
Caigers Green	II	Botley Road, Burridge			22 October 1976	SU5183810355; 50°53′25″N 1°15′52″W		1339251	Upload Photo	Q26623516
Granary to East of Rookery Farmhouse	II	Botley Road, Swanwick			22 October 1976	SU5149209320; 50°52′52″N 1°16′10″W		1093501	Upload Photo	Q26385837
Swanwick Barn and Cart Shed About 40 Metres South of Rookery Farmhouse	II	Botley Road			31 July 1995	SU5146009267; 50°52′50″N 1°16′12″W		1365294	Upload Photo	Q26646993
Baptist Chapel	II	Bridge Road, Lower Swanwick	chapel		26 September 2005	SU4957509353; 50°52′54″N 1°17′48″W		1391981	Baptist Chapel More images	Q26671309
Brooklands	II*	Bridge Road, Sarisbury			22 October 1976	SU4964408963; 50°52′41″N 1°17′45″W		1093503	Upload Photo	Q17533682
Garden Cottage	II	Bridge Road, Sarisbury			20 September 1988	SU4968208968; 50°52′41″N 1°17′43″W		1249663	Upload Photo	Q26541773
Ice House Adjoining Garden Cottage	II	Bridge Road, Sarisbury			20 September 1988	SU4969508957; 50°52′41″N 1°17′42″W		1263646	Upload Photo	Q26554424
The Old Ship Inn	II	Bridge Road	pub		26 October 1987	SU4960809332; 50°52′53″N 1°17′46″W		1233866	The Old Ship Inn More images	Q26527305
2-10, Bridge Street	II	2-10, Bridge Street, Titchfield			22 October 1976	SU5401605560; 50°50′49″N 1°14′03″W		1093506	Upload Photo	Q26385841
3, Bridge Street	II	3, Bridge Street, Titchfield			22 October 1976	SU5398505558; 50°50′49″N 1°14′04″W		1093504	Upload Photo	Q26385839
12 and 14, Bridge Street	II	12 and 14, Bridge Street, Titchfield			22 October 1976	SU5403105534; 50°50′49″N 1°14′02″W		1093507	Upload Photo	Q26385842
Barn to South East of No 3	II	Bridge Street, Titchfield			22 October 1976	SU5398705543; 50°50′49″N 1°14′04″W		1093505	Upload Photo	Q26385840
Great Brook	II	69, Brook Lane, Warsash			18 October 1955	SU4953706782; 50°51′30″N 1°17′51″W		1093508	Upload Photo	Q26385843
Former Barn to North East of No 69 (great Brook)	II	Brook Lane, Warsash			22 October 1976	SU4956706789; 50°51′31″N 1°17′50″W		1093509	Upload Photo	Q26385844
Former Barn to South of No 69 (great Brook)	II	Brook Lane, Warsash			22 October 1976	SU4951706753; 50°51′29″N 1°17′52″W		1093510	Upload Photo	Q26385845
Granary to South East of No 69 (great Brook)	II	Brook Lane, Warsash			22 October 1976	SU4953206744; 50°51′29″N 1°17′52″W		1339270	Upload Photo	Q26623535
Little Brook	II	Brook Lane, Warsash			22 October 1976	SU4971706979; 50°51′37″N 1°17′42″W		1229113	Upload Photo	Q26522895
Outbuilding Attached to North West End of South Barn at No 69 (great Barn)	II	Brook Lane, Warsash			22 October 1976	SU4950906766; 50°51′30″N 1°17′53″W		1093511	Upload Photo	Q26385846
Barn to South West of Brownwich Farmhouse	II	Brownwich Lane, Titchfield			22 October 1976	SU5194803644; 50°49′48″N 1°15′50″W		1229120	Upload Photo	Q26522901
Brownwich Farmhouse	II	Brownwich Lane, Titchfield			22 October 1976	SU5202303667; 50°49′49″N 1°15′46″W		1093512	Upload Photo	Q26385847
Rose Cottage	II	Brune Lane, Chark Common			22 October 1976	SU5752201938; 50°48′51″N 1°11′06″W		1339271	Upload Photo	Q26623536
1-5, Burnt House Lane	II	1-5, Burnt House Lane, Stubbington			22 October 1976	SU5556303364; 50°49′38″N 1°12′45″W		1093513	Upload Photo	Q26385848
Burridge Farmhouse	II	Burridge Road, Burridge			22 October 1976	SU5129710801; 50°53′40″N 1°16′19″W		1339272	Upload Photo	Q26623537
8 and 9, Cams Hill	II	8 and 9, Cams Hill			22 October 1976	SU5886506242; 50°51′10″N 1°09′54″W		1279200	Upload Photo	Q26568438
Down End Cottages	II	Cams Hill			22 October 1976	SU5899006205; 50°51′09″N 1°09′48″W		1093514	Upload Photo	Q26385849
Noel Cottage	II	35, Castle Street, Portchester			22 October 1976	SU6187605348; 50°50′40″N 1°07′21″W		1279167	Upload Photo	Q26568407
White Lodge	II	53, Castle Street, Portchester			22 October 1976	SU6188605247; 50°50′36″N 1°07′21″W		1093516	Upload Photo	Q26385851
67-73, Castle Street	II	67-73, Castle Street, Portchester			22 October 1976	SU6196805157; 50°50′33″N 1°07′16″W		1339237	Upload Photo	Q26623502
Reef Cottage	II	81, Castle Street, Portchester			22 October 1976	SU6198905117; 50°50′32″N 1°07′15″W		1229293	Upload Photo	Q26523064
The White House	II	88, Castle Street, Portchester			22 October 1976	SU6197405196; 50°50′35″N 1°07′16″W		1094316	Upload Photo	Q26386648
94, Castle Street	II	94, Castle Street, Portchester			22 October 1976	SU6199105170; 50°50′34″N 1°07′15″W		1351253	Upload Photo	Q26634372
Golden Cot	II	98, Castle Street, Portchester			22 October 1976	SU6199605161; 50°50′34″N 1°07′15″W		1094317	Upload Photo	Q26386649
The Retreat	II	100, Castle Street, Portchester			19 August 1975	SU6200905129; 50°50′33″N 1°07′14″W		1351254	Upload Photo	Q26634373
Hythe Cottage	II	118, Castle Street, Portchester			22 October 1976	SU6206905022; 50°50′29″N 1°07′11″W		1229412	Upload Photo	Q26523170
129, Castle Street	II	129, Castle Street, Portchester			22 October 1976	SU6208704925; 50°50′26″N 1°07′11″W		1093517	Upload Photo	Q26385852
131 and 133, Castle Street	II	131 and 133, Castle Street, Portchester			22 October 1976	SU6209404921; 50°50′26″N 1°07′10″W		1093518	Upload Photo	Q26385853
Little Willow	II	135, Castle Street, Portchester			22 October 1976	SU6210104916; 50°50′26″N 1°07′10″W		1279132	Upload Photo	Q26568378
Walnut Cottage	II	140, Castle Street, Portchester			22 October 1976	SU6210904939; 50°50′26″N 1°07′09″W		1094318	Upload Photo	Q26386650
Vine Cottage	II	153, Castle Street, Portchester			22 October 1976	SU6215604857; 50°50′24″N 1°07′07″W		1339238	Upload Photo	Q26623503
155, Castle Street	II	155, Castle Street, Portchester			22 October 1976	SU6216204849; 50°50′23″N 1°07′07″W		1093519	Upload Photo	Q26385854
158, Castle Street	II	158, Castle Street, Portchester			22 October 1976	SU6216704889; 50°50′25″N 1°07′06″W		1094319	Upload Photo	Q26386651
Pylewell House	II	166, Castle Street, Portchester			22 October 1976	SU6221804822; 50°50′23″N 1°07′04″W		1351255	Upload Photo	Q26634374
168, Castle Street	II	168, Castle Street, Portchester			22 October 1976	SU6222704819; 50°50′22″N 1°07′03″W		1229438	Upload Photo	Q26523196
St Vincent St Vincent Cottage	II	171, Castle Street, Portchester			18 October 1955	SU6220704792; 50°50′22″N 1°07′04″W		1229310	Upload Photo	Q26523080
Dovercroft	II	172, Castle Street, Portchester			22 October 1976	SU6222504809; 50°50′22″N 1°07′04″W		1094320	Upload Photo	Q26386652
Thatched Cottage	II	173, Castle Street, Portchester			18 October 1955	SU6222504764; 50°50′21″N 1°07′04″W		1093521	Upload Photo	Q26385856
Wisteria Cottage	II	174, Castle Street, Portchester			22 October 1976	SU6222904802; 50°50′22″N 1°07′03″W		1351256	Upload Photo	Q26634375
Myrtle Cottage	II	182, Castle Street, Portchester			22 October 1976	SU6224804778; 50°50′21″N 1°07′02″W		1094321	Upload Photo	Q26386653
Oriel Cottage	II	184, Castle Street, Portchester			22 October 1976	SU6225104768; 50°50′21″N 1°07′02″W		1094322	Upload Photo	Q26386654
St Ambrose	II	185, Castle Street, Portchester			22 October 1976	SU6224804717; 50°50′19″N 1°07′02″W		1339240	Upload Photo	Q26623505
Lyme Cottage	II	186, Castle Street, Portchester			22 October 1976	SU6225404764; 50°50′21″N 1°07′02″W		1279090	Upload Photo	Q26568343
Bowery Cottage	II	188, Castle Street, Portchester			22 October 1976	SU6225804757; 50°50′20″N 1°07′02″W		1094323	Upload Photo	Q26386655
189, Castle Street	II	189, Castle Street, Portchester			22 October 1976	SU6225104708; 50°50′19″N 1°07′02″W		1229355	Upload Photo	Q26523124
190, Castle Street	II	190, Castle Street, Portchester	building		22 October 1976	SU6226304750; 50°50′20″N 1°07′02″W		1229466	190, Castle Street More images	Q26523224
Narborough House	II	193, Castle Street, Portchester			18 October 1955	SU6225804693; 50°50′18″N 1°07′02″W		1093522	Upload Photo	Q26385857
195, Castle Street (see Details for Further Address Information)	II	195, Castle Street, Portchester			18 October 1955	SU6226004683; 50°50′18″N 1°07′02″W		1094311	Upload Photo	Q26386642
197, Castle Street	II	197, Castle Street, Portchester			22 October 1976	SU6226104676; 50°50′18″N 1°07′02″W		1351249	Upload Photo	Q26634368
199, Castle Street	II	199, Castle Street, Portchester			22 October 1976	SU6222804654; 50°50′17″N 1°07′03″W		1094312	Upload Photo	Q26386643
The Old Bakehouse	II	200, Castle Street, Portchester			22 October 1976	SU6227704727; 50°50′19″N 1°07′01″W		1094324	Upload Photo	Q26386656
Churchill Cottage	II	201, Castle Street, Portchester			22 October 1976	SU6228104637; 50°50′17″N 1°07′01″W		1351250	Upload Photo	Q26634369
Duckett House Rosemary	II	202, Castle Street, Portchester			18 October 1955	SU6228204718; 50°50′19″N 1°07′01″W		1094325	Upload Photo	Q26386657
Crown House	II	209, Castle Street, Portchester			18 October 1955	SU6229304669; 50°50′18″N 1°07′00″W		1094313	Upload Photo	Q26386644
211, Castle Street	II	211, Castle Street, Portchester			22 October 1976	SU6230004665; 50°50′17″N 1°07′00″W		1351251	Upload Photo	Q26634370
Hope Cottage	II	213, Castle Street, Portchester			22 October 1976	SU6231104658; 50°50′17″N 1°06′59″W		1094314	Upload Photo	Q26386646
Pendeen Cottage Rover Cottage	II	217, Castle Street, Portchester			22 October 1976	SU6231704653; 50°50′17″N 1°06′59″W		1094315	Upload Photo	Q26386647
Castle Cottage	II	219, Castle Street, Portchester			22 October 1976	SU6231804645; 50°50′17″N 1°06′59″W		1351252	Upload Photo	Q26634371
164a and 164b, Castle Street	II	164a and 164b, Castle Street, Portchester			22 October 1976	SU6220504840; 50°50′23″N 1°07′05″W		1229423	Upload Photo	Q26523180
Church of St Mary	I	Castle Street, Portchester	church building		18 October 1955	SU6253004495; 50°50′12″N 1°06′48″W		1339235	Church of St Mary More images	Q17528347
Churchyard Wall at St Mary's Churchyard	II	Castle Street, Portchester			22 October 1976	SU6251404546; 50°50′13″N 1°06′49″W		1229289	Upload Photo	Q26523061
Former Barn to South of No 157	II	Castle Street, Portchester			22 October 1976	SU6217904836; 50°50′23″N 1°07′06″W		1339239	Upload Photo	Q26623504
Gate and Railings to East of No 169 (st Vincent)	II	Castle Street, Portchester			22 October 1976	SU6220904804; 50°50′22″N 1°07′04″W		1093520	Upload Photo	Q26385855
Lamp in St Mary's Churchyard	II	Castle Street, Portchester			22 October 1976	SU6250904523; 50°50′13″N 1°06′49″W		1339236	Upload Photo	Q26623501
Lychgate at Entrance to St Mary's Churchyard	II	Castle Street, Portchester	lychgate		22 October 1976	SU6249904547; 50°50′14″N 1°06′50″W		1093515	Lychgate at Entrance to St Mary's Churchyard More images	Q26385850
Portchester Castle	I	Castle Street, Portchester	castle		18 October 1955	SU6241104667; 50°50′17″N 1°06′54″W		1229190	Portchester Castle More images	Q732249
Street Boundary Wall to North West of No 153 (vine Cottage)	II	Castle Street, Portchester			22 October 1976	SU6215404867; 50°50′24″N 1°07′07″W		1229309	Upload Photo	Q26523079
Street Boundary Wall to South East of No 171 (st Vincent Cottage)	II	Castle Street, Portchester			22 October 1976	SU6222204785; 50°50′21″N 1°07′04″W		1229347	Upload Photo	Q26523116
Street Boundary Wall to South East of No 174 (wisteria Cottage)	II	Castle Street, Portchester			22 October 1976	SU6223504784; 50°50′21″N 1°07′03″W		1229446	Upload Photo	Q26523205
1-5, Catisfield Lane	II	1-5, Catisfield Lane, Catisfield			22 October 1976	SU5472606238; 50°51′11″N 1°13′26″W		1094326	Upload Photo	Q26386658
Catisfield Cottage	II	Catisfield Lane, Catisfield			18 October 1955	SU5491006245; 50°51′11″N 1°13′17″W		1229534	Upload Photo	Q26523286
Meoncross Boys School	II	Catisfield Lane, Catisfield	school building		22 October 1976	SU5472306171; 50°51′09″N 1°13′26″W		1229550	Meoncross Boys School More images	Q26523302
Front Garden Wall at Manor Cottage	II	Church Path			22 October 1976	SU5810606487; 50°51′18″N 1°10′33″W		1229566	Upload Photo	Q26523318
Gate Piers and Front Garden Wall at Manor Croft	II	Church Path			22 October 1976	SU5812006446; 50°51′17″N 1°10′32″W		1351258	Upload Photo	Q26634377
Gate Piers and Front Garden Wall at Manor House	II	Church Path			22 October 1976	SU5811106472; 50°51′17″N 1°10′33″W		1351257	Upload Photo	Q26634376
Gate Piers and Front Garden Wall at Manor Lodge	II	Church Path			22 October 1976	SU5811606457; 50°51′17″N 1°10′33″W		1094330	Upload Photo	Q26386662
Manor Cottage	II	Church Path			22 October 1976	SU5812106487; 50°51′18″N 1°10′32″W		1094328	Upload Photo	Q26386660
Manor Croft	II	Church Path			22 October 1976	SU5813306448; 50°51′17″N 1°10′32″W		1278957	Upload Photo	Q26568218
Manor House	II	Church Path			22 October 1976	SU5812506473; 50°51′17″N 1°10′32″W		1094329	Upload Photo	Q26386661
Manor Lodge	II	Church Path			22 October 1976	SU5813106459; 50°51′17″N 1°10′32″W		1229656	Upload Photo	Q26523405
1, Church Place	II	1, Church Place			22 October 1976	SU5822106546; 50°51′20″N 1°10′27″W		1094331	Upload Photo	Q26386663
North and West Boundary Walls, Altar Tombs and Memorials in the Churchyard of the Parish Church of St Peter and St Paul	II	Church Place			22 October 1976	SU5809506521; 50°51′19″N 1°10′34″W		1278934	Upload Photo	Q26568196
2, Church Place	II	2, Church Place			22 October 1976	SU5821606542; 50°51′20″N 1°10′28″W		1229693	Upload Photo	Q26523439
Parish Church of St Peter	I	Church Place, Titchfield	church building		18 October 1955	SU5409305785; 50°50′57″N 1°13′59″W		1351279	Parish Church of St Peter More images	Q17528350
Parish Church of St Peter and St Paul	II*	Church Place	church building		18 October 1955	SU5817506502; 50°51′18″N 1°10′30″W		1094332	Parish Church of St Peter and St Paul More images	Q17533751
Schoolhouse	II	130, Church Road			19 April 1989	SU4993105492; 50°50′48″N 1°17′32″W		1233888	Upload Photo	Q26527324
Church of St Mary	II	Church Road	church building		19 April 1989	SU5000805551; 50°50′50″N 1°17′28″W		1233890	Church of St Mary More images	Q26527327
Hook with Warsash Infants School	II	Church Road			19 April 1989	SU4992605511; 50°50′49″N 1°17′32″W		1276405	Upload Photo	Q26565921
Lychgate to Church of St Mary	II	Church Road			19 April 1989	SU4997505535; 50°50′50″N 1°17′29″W		1276379	Upload Photo	Q26565895
Low Boundary Walls, Memorials, Table Tombs in the Churchyard of St Peters Parish Church (the Old Churchyard West of Church Path to Castle Street Footpath)	II	Church Street, Titchfield			22 October 1976	SU5406505786; 50°50′57″N 1°14′00″W		1094291	Upload Photo	Q26386620
2 and 4, Church Street	II	2 and 4, Church Street, Titchfield			22 October 1976	SU5402205796; 50°50′57″N 1°14′02″W		1351280	Upload Photo	Q26634397
5, Church Street	II	5, Church Street, Titchfield			18 October 1955	SU5401605780; 50°50′56″N 1°14′03″W		1351259	Upload Photo	Q26634378
7, Church Street	II	7, Church Street, Titchfield			18 October 1955	SU5402505783; 50°50′57″N 1°14′02″W		1094333	Upload Photo	Q26386664
9, Church Street	II	9, Church Street, Titchfield			18 October 1955	SU5403005783; 50°50′57″N 1°14′02″W		1351278	Upload Photo	Q26634396
10-14, Church Street	II	10-14, Church Street, Titchfield			22 October 1976	SU5405905799; 50°50′57″N 1°14′00″W		1094292	Upload Photo	Q26386621
11, Church Street	II	11, Church Street, Titchfield			18 October 1955	SU5403705784; 50°50′57″N 1°14′02″W		1094289	Upload Photo	Q26386617
The Vicarage	II	Church Street, Titchfield			22 October 1976	SU5406305749; 50°50′55″N 1°14′00″W		1094290	Upload Photo	Q26386618
Belvedere	II	1, Coach Hill, Titchfield			22 October 1976	SU5393705560; 50°50′49″N 1°14′07″W		1094294	Upload Photo	Q26386623
2, Coach Hill	II	2, Coach Hill, Titchfield			22 October 1976	SU5397205561; 50°50′49″N 1°14′05″W		1351281	Upload Photo	Q26634398
Surgery	II	6, Coach Hill, Titchfield			22 October 1976	SU5395005549; 50°50′49″N 1°14′06″W		1094293	Upload Photo	Q26386622
7, Coach Hill	II	7, Coach Hill, Titvhfield			22 October 1976	SU5387605592; 50°50′50″N 1°14′10″W		1351282	Upload Photo	Q26634399
Brick Kiln, Chimney, Drying Sheds, Boiler and Engine House at Bursledon Brickworks South Section	II*	Coal Park Lane, Lower Swanwick			30 January 1981	SU5000409819; 50°53′09″N 1°17′26″W		1233725	Upload Photo	Q17533844
Crabthorn Farm Cottage Crabthorn Farmhouse	II	Crabthorn Farm Lane, Hill Head			18 October 1955	SU5458102959; 50°49′25″N 1°13′35″W		1094295	Upload Photo	Q26386624
Smugglers Cottage	II	49, Crofton Lane, Hill Head			22 October 1976	SU5466102391; 50°49′07″N 1°13′32″W		1351283	Upload Photo	Q26634400
Crofton Farmhouse	II	50, Crofton Lane, Hill Head			22 October 1976	SU5485802566; 50°49′12″N 1°13′21″W		1229781	Upload Photo	Q26523524
Cuckoo Cottage	II	27, Cuckoo Lane, Stubbington			18 October 1955	SU5491703009; 50°49′26″N 1°13′18″W		1094296	Upload Photo	Q26386625
Old Street Farmhouse	II	Cutlers Lane, Stubbington			22 October 1976	SU5509403428; 50°49′40″N 1°13′09″W		1094297	Upload Photo	Q26386626
The Thatched Cottage	II	57, Dibles Road, Warsash			22 October 1976	SU5003506114; 50°51′09″N 1°17′26″W		1278930	Upload Photo	Q26568192
Toby Cottage	II	17, Drift Road, Wallington			22 October 1976	SU5851806859; 50°51′30″N 1°10′12″W		1351244	Upload Photo	Q26634363
East Hill	II	Drift Road, Wallington			22 October 1976	SU5872606691; 50°51′24″N 1°10′01″W		1094298	Upload Photo	Q26386627
1, East Street	II	1, East Street			22 October 1976	SU5826506189; 50°51′08″N 1°10′25″W		1278895	Upload Photo	Q26568160
2, East Street	II	2, East Street, Titchfield			22 October 1976	SU5413305933; 50°51′01″N 1°13′57″W		1278847	Upload Photo	Q26568119
3 and 5, East Street	II	3 and 5, East Street, Titchfield	building		22 October 1976	SU5410405961; 50°51′02″N 1°13′58″W		1278908	3 and 5, East Street More images	Q26568172
3-7, East Street	II	3-7, East Street			22 October 1976	SU5828806191; 50°51′08″N 1°10′24″W		1351245	Upload Photo	Q26634364
6 and 8, East Street	II	6 and 8, East Street, Titchfield			22 October 1976	SU5409405943; 50°51′02″N 1°13′59″W		1094307	Upload Photo	Q26386637
7-13, East Street	II	7-13, East Street, Titchfield			22 October 1976	SU5409405962; 50°51′02″N 1°13′59″W		1094303	Upload Photo	Q26386633
9-13, East Street	II	9-13, East Street			22 October 1976	SU5831506199; 50°51′09″N 1°10′23″W		1278901	Upload Photo	Q26568165
Courts Warehouse	II	10, East Street			22 October 1976	SU5825706167; 50°51′08″N 1°10′26″W		1229803	Upload Photo	Q26523546
Burpham House	II	12, East Street			22 October 1976	SU5827606167; 50°51′08″N 1°10′25″W		1094301	Upload Photo	Q26386630
15 and 17, East Street	II	15 and 17, East Street, Titchfield	building		22 October 1976	SU5408205963; 50°51′02″N 1°13′59″W		1278877	15 and 17, East Street More images	Q26568142
19 and 21, East Street	II	19 and 21, East Street, Titchfield	building		22 October 1976	SU5407305964; 50°51′02″N 1°14′00″W		1094304	19 and 21, East Street More images	Q26386634
23 and 25, East Street	II	23 and 25, East Street, Titchfield			22 October 1976	SU5406005966; 50°51′02″N 1°14′00″W		1094305	Upload Photo	Q26386635
Eastleigh House	II	27, East Street, Titchfield	house		22 October 1976	SU5404705969; 50°51′03″N 1°14′01″W		1278871	Eastleigh House More images	Q26568140
Kings Row	II	29-39, East Street, Titchfield			22 October 1976	SU5401905971; 50°51′03″N 1°14′02″W		1094306	Upload Photo	Q26386636
Fareham House	II	East Street			22 October 1976	SU5834406213; 50°51′09″N 1°10′21″W		1094299	Upload Photo	Q26386628
Murrills	II	East Street, Portchester			18 October 1955	SU6210905692; 50°50′51″N 1°07′09″W		1094302	Upload Photo	Q26386632
Old Clarendon House	II	East Street, Titchfield			18 October 1955	SU5397405977; 50°51′03″N 1°14′05″W		1351246	Upload Photo	Q26634365
Rockstone House	II	East Street, Titchfield			18 October 1955	SU5399205955; 50°51′02″N 1°14′04″W		1229964	Upload Photo	Q26523685
The Red Lion Hotel	II	East Street	hotel		18 October 1955	SU5823106169; 50°51′08″N 1°10′27″W		1094300	The Red Lion Hotel More images	Q26386629
Huntsmans Cottage and 2 Adjoining Cottages	II	Fishers Hill, Cartisfield			22 October 1976	SU5465806467; 50°51′19″N 1°13′29″W		1351247	Upload Photo	Q26634366
Post Office	II	Fishers Hill, Catisfield	post office		22 October 1976	SU5472506268; 50°51′12″N 1°13′26″W		1094308	Post Office More images	Q26386638
Stony Bridge	II	Fishers Hill, Titchfield	road bridge		22 October 1976	SU5436606603; 50°51′23″N 1°13′44″W		1229990	Stony Bridge More images	Q17677256
Jolly Farmer Public House	II	Fleet End Road, Warsash			22 October 1976	SU5093006271; 50°51′13″N 1°16′40″W		1094309	Upload Photo	Q26386639
House at Saw Mills (pink and Company Limited)	II	Forest Lane			22 October 1976	SU5780409629; 50°53′00″N 1°10′47″W		1230002	Upload Photo	Q26523718
Mission Room with Cottage Adjoining	II	Forest Lane	cottage		22 October 1976	SU5819610223; 50°53′19″N 1°10′26″W		1351248	Mission Room with Cottage Adjoining More images	Q26634367
Church of St Francis	II	Funtley Hill, Funtley	church building		22 October 1976	SU5649408005; 50°52′08″N 1°11′55″W		1094310	Church of St Francis More images	Q26386640
Glen House	II	Glen Road, Sarisbury			22 October 1976	SU5057809432; 50°52′56″N 1°16′57″W		1278808	Upload Photo	Q26568088
Littlecroft	II	22, Gosport Road, Stubbington			22 October 1976	SU5577002788; 50°49′19″N 1°12′35″W		1094267	Upload Photo	Q26386597
Brook House	II	99, Gosport Road			22 October 1976	SU5769805672; 50°50′52″N 1°10′54″W		1094266	Upload Photo	Q26386596
Holy Rood Church	II	Gosport Road, Stubbington	church building		22 October 1976	SU5560503051; 50°49′28″N 1°12′43″W		1351268	Holy Rood Church More images	Q26634387
Yew Tree Cottage	II	Havelock Road, Warsash			22 October 1976	SU4920506113; 50°51′09″N 1°18′09″W		1351269	Upload Photo	Q26634388
1, High Street	II	1, High Street			22 October 1976	SU5820806201; 50°51′09″N 1°10′28″W		1094268	Upload Photo	Q26386598
2, High Street	II	2, High Street			22 October 1976	SU5821206215; 50°51′09″N 1°10′28″W		1094269	Upload Photo	Q26386599
3 and 3a, High Street	II	3 and 3a, High Street			22 October 1976	SU5821606225; 50°51′09″N 1°10′28″W		1094270	Upload Photo	Q26386600
4 and 5, High Street	II	4 and 5, High Street			22 October 1976	SU5821806234; 50°51′10″N 1°10′28″W		1351271	Upload Photo	Q26634390
4 and 6, High Street	II	4 and 6, High Street, Titchfield	building		22 October 1976	SU5397405932; 50°51′01″N 1°14′05″W		1351264	4 and 6, High Street More images	Q26634383
5 and 7, High Street	II	5 and 7, High Street, Titchfield			11 September 1974	SU5396005965; 50°51′02″N 1°14′05″W		1230514	Upload Photo	Q26524188
6, High Street	II	6, High Street			22 October 1976	SU5822406246; 50°51′10″N 1°10′27″W		1094271	Upload Photo	Q26386601
7, High Street	II*	7, High Street	building		18 October 1955	SU5822606261; 50°51′11″N 1°10′27″W		1094272	7, High Street More images	Q17533728
8 and 8a, High Street	II	8 and 8a, High Street			22 October 1976	SU5822906276; 50°51′11″N 1°10′27″W		1351272	Upload Photo	Q26634391
8, High Street	II	8, High Street, Titchfield			18 October 1955	SU5397905918; 50°51′01″N 1°14′05″W		1094256	Upload Photo	Q26386585
Kames Cottage	II	9 and 11, High Street, Titchfield			11 September 1974	SU5395905955; 50°51′02″N 1°14′06″W		1338899	Upload Photo	Q26623184
10 and 11, High Street	II	10 and 11, High Street			22 October 1976	SU5823506295; 50°51′12″N 1°10′27″W		1230164	Upload Photo	Q26523866
10-16, High Street	II	10-16, High Street, Titchfield			22 October 1976	SU5398305897; 50°51′00″N 1°14′04″W		1230540	Upload Photo	Q26524213
12, High Street	II*	12, High Street	house		18 October 1955	SU5823706309; 50°51′12″N 1°10′27″W		1094273	12, High Street More images	Q17533739
13-16 High Street	II*	13-16, High Street			18 October 1955	SU5824106325; 50°51′13″N 1°10′26″W		1351273	Upload Photo	Q17533902
The Queens Head Hotel	II	13, High Street, Titchfield	hotel		18 October 1955	SU5395805897; 50°51′00″N 1°14′06″W		1230518	The Queens Head Hotel More images	Q26524192
15-19, High Street	II	15-19, High Street, Titchfield			22 October 1976	SU5396505883; 50°51′00″N 1°14′05″W		1094254	Upload Photo	Q26386583
17 High Street	II	17, High Street			18 October 1955	SU5824406337; 50°51′13″N 1°10′26″W		1141166	Upload Photo	Q26433926
18, High Street	II	18, High Street			18 October 1955	SU5824506351; 50°51′14″N 1°10′26″W		1094274	Upload Photo	Q26386602
19, High Street	II	19, High Street			18 October 1955	SU5824706367; 50°51′14″N 1°10′26″W		1094275	Upload Photo	Q26386603
20, High Street	II	20, High Street			18 October 1955	SU5824906378; 50°51′14″N 1°10′26″W		1230184	Upload Photo	Q26523886
20-24, High Street	II	20-24, High Street, Titchfield			22 October 1976	SU5400005863; 50°50′59″N 1°14′03″W		1094257	Upload Photo	Q26386586
21, High Street	II	21, High Street			18 October 1955	SU5824906385; 50°51′15″N 1°10′26″W		1351274	Upload Photo	Q26634392
Lothian House	II	22, High Street			18 October 1955	SU5825006398; 50°51′15″N 1°10′26″W		1094276	Upload Photo	Q26386604
23-25, High Street	II	23-25, High Street			18 October 1955	SU5825306418; 50°51′16″N 1°10′26″W		1351275	Upload Photo	Q26634393
26 and 27, High Street	II	26 and 27, High Street			22 October 1976	SU5825506426; 50°51′16″N 1°10′26″W		1278692	Upload Photo	Q26567994
Sydney House	II	26, High Street, Titchfield			22 October 1976	SU5400505853; 50°50′59″N 1°14′03″W		1351265	Upload Photo	Q26634384
28-34, High Street	II	28-34, High Street, Titchfield			22 October 1976	SU5400905838; 50°50′58″N 1°14′03″W		1230545	Upload Photo	Q26524217
The Golden Lion Public House	II	28, High Street	pub		22 October 1976	SU5825406434; 50°51′16″N 1°10′26″W		1094277	The Golden Lion Public House More images	Q26386605
29, High Street	II	29, High Street, Titchfield			22 October 1976	SU5397105852; 50°50′59″N 1°14′05″W		1338900	Upload Photo	Q26623185
31, High Street	II	31, High Street, Titchfield			22 October 1976	SU5397305843; 50°50′59″N 1°14′05″W		1230526	Upload Photo	Q26524201
33, High Street	II	33, High Street, Titchfield			18 October 1955	SU5397605830; 50°50′58″N 1°14′05″W		1094255	Upload Photo	Q26386584
33, High Street	II	33, High Street			18 October 1955	SU5824306512; 50°51′19″N 1°10′26″W		1278676	Upload Photo	Q26567980
34-36, High Street	II	34-36, High Street			22 October 1976	SU5824106522; 50°51′19″N 1°10′26″W		1094279	Upload Photo	Q26386607
35, High Street	II	35, High Street, Titchfield			22 October 1976	SU5397805821; 50°50′58″N 1°14′05″W		1230530	Upload Photo	Q26524204
Numbers 36 and 38 (at Rear of Number 34)	II	36 and 38, High Street, Titchfield			22 October 1976	SU5403005831; 50°50′58″N 1°14′02″W		1094258	Upload Photo	Q26386587
The Old Vicarage	II	46, High Street			18 October 1955	SU5825406539; 50°51′20″N 1°10′26″W		1094280	Upload Photo	Q26386608
Vicar's Hill	II	47, High Street			22 October 1976	SU5826106529; 50°51′19″N 1°10′25″W		1094281	Upload Photo	Q26386609
48, High Street	II	48, High Street			22 October 1976	SU5826306520; 50°51′19″N 1°10′25″W		1230329	Upload Photo	Q26524011
49 and 50, High Street	II	49 and 50, High Street			18 October 1955	SU5826606506; 50°51′19″N 1°10′25″W		1094282	Upload Photo	Q26386610
Lysses	II	51, High Street			18 October 1955	SU5828306479; 50°51′18″N 1°10′24″W		1230340	Upload Photo	Q26524022
52 and 53, High Street	II	52 and 53, High Street			22 October 1976	SU5827906453; 50°51′17″N 1°10′24″W		1094284	Upload Photo	Q26386612
55 and 56, High Street	II	55 and 56, High Street			22 October 1976	SU5828206438; 50°51′16″N 1°10′24″W		1094285	Upload Photo	Q26386613
Roseneath	II*	57, High Street	building		18 October 1955	SU5828306424; 50°51′16″N 1°10′24″W		1230370	Roseneath More images	Q17533763
58-60, High Street	II	58-60, High Street			18 October 1955	SU5828006409; 50°51′15″N 1°10′24″W		1094286	Upload Photo	Q26386614
61 and 62, High Street	II	61 and 62, High Street			18 October 1955	SU5828006395; 50°51′15″N 1°10′24″W		1094287	Upload Photo	Q26386615
63, High Street	II	63, High Street			22 October 1976	SU5828306382; 50°51′14″N 1°10′24″W		1278627	Upload Photo	Q26567934
64, High Street	II	64, High Street			18 October 1955	SU5828206368; 50°51′14″N 1°10′24″W		1351277	Upload Photo	Q26634395
67, High Street	II	67, High Street			18 October 1955	SU5827806335; 50°51′13″N 1°10′24″W		1230398	Upload Photo	Q26524079
Fareham and County Club	II*	68, High Street			18 October 1955	SU5827706324; 50°51′13″N 1°10′25″W		1094245	Upload Photo	Q17533704
69, High Street	II*	69, High Street	building		18 October 1955	SU5827206306; 50°51′12″N 1°10′25″W		1094246	69, High Street More images	Q17533716
Kintyre House	II*	70, High Street	house		18 October 1955	SU5826806273; 50°51′11″N 1°10′25″W		1338894	Kintyre House More images	Q17533891
71, High Street	II	71, High Street			22 October 1976	SU5826306262; 50°51′11″N 1°10′25″W		1094248	Upload Photo	Q26386577
72-74, High Street	II	72-74, High Street			22 October 1976	SU5826006252; 50°51′10″N 1°10′25″W		1094249	Upload Photo	Q26386578
Number 75 Including Rear Wing	II	75, High Street			22 October 1976	SU5826106241; 50°51′10″N 1°10′25″W		1338895	Upload Photo	Q26623180
76, High Street	II	76, High Street			22 October 1976	SU5824506236; 50°51′10″N 1°10′26″W		1338896	Upload Photo	Q26623181
78, High Street	II	78, High Street			22 October 1976	SU5824106209; 50°51′09″N 1°10′26″W		1094251	Upload Photo	Q26386580
79, High Street	II	79, High Street			22 October 1976	SU5823706197; 50°51′09″N 1°10′27″W		1338898	Upload Photo	Q26623183
77a, High Street (see Details for Further Address Information)	II	77a, High Street			22 October 1976	SU5824206225; 50°51′09″N 1°10′26″W		1094250	Upload Photo	Q26386579
Former Stables at Kintyre House	II	High Street			18 October 1955	SU5826606290; 50°51′12″N 1°10′25″W		1338893	Upload Photo	Q26623179
K6 Telephone Kiosk at Junction with Southampton Hill	II	High Street			28 February 1989	SU5395905950; 50°51′02″N 1°14′06″W		1233873	Upload Photo	Q26527312
Old Lodge Cottage	II	High Street, Titchfield			18 October 1955	SU5396405973; 50°51′03″N 1°14′05″W		1094252	Upload Photo	Q26386581
Old Sweetshop Cottage	II	30a, High Street			22 October 1976	SU5824506502; 50°51′18″N 1°10′26″W		1094278	Upload Photo	Q26386606
Outbuilding Behind the Bugle Hotel	II	High Street, Titchfield	outbuilding		22 October 1976	SU5405105815; 50°50′58″N 1°14′01″W		1094259	Outbuilding Behind the Bugle Hotel More images	Q26386588
Street Lamp Just to South of Number 29	II	High Street			22 October 1976	SU5825306485; 50°51′18″N 1°10′26″W		1094283	Upload Photo	Q26386611
Street Lamp Outside No 21	II	High Street			22 October 1976	SU5825906385; 50°51′15″N 1°10′25″W		1230199	Upload Photo	Q26523900
Street Lamp Outside Number 13	II	High Street			22 October 1976	SU5824906318; 50°51′12″N 1°10′26″W		1230181	Upload Photo	Q26523883
Street Lamp Outside Number 2	II	High Street			22 October 1976	SU5821906212; 50°51′09″N 1°10′28″W		1351270	Upload Photo	Q26634389
Street Lamp Outside Number 44	II	High Street			22 October 1976	SU5823406565; 50°51′20″N 1°10′27″W		1230327	Upload Photo	Q26524009
Street Lamp Outside Number 57	II	High Street			22 October 1976	SU5827306419; 50°51′16″N 1°10′25″W		1351276	Upload Photo	Q26634394
Street Lamp Outside Number 70	II	High Street			22 October 1976	SU5825906281; 50°51′11″N 1°10′25″W		1094247	Upload Photo	Q26386576
Street Lamp Outside Numbers 65 and 66	II	High Street			22 October 1976	SU5827006353; 50°51′14″N 1°10′25″W		1094288	Upload Photo	Q26386616
Street Lamp in Front of Number 52	II	High Street			22 October 1976	SU5827006458; 50°51′17″N 1°10′25″W		1230360	Upload Photo	Q26524041
Street Lamp to North of Number 76	II	High Street			22 October 1976	SU5824406245; 50°51′10″N 1°10′26″W		1338897	Upload Photo	Q26623182
The Bugle Hotel	II	High Street, Titchfield	hotel		18 October 1955	SU5401705814; 50°50′58″N 1°14′03″W		1230565	The Bugle Hotel More images	Q26524237
The Old Lodge	II	High Street, Titchfield			18 October 1955	SU5396406010; 50°51′04″N 1°14′05″W		1230504	Upload Photo	Q26524179
War Memorial	II	High Street, Titchfield	war memorial		22 October 1976	SU5395305919; 50°51′01″N 1°14′06″W		1094253	War Memorial More images	Q26386582
Little Chilling (2 Cottages)	II	Hook, Chilling			22 October 1976	SU5104604405; 50°50′13″N 1°16′35″W		1094327	Upload Photo	Q26386659
Nook Cottages	II	1-4, Hook Lane, Hook	cottage		22 October 1976	SU5094405331; 50°50′43″N 1°16′40″W		1230608	Nook Cottages More images	Q26524276
Blacksmiths House at the Forge	II	Hook Lane, Hook			7 May 1975	SU5096605346; 50°50′43″N 1°16′39″W		1094261	Upload Photo	Q26386591
The Nook	II	Hook Lane, Hook			22 October 1976	SU5091805314; 50°50′42″N 1°16′41″W		1094260	Upload Photo	Q26386590
The Old Smithy at the Forge	II	Hook Lane, Hook			7 May 1975	SU5097605355; 50°50′44″N 1°16′38″W		1094262	Upload Photo	Q26386592
Cadets' Residence (hudson, Shackleton and Wilson), Linked Walkway and Refectory Block (moyana), at the Warsash Maritime Academy	II	Hook Park Road, Southampton, SO31 9ZL			30 March 1993	SU4919205281; 50°50′42″N 1°18′10″W		1249613	Upload Photo	Q26541729
Hazel Cottage	II	Hook Park Road, Hook			22 October 1976	SU5057005411; 50°50′46″N 1°16′59″W		1230727	Upload Photo	Q26524387
Hook Cottage	II	Hook Park Road, Hook			22 October 1976	SU5045405424; 50°50′46″N 1°17′05″W		1351266	Upload Photo	Q26634385
Old Dormy House	II	Hook Park Road, Hook			18 October 1955	SU4953904967; 50°50′32″N 1°17′52″W		1278467	Upload Photo	Q26567791
Post Box Cottage	II	Hook Park Road, Hook			22 October 1976	SU5039305384; 50°50′45″N 1°17′08″W		1094264	Upload Photo	Q26386594
Walls Attached to Each End of Old Dormy House	II	Hook Park Road, Hook			22 October 1976	SU4952504941; 50°50′31″N 1°17′53″W		1094263	Upload Photo	Q26386593
Portchester House	II	Hospital Lane, Portchester			18 October 1955	SU6228904531; 50°50′13″N 1°07′00″W		1230758	Upload Photo	Q26524411
Earl's Charity	II	347, Hunts Pond Road, Titchfield Common			22 October 1976	SU5277706303; 50°51′14″N 1°15′06″W		1278384	Upload Photo	Q26567714
Course House	II	Hunts Pond Road, Titchfield Common			22 October 1976	SU5234606912; 50°51′34″N 1°15′28″W		1351267	Upload Photo	Q26634386
Funtley House	II	Iron Mill Lane			22 October 1976	SU5508608120; 50°52′12″N 1°13′07″W		1094265	Upload Photo	Q26386595
Great Abshot House	II	Little Abshot Road, Hook			18 October 1955	SU5160905665; 50°50′54″N 1°16′06″W		1094225	Upload Photo	Q26386557
Little Abshot Farmhouse	II	Little Abshot Road, Hook			22 October 1976	SU5174805648; 50°50′53″N 1°15′59″W		1094226	Upload Photo	Q26386558
The Stables of Great Abshot House	II	Little Abshot Road, Hook			22 October 1976	SU5158905707; 50°50′55″N 1°16′07″W		1351286	Upload Photo	Q26634403
Little Park Farmhouse (now Divided Into 2 Houses)	II	Little Park Farm Road, Park Gate			22 October 1976	SU5234008402; 50°52′22″N 1°15′27″W		1351287	Upload Photo	Q26634404
2, Lower Quay	II	2, Lower Quay			22 October 1976	SU5786805664; 50°50′51″N 1°10′46″W		1351288	Upload Photo	Q26634405
Fishermans Cottage	II	3, Lower Quay			22 October 1976	SU5789705656; 50°50′51″N 1°10′44″W		1094229	Upload Photo	Q26386561
9, Lower Quay	II	9, Lower Quay			22 October 1976	SU5789705643; 50°50′51″N 1°10′44″W		1338886	Upload Photo	Q26623171
11 and 12, Lower Quay	II	11 and 12, Lower Quay			22 October 1976	SU5789705636; 50°50′50″N 1°10′44″W		1094230	Upload Photo	Q26386562
Rope Walk Cottage	II	14, Lower Quay			22 October 1976	SU5789305614; 50°50′50″N 1°10′45″W		1338887	Upload Photo	Q26623172
Curtis Depository	II	Lower Quay			22 October 1976	SU5785805673; 50°50′52″N 1°10′46″W		1094227	Upload Photo	Q26386559
Fareham Motor Boat and Sailing Club House	II	Lower Quay			22 October 1976	SU5792705635; 50°50′50″N 1°10′43″W		1094232	Upload Photo	Q26386564
Prospect House	II	Lower Quay			22 October 1976	SU5788305659; 50°50′51″N 1°10′45″W		1094228	Upload Photo	Q26386560
Second Fareham Sea Scout Headquarters	II	Lower Quay			22 October 1976	SU5793205604; 50°50′49″N 1°10′43″W		1278376	Upload Photo	Q26567707
Thatched Cottage	II	28, Mays Lane			22 October 1976	SU5554303604; 50°49′46″N 1°12′46″W		1338888	Upload Photo	Q26623173
Former Meoncross Girls School	II	Meoncross School, Burnt House Lane, PO14 2EF, Stubbington			22 October 1976	SU5579403725; 50°49′49″N 1°12′33″W		1229142	Upload Photo	Q26522922
Fort Wallington	II	Military Road, Wallington			22 October 1976	SU5881406778; 50°51′27″N 1°09′57″W		1094233	Upload Photo	Q26386565
Place House Cottages	II	1, Mill Lane, Titchfield			5 August 1994	SU5427506508; 50°51′20″N 1°13′49″W		1249666	Upload Photo	Q26541776
Place House Cottages and Garden Boundary Wall Adjoining East	II	2 and 3, Mill Lane, Titchfield			5 August 1994	SU5427506524; 50°51′20″N 1°13′49″W		1249670	Upload Photo	Q26541780
Abbey Cottage (now Divided Into 2 Houses)	II	Mill Lane, Titchfield			22 October 1976	SU5420206718; 50°51′27″N 1°13′53″W		1338890	Upload Photo	Q26623175
Barn at Carron Row Farm	II	Mill Lane, Titchfield			22 October 1976	SU5406606852; 50°51′31″N 1°14′00″W		1094236	Upload Photo	Q26386567
Barn at Segensworth House	II	Mill Lane, Titchfield			22 October 1976	SU5418207073; 50°51′38″N 1°13′54″W		1230990	Upload Photo	Q26524634
Fern Hill Farmhouse	II	Mill Lane, Titchfield			22 October 1976	SU5392606567; 50°51′22″N 1°14′07″W		1230997	Upload Photo	Q26524641
Fishermans Arms	II	Mill Lane, Titchfield	pub		22 October 1976	SU5430206604; 50°51′23″N 1°13′48″W		1338889	Fishermans Arms More images	Q26623174
Mill House Titchfield Mill	II	Mill Lane, Titchfield	mill building		22 October 1976	SU5419606133; 50°51′08″N 1°13′53″W		1230965	Mill House Titchfield Mill More images	Q26524608
Monastic Barn of Titchfield Abbey at Fern Hill Farm	I	Mill Lane, Titchfield	barn		18 October 1955	SU5395106489; 50°51′19″N 1°14′06″W		1094235	Monastic Barn of Titchfield Abbey at Fern Hill Farm More images	Q17528344
Segensworth House	II	Mill Lane, Titchfield			22 October 1976	SU5421607110; 50°51′39″N 1°13′52″W		1094234	Upload Photo	Q26386566
1, Mill Street	II	1, Mill Street, Titchfield	building		22 October 1976	SU5413705953; 50°51′02″N 1°13′56″W		1232685	1, Mill Street More images	Q26526198
3, Mill Street	II	3, Mill Street, Titchfield			22 October 1976	SU5414305977; 50°51′03″N 1°13′56″W		1094237	Upload Photo	Q26386568
No 5 (including Garage at Side)	II	5, Mill Street, Titchfield			22 October 1976	SU5415406013; 50°51′04″N 1°13′56″W		1276957	Upload Photo	Q26566428
Nos 7 to 19 (including Former Malthouse Adjacent to Nom13)	II	7-19, Mill Street, Titchfield	building		18 October 1955	SU5415706040; 50°51′05″N 1°13′55″W		1094238	Nos 7 to 19 (including Former Malthouse Adjacent to Nom13) More images	Q26386569
12, Mill Street	II	12, Mill Street, Titchfield			22 October 1976	SU5414706055; 50°51′05″N 1°13′56″W		1232689	Upload Photo	Q26526202
Oneday Cottage	II	Mill Street, Titchfield	cottage		22 October 1976	SU5412305961; 50°51′02″N 1°13′57″W		1094239	Oneday Cottage More images	Q26386570
Foxbury Cottages Foxbury Farmhouse	II	2, Newgate Lane, Peel Common			18 October 1955	SU5711203648; 50°49′46″N 1°11′26″W		1094242	Upload Photo	Q26386573
Carriston Cottage	II	Newgate Lane, Peel Cottage			22 October 1976	SU5695003223; 50°49′33″N 1°11′34″W		1232711	Upload Photo	Q26526223
Fort Fareham	II	Newgate Lane	bunker		22 October 1976	SU5733604907; 50°50′27″N 1°11′13″W		1094240	Fort Fareham More images	Q5471140
Iron Bridge at Fort Fareham	II	Newgate Lane			22 October 1976	SU5732904844; 50°50′25″N 1°11′14″W		1094241	Upload Photo	Q26386572
45 and 47, Newton Road	II	45 and 47, Newton Road, Warsash			9 April 1980	SU4941705940; 50°51′03″N 1°17′58″W		1276483	Upload Photo	Q26565991
Farthing House Hamble House	II	42, Newtown Road, Warsash			22 October 1976	SU4927805964; 50°51′04″N 1°18′05″W		1232719	Upload Photo	Q26526231
1-8, North Wallington	II	1-8, North Wallington			22 October 1976	SU5835006760; 50°51′27″N 1°10′21″W		1338891	Upload Photo	Q26623177
13,14 and 14a, North Wallington	II	13, 14 and 14a, North Wallington			22 October 1976	SU5837206807; 50°51′28″N 1°10′19″W		1232722	Upload Photo	Q26526234
40-43, North Wallington	II	40-43, North Wallington			22 October 1976	SU5844706921; 50°51′32″N 1°10′15″W		1094244	Upload Photo	Q26386575
Former Barn Attached to No 1	II	North Wallington			22 October 1976	SU5833806748; 50°51′26″N 1°10′21″W		1094243	Upload Photo	Q26386574
Great Crabthorn	II	80, Old Street, Hill Head			22 October 1976	SU5437602947; 50°49′25″N 1°13′46″W		1338892	Upload Photo	Q26623178
Front Garden Wall and Gate Piers at No 32 (bembridge House Flats 1,2,3 and 4	II	2, 3 and 4, Osborn Road			22 October 1976	SU5797006489; 50°51′18″N 1°10′40″W		1276912	Upload Photo	Q26566385
Holy Trinity Rectory	II	20, Osborn Road			22 October 1976	SU5766206488; 50°51′18″N 1°10′56″W		1094202	Upload Photo	Q26386532
Ellesmere House	II	22, Osborn Road			22 October 1976	SU5771106485; 50°51′18″N 1°10′53″W		1094203	Upload Photo	Q26386533
The Grange	II	24, Osborn Road			25 February 2008	SU5774406492; 50°51′18″N 1°10′52″W		1392415	Upload Photo	Q26671635
Bishopsgrove	II	26, Osborn Road			1 November 2007	SU5777706496; 50°51′18″N 1°10′50″W		1392316	Upload Photo	Q26671542
The Vicarage	II	30, Osborn Road			22 October 1976	SU5792806521; 50°51′19″N 1°10′42″W		1094205	Upload Photo	Q26386535
Boundary Wall to Horseshoe Cottage (also Forms Lower Part of House and Wall	II	Osborn Road			22 October 1976	SU5808006549; 50°51′20″N 1°10′34″W		1276879	Upload Photo	Q26566357
Churchyard Walls to St Peter and St Pauls Church	II	Osborn Road			22 October 1976	SU5809206528; 50°51′19″N 1°10′34″W		1338912	Upload Photo	Q26623196
Front Garden Wall and Gate Piers at No 22 (ellesmere House)	II	Osborn Road			22 October 1976	SU5771506455; 50°51′17″N 1°10′53″W		1232803	Upload Photo	Q26526311
Front Garden Wall and Gate Piers at No 24	II	Osborn Road			22 October 1976	SU5774906460; 50°51′17″N 1°10′51″W		1338913	Upload Photo	Q26623197
Front Garden Wall and Gate Piers at No 26	II	Osborn Road			22 October 1976	SU5778706465; 50°51′17″N 1°10′49″W		1232811	Upload Photo	Q26526319
Front Garden Wall and Gate Piers at No 28	II	Osborn Road			22 October 1976	SU5787506477; 50°51′18″N 1°10′45″W		1276902	Upload Photo	Q26566376
Front Garden Wall and Gate Piers at No 30 (the Vicarage)	II	Osborn Road			22 October 1976	SU5793006484; 50°51′18″N 1°10′42″W		1094206	Upload Photo	Q26386536
Front Garden Wall and Gate Piers at No 34 (nos 1 and 2 Wilton Lodge)	II	Osborn Road			22 October 1976	SU5799206492; 50°51′18″N 1°10′39″W		1338915	Upload Photo	Q26623199
Front Garden Wall and Gate Piers at No 36 (victoria Lodge)	II	Osborn Road			22 October 1976	SU5801306494; 50°51′18″N 1°10′38″W		1232840	Upload Photo	Q26526346
Front Garden Wall and Gate Piers at No 38 (hawkstone House)	II	Osborn Road			22 October 1976	SU5804506498; 50°51′18″N 1°10′36″W		1094207	Upload Photo	Q26386537
Front Garden Wall at Medecroft	II	Osborn Road			22 October 1976	SU5784606472; 50°51′18″N 1°10′46″W		1338914	Upload Photo	Q26623198
Front Garden Wall at Wyngreen	II	Osborn Road			22 October 1976	SU5782606470; 50°51′18″N 1°10′47″W		1094204	Upload Photo	Q26386534
Screen Wall and Attached Former Farmhouse, Outbuildings and Yard Wall Forming East Side of Home Farm Yard at Cams Hall	II	Portchester Road			20 December 1989	SU5887605785; 50°50′55″N 1°09′54″W		1233901	Upload Photo	Q26527338
14 Beacon Bottom	II	14 Beacon Bottom, Park Gate, Southampton, SO31 7GQ			2 July 2024	SU5141908693; 50°52′32″N 1°16′14″W		1491074	Upload Photo	Q136357771
Uplands	II	61, Park Lane			22 October 1976	SU5737507249; 50°51′43″N 1°11′10″W		1232855	Upload Photo	Q26526359
67, Park Lane	II	67, Park Lane			22 October 1976	SU5752607382; 50°51′47″N 1°11′02″W		1276838	Upload Photo	Q26566322
Gate Piers at No 61 (uplands)	II	Park Lane			22 October 1976	SU5753007369; 50°51′47″N 1°11′02″W		1276855	Upload Photo	Q26566335
Northwood House	II	Park Lane			22 October 1976	SU5758806604; 50°51′22″N 1°11′00″W		1276884	Upload Photo	Q26566361
Old Park House	II	Park Lane, Stubbington			22 October 1976	SU5520403148; 50°49′31″N 1°13′03″W		1232876	Upload Photo	Q26526380
Heathfield Manor	II	Peak Lane, Heathfield			22 October 1976	SU5560206021; 50°51′04″N 1°12′41″W		1276856	Upload Photo	Q26566336
North Fareham Farmhouse	II	Pooks Lane			22 October 1976	SU5834207785; 50°52′00″N 1°10′20″W		1232921	Upload Photo	Q26526421
Cams Hall	II*	Portchester Road	English country house		18 October 1955	SU5893605738; 50°50′53″N 1°09′51″W		1232890	Cams Hall More images	Q5028791
Cartshed with Loft Over and Attached Farmyard Wall with Outbuildings at Home Farm at Cams Hall	II	Portchester Road			20 December 1989	SU5884305826; 50°50′56″N 1°09′56″W		1233919	Upload Photo	Q26527354
Former Farmhouse and Attached Yard Wall on North West Side of Home Farm Yard at Cams Hall	II	Portchester Road			20 December 1989	SU5882105827; 50°50′56″N 1°09′57″W		1276383	Upload Photo	Q26565899
L Shaped Barn Range on West Side of Home Farm Yard at Cams Hall with Yard Walls Attached at South East and North East Corners	II	Portchester Road			20 December 1989	SU5881605786; 50°50′55″N 1°09′57″W		1276382	Upload Photo	Q26565898
Orangery at Cams Hall	II	Portchester Road			22 October 1976	SU5885405764; 50°50′54″N 1°09′55″W		1276862	Upload Photo	Q26566342
Pond Wall in Home Farm Yard at Cams Hall	II	Portchester Road			20 December 1989	SU5883905795; 50°50′55″N 1°09′56″W		1233930	Upload Photo	Q26527364
Railway Viaduct	II	Portchester Road	railway viaduct		22 October 1976	SU5871806259; 50°51′10″N 1°10′02″W		1232889	Railway Viaduct More images	Q26526391
Stables at Cams Hall Home Farm	II	Portchester Road			22 October 1976	SU5883705762; 50°50′54″N 1°09′56″W		1232956	Upload Photo	Q26526451
Walled Garden with Attached Garden House and Outbuildings at Cams Hall	II	Portchester Road			20 December 1989	SU5872405610; 50°50′49″N 1°10′02″W		1276355	Upload Photo	Q26565872
Great Posbrook	II*	Posbrook Lane, Titchfield			18 October 1955	SU5359205033; 50°50′32″N 1°14′25″W		1233024	Upload Photo	Q17533789
Meon Marsh Sealock and Bridge	II	Posbrook Lane			8 November 1990	SU5316602720; 50°49′18″N 1°14′48″W		1233937	Upload Photo	Q26527371
Southern Barn at Great Posbrook Farm	II*	Posbrook Lane, Titchfield			22 October 1976	SU5353404978; 50°50′31″N 1°14′28″W		1233029	Upload Photo	Q17533799
Railway Viaduct	II	Quay Street	railway viaduct		22 October 1976	SU5801205953; 50°51′01″N 1°10′38″W		1232957	Railway Viaduct More images	Q26680354
Boundary Oak School, Roche Court	II	Roche Court, Wickham Road, PO17 5BL			22 October 1976	SU5799108279; 50°52′16″N 1°10′38″W		1233653	Upload Photo	Q26527108
Lodge at Boundary Oaks School, Roche Court	II	Roche Court, Wickham Road			22 October 1976	SU5782708094; 50°52′10″N 1°10′47″W		1233649	Upload Photo	Q26527104
Rose Cottage	II	1 and 2, Sarisbury Green, Sarisbury			22 October 1976	SU5010808665; 50°52′31″N 1°17′21″W		1232959	Upload Photo	Q26526453
Church of St Paul	II	Sarisbury Green, Sarisbury	church building		22 October 1976	SU5025808697; 50°52′32″N 1°17′13″W		1276772	Church of St Paul More images	Q26566259
Lychgate to St Pauls's Churchyard	II	Sarisbury Green, Sarisbury			22 October 1976	SU5023408705; 50°52′32″N 1°17′15″W		1276819	Upload Photo	Q26566304
Oak Cottage	II	Sarisbury Green, Sarisbury			22 October 1976	SU4999208745; 50°52′34″N 1°17′27″W		1233156	Upload Photo	Q26526638
War Memorial in St Paul's Churchyard	II	Sarisbury Green, Sarisbury	war memorial		22 October 1976	SU5024808728; 50°52′33″N 1°17′14″W		1233126	War Memorial in St Paul's Churchyard More images	Q26526608
Former Barn at Shoot Farm	II	Shoot Lane, Chark Common			22 October 1976	SU5735801678; 50°48′43″N 1°11′14″W		1232960	Upload Photo	Q26526454
Shoot Farmhouse	II	Shoot Lane, Chark Common			22 October 1976	SU5733801704; 50°48′43″N 1°11′15″W		1276820	Upload Photo	Q26566305
The Anchorage the Watch	II	62-72, Shore Road, Warsash			28 February 1975	SU4899706109; 50°51′09″N 1°18′19″W		1276755	Upload Photo	Q26566244
5-13, South Street	II	5-13, South Street, Titchfield	building		22 October 1976	SU5398205746; 50°50′55″N 1°14′04″W		1233166	5-13, South Street More images	Q26526647
6 and 8, South Street	II	6 and 8, South Street, Titchfield	building		22 October 1976	SU5400305763; 50°50′56″N 1°14′03″W		1276732	6 and 8, South Street More images	Q26566225
14 and 16, South Street	II	14 and 16, South Street, Titchfield			22 October 1976	SU5399705741; 50°50′55″N 1°14′04″W		1233191	Upload Photo	Q26526670
19, South Street	II	19, South Street, Titchfield			22 October 1976	SU5397405715; 50°50′54″N 1°14′05″W		1276821	Upload Photo	Q26566306
20 Andf 22, South Street	II	20 Andf 22, South Street, Titchfield			22 October 1976	SU5399605727; 50°50′55″N 1°14′04″W		1276733	Upload Photo	Q26566226
25, South Street	II	25, South Street, Titchfield			22 October 1976	SU5396905687; 50°50′53″N 1°14′05″W		1276730	Upload Photo	Q26566223
28-30, South Street	II*	28-30, South Street, Titchfield			18 October 1955	SU5398505696; 50°50′54″N 1°14′04″W		1276734	Upload Photo	Q17533868
32, South Street	II	32, South Street, Titchfield	building		22 October 1976	SU5398405683; 50°50′53″N 1°14′04″W		1233194	32, South Street More images	Q26526673
38, South Street	II	38, South Street, Titchfield	building		22 October 1976	SU5398305668; 50°50′53″N 1°14′04″W		1233195	38, South Street More images	Q26526674
40 and 42, South Street	II	40 and 42, South Street, Titchfield			22 October 1976	SU5398505645; 50°50′52″N 1°14′04″W		1233204	Upload Photo	Q26526683
41 and 43, South Street	II	41 and 43, South Street, Titchfield			22 October 1976	SU5396605640; 50°50′52″N 1°14′05″W		1276731	Upload Photo	Q26566224
44 and 46, South Street	II	44 and 46, South Street, Titchfield			18 October 1955	SU5399405602; 50°50′51″N 1°14′04″W		1233205	Upload Photo	Q26526684
45, South Street	II	45, South Street, Titchfield			22 October 1976	SU5396605634; 50°50′52″N 1°14′05″W		1233190	Upload Photo	Q26526669
Little Park Cottages	II	1 and 2, Southampton Road, Park Gate			22 October 1976	SU5190208139; 50°52′14″N 1°15′50″W		1233206	Upload Photo	Q26526685
Greenhill Cottage	II	Spurlings Lane			22 October 1976	SU5889907367; 50°51′46″N 1°09′52″W		1233224	Upload Photo	Q26526704
West Hill Park School	II	St Margarets Lane, Titchfield			18 October 1955	SU5322505795; 50°50′57″N 1°14′43″W		1232958	Upload Photo	Q99937506
Building in the Garden of the Georgian House, St Margarets Priory the Old Malt House	II	St Margarets Priory, St Margarets Lane, Titchfield			22 October 1976	SU5337706108; 50°51′07″N 1°14′35″W		1276780	Upload Photo	Q26566267
Swanwick Lane	II	Swanwick			22 October 1976	SU5129309523; 50°52′59″N 1°16′20″W		1233226	Upload Photo	Q26526706
Thatched Cottage	II	292, Swanwick Lane, Swanwick			22 October 1976	SU4954009602; 50°53′02″N 1°17′50″W		1276711	Upload Photo	Q26566206
Barn to Rear of Morgan's Farmhouse	II	Swanwick Lane			8 October 1992	SU5124309585; 50°53′01″N 1°16′23″W		1233961	Upload Photo	Q26527395
Friends Farmhouse	II	Swanwick Lane, Swanwick			22 October 1976	SU5128009515; 50°52′58″N 1°16′21″W		1233225	Upload Photo	Q26526705
Lower Swanwick Farmhouse	II	Swanwick Lane, Swanwick			18 October 1955	SU4974109722; 50°53′05″N 1°17′39″W		1233230	Upload Photo	Q26526710
Manor Farmhouse	II	Swanwick Lane, Swanwick			22 October 1976	SU5069309592; 50°53′01″N 1°16′51″W		1233228	Upload Photo	Q26526708
Morgan's Farmhouse	II	Swanwick Lane, Swanwick			22 October 1976	SU5124109555; 50°53′00″N 1°16′23″W		1233227	Upload Photo	Q26526707
Bay Tree Cottages	II	1 and 2, Swanwick Shore Road, Lower Swanwick			22 October 1976	SU4956109299; 50°52′52″N 1°17′49″W		1276681	Upload Photo	Q26566178
Victory Cottages	II	1-6, Swanwick Shore Road, Lower Swanwick			22 October 1976	SU4955609314; 50°52′52″N 1°17′49″W		1233244	Upload Photo	Q26526723
Building Adjacent to No 1 Victory Cottages	II	Swanwick Shore Road, Lower Swanwick			22 October 1976	SU4957209332; 50°52′53″N 1°17′48″W		1233277	Upload Photo	Q26526755
The Hard	II	Swanwick Shore Road, Lower Swanwick			22 October 1976	SU4954909294; 50°52′52″N 1°17′49″W		1233232	Upload Photo	Q26526712
Tudor Cottage	II	Swanwick Shore Road, Lower Swanwick			18 October 1955	SU4959409259; 50°52′51″N 1°17′47″W		1233231	Upload Photo	Q26526711
Bishopwood	II*	The Avenue			18 October 1955	SU5670606126; 50°51′07″N 1°11′45″W		1093540	Upload Photo	Q17533692
Blackbrook House Maternity Home	II	The Avenue			22 October 1976	SU5628406266; 50°51′11″N 1°12′06″W		1339250	Upload Photo	Q26623515
Blackbrook Lodge	II	The Avenue			22 October 1976	SU5666506162; 50°51′08″N 1°11′47″W		1093541	Upload Photo	Q26385876
Gate Piers at Bishopwood	II	The Avenue			22 October 1976	SU5670306176; 50°51′08″N 1°11′45″W		1339249	Upload Photo	Q26623514
Ladyline Limited, the Mill	II	The Mill, Lower Quay			22 October 1976	SU5792905654; 50°50′51″N 1°10′43″W		1094231	Upload Photo	Q26386563
5, Titchfield Road	II	5, Titchfield Road, Stubbington			22 October 1976	SU5541203305; 50°49′36″N 1°12′53″W		1233282	Upload Photo	Q26526758
117, Titchfield Road	II	117, Titchfield Road, Stubbington			22 October 1976	SU5506803897; 50°49′55″N 1°13′10″W		1276696	Upload Photo	Q26566191
123, Titchfield Road	II	123, Titchfield Road, Stubbington			22 October 1976	SU5505303948; 50°49′57″N 1°13′11″W		1233283	Upload Photo	Q26526759
Anker Cottage	II	Titchfield Road, Crofton			22 October 1976	SU5510404013; 50°49′59″N 1°13′08″W		1233278	Upload Photo	Q26526756
Crofton Manor Hotel	II	Titchfield Road, Crofton			22 October 1976	SU5508204191; 50°50′05″N 1°13′09″W		1233280	Upload Photo	Q26526757
Crofton Old Church	II*	Titchfield Road, Crofton	church building		18 October 1955	SU5510804183; 50°50′04″N 1°13′08″W		1233279	Crofton Old Church More images	Q17533811
Hollam House	II	Titchfield Road, Stubbington			18 October 1955	SU5445005196; 50°50′37″N 1°13′41″W		1233285	Upload Photo	Q26526761
Dovecote at Cams Hall, to South West of Stables	II	To South West Of Stables, Portchester Road			20 December 1989	SU5880705751; 50°50′54″N 1°09′58″W		1276354	Upload Photo	Q26565871
Little Posbrook Cottage	II	Triangle Lane, Little Posbrook			22 October 1976	SU5372303958; 50°49′58″N 1°14′19″W		1233289	Upload Photo	Q26526765
Lower Posbrook Farmhouse	II	Triangle Lane, Little Posbrook			22 October 1976	SU5365803767; 50°49′51″N 1°14′22″W		1276661	Upload Photo	Q26566158
Meon Cottage	II	Triangle Lane, Little Posbrook			22 October 1976	SU5305203292; 50°49′36″N 1°14′53″W		1233286	Upload Photo	Q26526762
North Barn at Upper Posbrook Farm	II	Triangle Lane, Little Posbrook			22 October 1976	SU5373304355; 50°50′10″N 1°14′18″W		1233294	Upload Photo	Q26526769
Posbrooke Gardens	II	Triangle Lane, Little Posbrook			22 October 1976	SU5363404204; 50°50′06″N 1°14′23″W		1233290	Upload Photo	Q26526766
Upper Posbrook Farmhouse	II	Triangle Lane, Little Posbrook			18 October 1955	SU5372004333; 50°50′10″N 1°14′19″W		1233291	Upload Photo	Q26526767
1, Union Street	II	1, Union Street			22 October 1976	SU5825806233; 50°51′10″N 1°10′26″W		1276648	Upload Photo	Q26566146
2, Union Street	II	2, Union Street			18 October 1955	SU5825906221; 50°51′09″N 1°10′25″W		1276668	Upload Photo	Q26566165
3, Union Street	II	3, Union Street			22 October 1976	SU5825806213; 50°51′09″N 1°10′26″W		1276654	Upload Photo	Q26566152
Malt House Cottage	II	4, Union Street			22 October 1976	SU5825806205; 50°51′09″N 1°10′26″W		1233306	Upload Photo	Q26526781
7, Union Street	II	7, Union Street			22 October 1976	SU5825806200; 50°51′09″N 1°10′26″W		1233308	Upload Photo	Q26526783
8 and 9, Union Street	II	8 and 9, Union Street			22 October 1976	SU5825706194; 50°51′08″N 1°10′26″W		1276670	Upload Photo	Q26566167
Corrall's Office Building	II	Upper Quay	building		22 October 1976	SU5802605921; 50°51′00″N 1°10′38″W		1276671	Corrall's Office Building More images	Q26566168
Wallington Bridge	II	Wallington Hill, Wallington			22 October 1976	SU5833006730; 50°51′26″N 1°10′22″W		1233388	Upload Photo	Q26526858
52 Wallington Shore Road	II	52, Wallington Shore Road			22 October 1976	SU5882306260; 50°51′10″N 1°09′57″W		1232924	Upload Photo	Q26526423
1 and 3, West Street	II	1 and 3, West Street			22 October 1976	SU5819906203; 50°51′09″N 1°10′29″W		1233390	Upload Photo	Q26526860
3, West Street	II	3, West Street, Titchfield			22 October 1976	SU5394305799; 50°50′57″N 1°14′06″W		1233400	Upload Photo	Q26526871
5, West Street	II	5, West Street			22 October 1976	SU5819106205; 50°51′09″N 1°10′29″W		1233391	Upload Photo	Q26526861
6,6a and 8, West Street	II	6, 6a and 8, West Street			14 January 1992	SU5819206180; 50°51′08″N 1°10′29″W		1233939	Upload Photo	Q26527373
No 7 West Street	II	7, West Street, Titchfield, PO14 4DH			22 October 1976	SU5393605800; 50°50′57″N 1°14′07″W		1233475	Upload Photo	Q26526940
9, West Street	II	9, West Street, Titchfield			22 October 1976	SU5393005801; 50°50′57″N 1°14′07″W		1233401	Upload Photo	Q26526872
10, West Street	II	10, West Street, Titchfield			18 October 1955	SU5395605782; 50°50′57″N 1°14′06″W		1233538	Upload Photo	Q26526996
West Court West Court Cottage	II	12, West Street, Titchfield			22 October 1976	SU5394005785; 50°50′57″N 1°14′07″W		1276552	Upload Photo	Q26566057
15, West Street	II	15, West Street, Titchfield			22 October 1976	SU5391805803; 50°50′57″N 1°14′08″W		1233404	Upload Photo	Q26526875
15, West Street	II	15, West Street			22 October 1976	SU5816206208; 50°51′09″N 1°10′30″W		1276635	Upload Photo	Q26566133
16-22, West Street	II	16-22, West Street, Titchfield			18 October 1955	SU5392305786; 50°50′57″N 1°14′07″W		1233541	Upload Photo	Q26526999
17-21, West Street	II	17-21, West Street, Titchfield			22 October 1976	SU5390805805; 50°50′57″N 1°14′08″W		1233508	Upload Photo	Q26526971
21 and 23, West Street	II	21 and 23, West Street			1 September 1981	SU5813706210; 50°51′09″N 1°10′32″W		1233849	Upload Photo	Q26527288
27, West Street	II	27, West Street, Titchfield			22 October 1976	SU5389505809; 50°50′57″N 1°14′09″W		1276639	Upload Photo	Q26566137
Ticefelle Cottage	II	35 and 37, West Street, Titchfield			22 October 1976	SU5386905814; 50°50′58″N 1°14′10″W		1233519	Upload Photo	Q26526980
36-40, West Street	II	36-40, West Street, Titchfield			22 October 1976	SU5383305801; 50°50′57″N 1°14′12″W		1276537	Upload Photo	Q26566043
The Crown Public House	II	40, West Street	pub		22 October 1976	SU5804706179; 50°51′08″N 1°10′36″W		1233393	The Crown Public House More images	Q26526863
49, West Street	II	49, West Street, Titchfield			22 October 1976	SU5382405820; 50°50′58″N 1°14′12″W		1276640	Upload Photo	Q26566138
59, West Street	II	59, West Street, Titchfield			22 October 1976	SU5380805821; 50°50′58″N 1°14′13″W		1233406	Upload Photo	Q26526877
61-69, West Street	II	61-69, West Street, Titchfield			22 October 1976	SU5379705823; 50°50′58″N 1°14′14″W		1233530	Upload Photo	Q26526990
Portland Chambers Trustee Savings Bank	II	66, West Street			18 October 1955	SU5792806192; 50°51′08″N 1°10′42″W		1233396	Upload Photo	Q26526867
Yew Tree Cottage	II	71, West Street, Titchfield			22 October 1976	SU5377405824; 50°50′58″N 1°14′15″W		1233407	Upload Photo	Q26526878
Borough Council Offices Westbury Manor	II	84, West Street			18 October 1955	SU5781106189; 50°51′08″N 1°10′48″W		1233397	Upload Photo	Q26526868
Church of the Holy Trinity	II*	West Street	church building		18 October 1955	SU5758106176; 50°51′08″N 1°11′00″W		1276622	Church of the Holy Trinity More images	Q17533856
Garage at No 10 (former Village Forge)	II	West Street, Titchfield			22 October 1976	SU5394805763; 50°50′56″N 1°14′06″W		1276532	Upload Photo	Q26566038
United Reformed Church	II	West Street	church building		22 October 1976	SU5794906186; 50°51′08″N 1°10′41″W		1233394	United Reformed Church More images	Q26526865
War Memorial on Street Boundary of Holy Trinity Churchyard	II	West Street	war memorial		22 October 1976	SU5758306201; 50°51′09″N 1°11′00″W		1233398	War Memorial on Street Boundary of Holy Trinity Churchyard More images	Q26526869
Tudor Wing, West Wing and Georgian House, St Margarets Priory	II*	West Wing And Georgian House, St Margarets Priory, St Margarets Lane, Titchfield			18 October 1955	SU5342106114; 50°51′08″N 1°14′33″W		1276854	Upload Photo	Q17533880
The Potteries	II	1, Wickham Road			22 October 1976	SU5790107095; 50°51′38″N 1°10′43″W		1233655	Upload Photo	Q26527110
Barn at Furzehall Farm with Outbuilding Adjoining to the West	II	Wickham Road			19 August 1975	SU5767407534; 50°51′52″N 1°10′55″W		1233552	Upload Photo	Q26527009
Dean Farmhouse	II*	Wickham Road			22 October 1976	SU5738808211; 50°52′14″N 1°11′09″W		1233656	Upload Photo	Q17533833
Furze Hall Farmhouse Including Range of Cowsheds Adjoining to the Rear	II	Wickham Road			19 August 1975	SU5768407560; 50°51′53″N 1°10′54″W		1233551	Upload Photo	Q26527008
The Old Manor House	II*	Wickham Road	house		22 October 1976	SU5818506667; 50°51′24″N 1°10′29″W		1233542	The Old Manor House More images	Q17533823
Two Chapels at Fareham Cemetery	II	Wickham Road	chapel		22 October 1976	SU5792007312; 50°51′45″N 1°10′42″W		1276554	Two Chapels at Fareham Cemetery More images	Q26566059

== See also ==
- Grade I listed buildings in Hampshire
- Grade II* listed buildings in Hampshire

== Sources ==
- Orbach, Julian; Pevsner, Nikolaus; Cherry, Bridget (2021), Wiltshire, The Buildings of England, New Haven and London: Yale University Press, ISBN 978-0-300-25120-3
