= Fareham Shopping Centre =

Shopping centre

Coordinates: 50.8536°N 1.1774°W

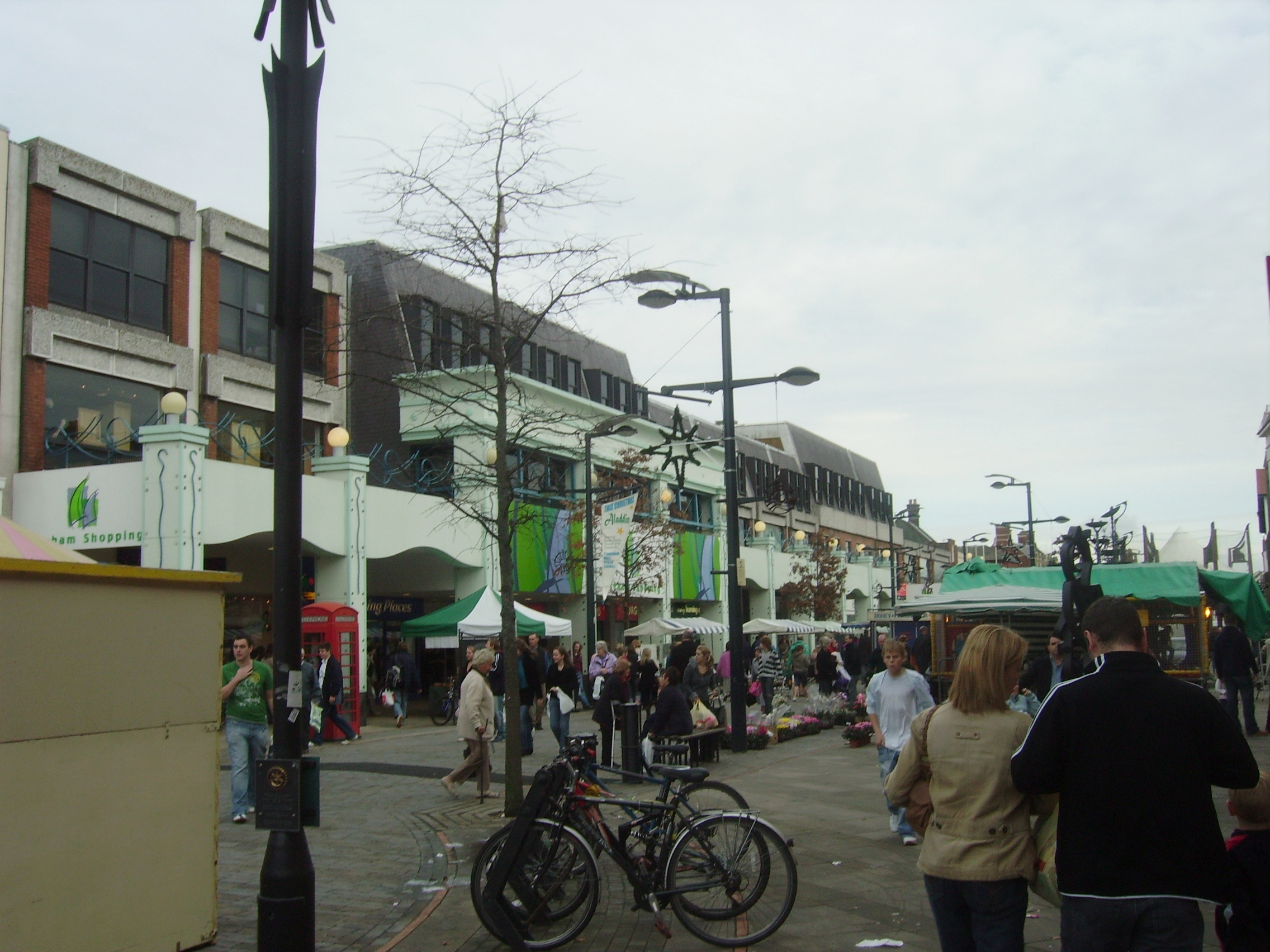

Fareham Shopping Centre is located at the heart of the centre of the Hampshire town of Fareham. Built in two phases between 1975 and 1981, the centre contains many well known retailers and is quite large for a town of its size. The shopping centre is part of a wider scheme of buildings in the town centre that were constructed around the same time.

== Neighbouring buildings ==
Neighbouring buildings include:

- Fareham Shopping Centre Car Park multi-storey car park
- A health centre
- A large library
- Fareham Live
- Fareham Borough Council - Civic Offices

== Shops ==
The shopping centre was originally anchored by a Sainsbury's supermarket, Woolworths, Boots and Marks & Spencer. The 1981 Eastern extension added a new anchor store - BHS and another multistorey car park, as well as numerous other shops. Sainsbury's moved out in the mid 1990s as the store was small by modern standards and Woolworths closed during the 2008/9 Christmas period because the retailer had gone into administration. During the mid 2000s, Portsmouth FC briefly rented a retail store at 46 Westbury Square within the shopping centre. Recent retailers to move into Fareham Shopping centre include Next (opened September 2010) and HMV (opened November 2010 - Closed in February 2011, clearly on a short-term contract for the festive season) and Debenhams which opened in Summer 2011.

Occupants
Name	Opened	Closed	Notes
Sainsbury's	1976	mid 1990s	Left due to store being small by modern standards.
Marks & Spencer	1976	2018	Will be sub-leased by chain until 2100 when lease agreement expires.
Woolworths	1976	2008	Company went into administration.
British Home Stores	1984	2016	Company went into administration
Mothercare	Unknown	Unknown	Unknown
Gamleys	Unknown	Unknown	Unknown
Halfords	1960s	1960s	Exact years of trading unknown
B&M	2017	Present	Occupies former British Home Stores unit
Bakers + Baristas	Unknown	Present	Occupies centre of Westbury Square rather than a traditional unit.
Bhavi Beauty	2014-2015 estimated	Evicted 2024	
Bonmarché	At least before 2011	Present	Planned to close multiple times in administration
Boots	1976	Present	Original occupant
Cafe Giardino	Unknown	Present	Occupies raised section of square
Card Factory		Present	
Claire's		Present	
Clarks		2023	Closure on 5 August 2023.
Clintons		Present	
Costa Coffee		Present	
David Christopher		Present	
EE		Present	
Ernest Jones		Present	
Eurochange		Present	
Fone World		Present	
GAME		Present	
Grape Tree		Present	
H. Samuel		Present	
Holland & Barrett		Present	
HSBC		Present	Has an entrance in shopping centre and on West Street
Just4Sofas		Present	
Krewskandy	2012 (assumed)	Present	Traded under the Hilbornes Group until October 2022.
Leightons Opticians and Hearing Care	2001	Present	Moved from Fareham High Street Store
Made in Italy	Unknown	Present	
Meridian Beds	2023	Present	
Michael Matthews		Present	
Millets	Unknown	Present	
New Look	Unknown	Present	
Next	Unknown	Present	
O2	Unknown	Present	
Photo-Me	Unknown	Present	
Roman	Unknown	Present	
Savers	Unknown	Present	
Shakeaway	Unknown	Present	
Shoe Zone	Unknown	Present	
Sky	Unknown	Present	
Stop and Store	Unknown	Present	
Superdrug	Unknown	Present	
The Body Shop	Unknown	Present	
The Canvas Printing Company	Unknown	Present	
The Fragrance Shop	Unknown	Present	
The Works (retailer)	Unknown	Present	
Three	Unknown	Present	
Timpson (retailer)	Unknown	Present	
Utopia	Unknown	Present	
Vision Express	Unknown	Present	
Vodafone UK	Unknown	Present	
Warren James	Unknown	Present	
Waterstones	Unknown	Present	
Yours	Unknown	Present	

== Refurbishment ==
The shopping centre had a typical 1970s dark interior until the late 1990s when it was refurbished to become much more bright and airy. The old interior featured a trail on the floor which if followed, led in a complete circle around all parts of the centre.

== Atriums ==
It features four atriums which all have names:

- Thackeray Square - The Northern atrium. The Boots, Waterstones, and Superdrug stores open up off this square which also has Cafe Giardino in the middle.
- Delme Square - The Western atrium featuring Next and formerly Marks and Spencer. This has a Costa Coffee in the centre
- Westbury Square - The South-Central square which connects to all the other malls in the centre. The square also has a BB's cafe in the middle.
- Osborn Square - part of the 1981 extension, this square was dominated by BHS until its closure in 2016. Has since been replaced by B&M.
