= Solent Arena =

Former sports venue in Fareham, Hampshire, England

- Interactive map of Solent Arena
- Location: Fareham, Hampshire, England
- Coordinates: 50°51′43.15″N 1°10′10.99″W
- Owner: Salmiakki CIC

Construction
- Opened: 2013

Tenant
- British Rink Hockey Association

Solent Arena (/ˈsoʊlənt/ SOH-lənt) was an indoor arena, in Fareham, Hampshire. It was located alongside River Wallington by the M27 motorway.

== History ==
The Solent Arena project was launched by Salmiakki CIC, a non-profit community sports organisation, in July 2012 with a view to build a purpose-built arena for non-mainstream and disabled sports on the English south coast. Location search included a wide area along the M27 corridor from Portsmouth to Southampton. The Fareham Borough Council was keen to attract the stadium into the borough due to the documented shortfall in indoor sports provision in the area and agreed to finance the project with a 50% capital cost contribution. Inline hockey was first played in the building in July 2013 by members of the Fareham Wildcats Roller Hockey Club, although the building was still unfinished.

The rink closed in October 2015 after falling into financial difficulty, when the rink was dismantled and relocated to its new home as the Bordon Roller Rink.

== Sporting events ==
The main tenant of Solent Arena was the British Rink Hockey Association, Britain's oldest inline hockey league founded in 1983. BRHA team training and game slots took up approximately half of the arena's operational hours.

The arena was also home to Lemon Hockey tournaments and there was a Guinness Book of World Records attempt at the longest inline hockey game in the world on 26–27 October 2013. In addition to inline hockey, the arena was home to floorball, box lacrosse and roller derby.

== Transport ==
Solent Arena was well served by the major road and rail networks. The M27 motorway passes just a few hundred metres from the arena, and was the main traffic artery into and out of the arena. It provided easy access to both Portsmouth and Southampton, and from there to London via the M3 and A3(M).

The A27 was the original route along the south coast before the building of the M27, and runs from Brighton to Southampton, passing through between the arena and Fareham Town Centre. The A32 gives access to Gosport and Wickham, and then through the picturesque Meon Valley to Alton.

Fareham railway station is on the West Coastway Line, with regular services to Portsmouth, Southampton, Cardiff and London.

Bus transport was provided by First Hampshire & Dorset, which runs nearly all bus routes in the area. There were two bus stops within a couple of minutes walk from the arena on Broadcut and North Wallington.

The onsite parking facility was partly shared with the Fareham Industrial Estate, essentially being the open air surface parking surrounding the eastern flank of Solent Arena. There was disabled parking available onsite, at the main car park nearest to the arena entrance. Car parking at the arena was free of charge to arena visitors.
