= Fareham =

Market town in Hampshire, England

Coordinates: 50.85°N 1.18°W

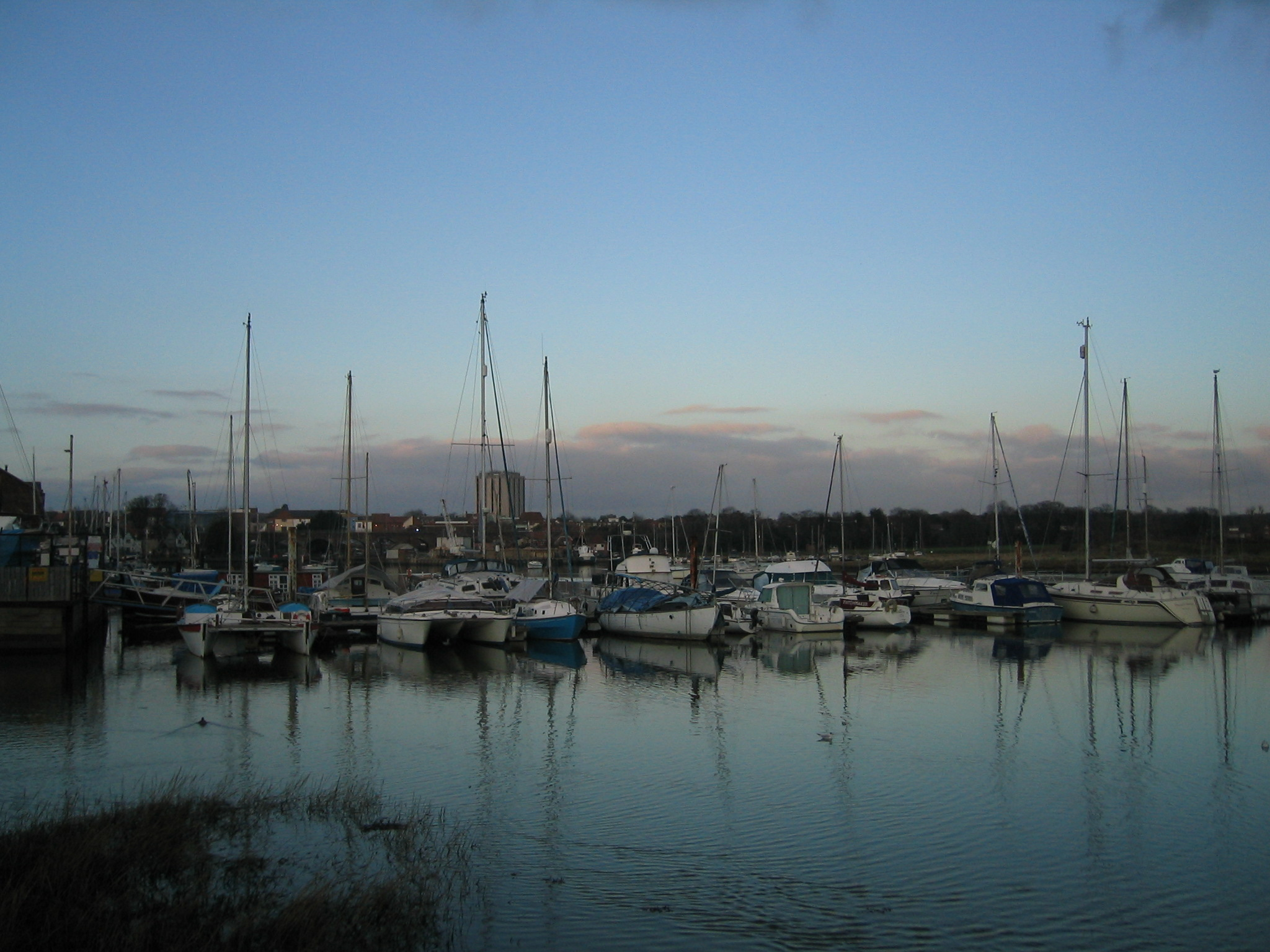
- Fareham Creek

- Location within Hampshire
- Population: 42,210 (2011 Census)
- OS grid reference: SU578048
- District: Fareham
- Shire county: Hampshire
- Region: South East
- Country: England
- Sovereign state: United Kingdom
- Post town: FAREHAM
- Postcode district: PO14 – PO17
- Dialling code: 01329, 01489, 023
- Police: Hampshire and Isle of Wight
- Fire: Hampshire and Isle of Wight
- Ambulance: South Central
- UK Parliament: Fareham and Waterlooville

Fareham (/ˈfɛərəm/ FAIR-əm) is a market town at the north-west tip of Portsmouth Harbour, between the cities of Portsmouth and Southampton in south east Hampshire, England. It gives its name to the Borough of Fareham. It was historically an important manufacturer of bricks, used to build the Royal Albert Hall, and grower of strawberries and other seasonal fruits. In 2011, it had a population of 42,210.

== History ==
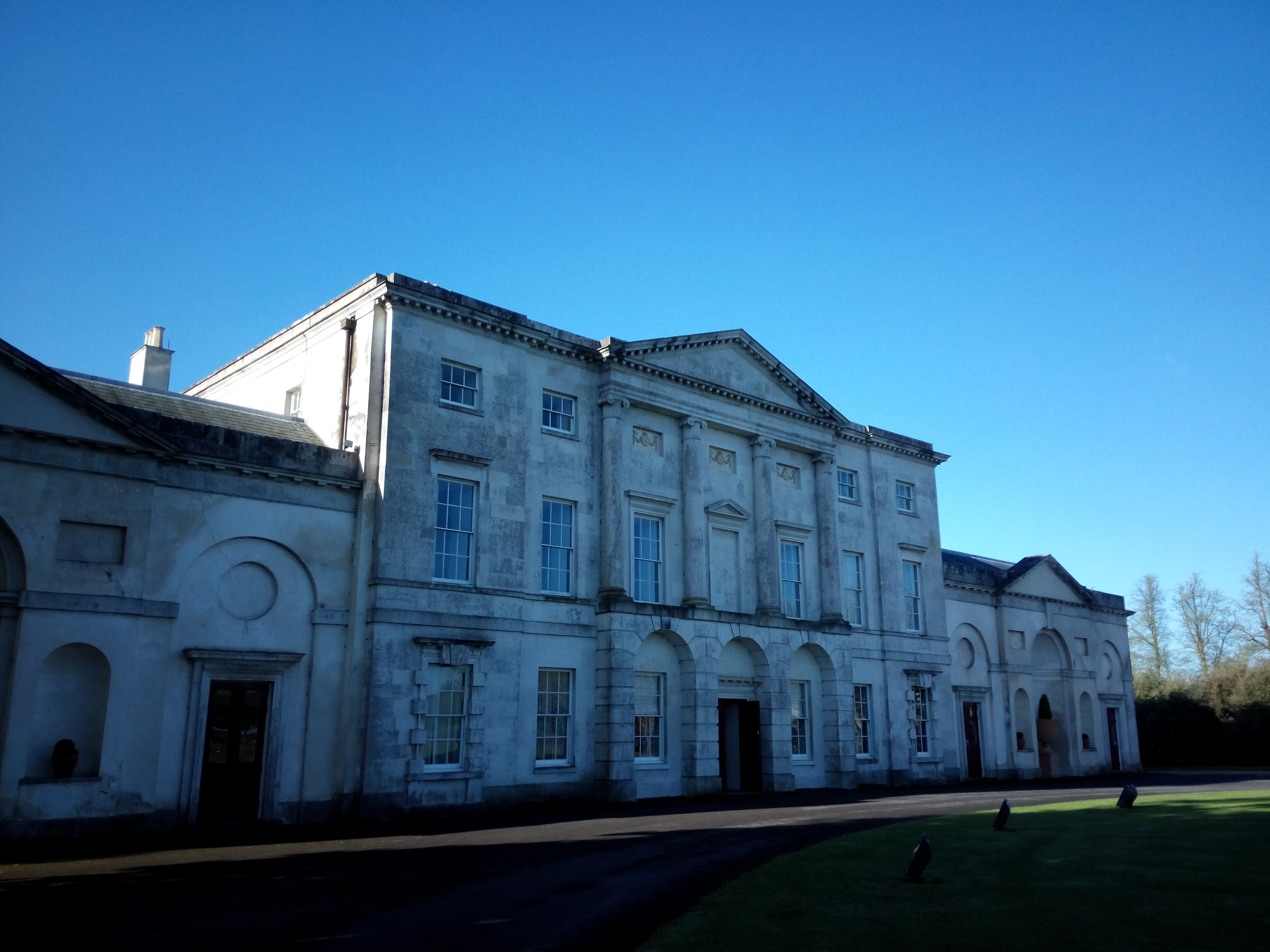
Cams Hall North Front

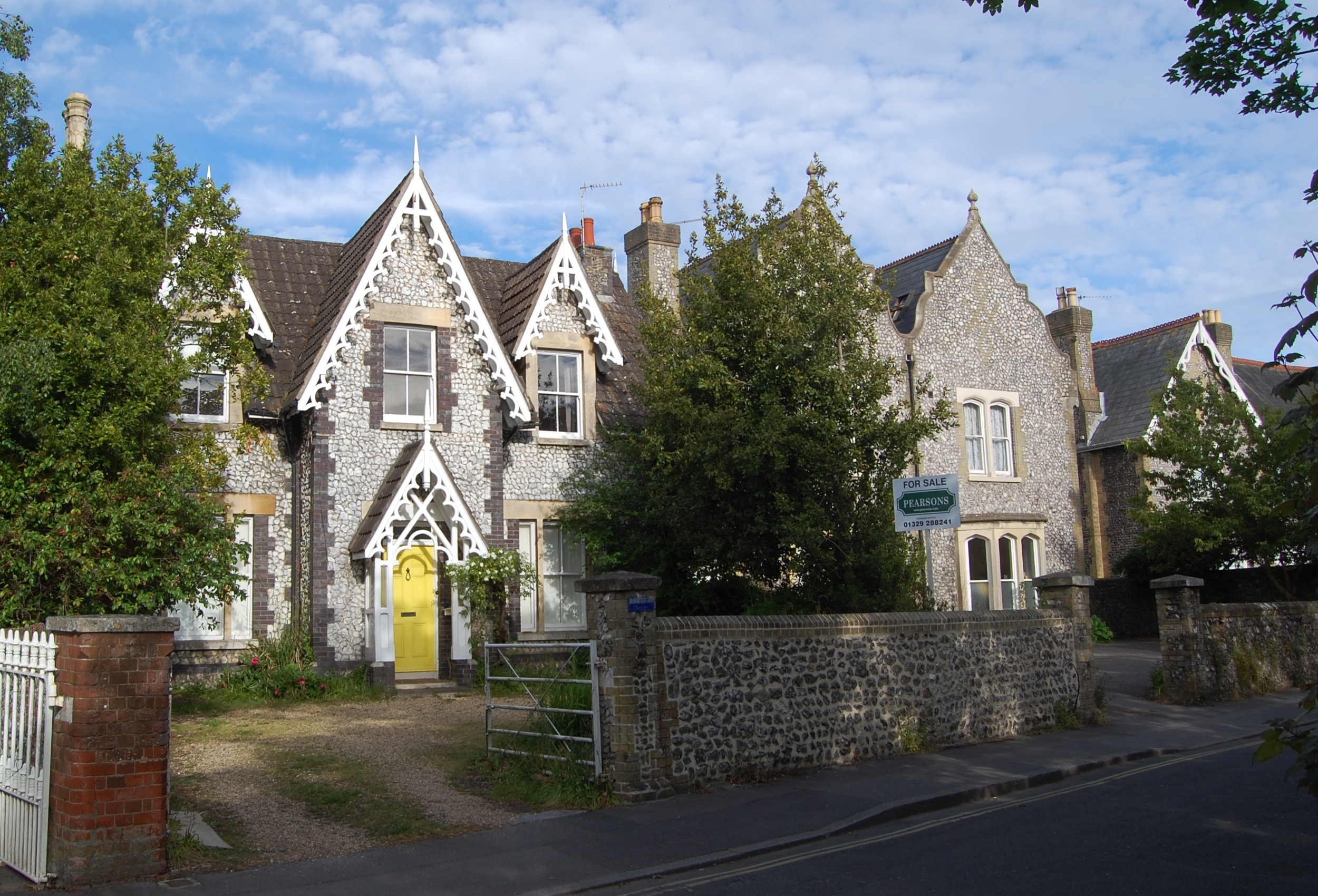
Manor Cottage, Manor House, Manor Lodge and Manor Croft, Church Path, Fareham (2019)

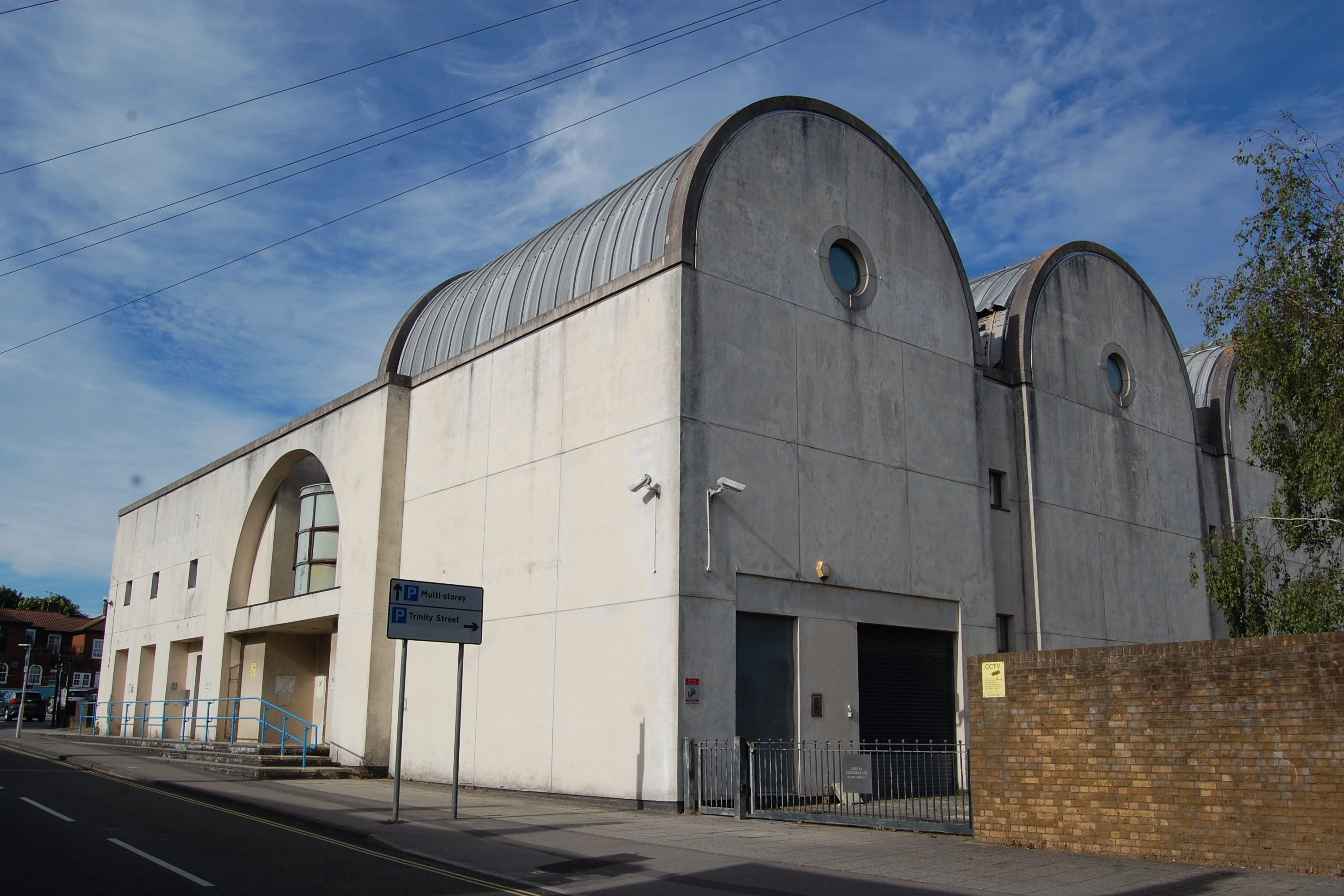
Former Fareham Magistrates Court (2019)

The town has a documented history dating back to the Norman era, when a part of William's army marched up from Fareham Creek before continuing to the Saxon capital of England, Winchester. Originally known as Ferneham (hence the name of the former entertainment venue Ferneham Hall, now Fareham Live), it was listed in the Domesday Book as having 90 households. The ford of Fareham Creek (at the top of Portsmouth Harbour) was the location of the Bishop of Winchester's mills; the foundations were subsumed in the A27 near the railway viaduct. Commercial activity continued at the port until the 1970s and continues on a smaller scale.

In the 1960s Fareham experienced major residential development. By the 1970s the town had expanded to almost encompass the surrounding villages of Funtley, Titchfield, Catisfield and Portchester. In the late 1990s a settlement called Whiteley, straddling the boundaries of Fareham Borough and the City of Winchester, was developed to the north of Junction 9 of the M27 motorway. It is predominantly residential but includes the extensive Solent Business Park.

Fareham Magistrates Court was granted planning permission in 1990, with construction completed in 1994. It closed in October 2016, following a national review of the court estate by the UK government. The magistrate court functions moved to Portsmouth.

In 1995 Cams Hall, a derelict Palladian mansion, was restored for office use, and the surrounding Cams Estate was developed as a golf course and modern technology park.

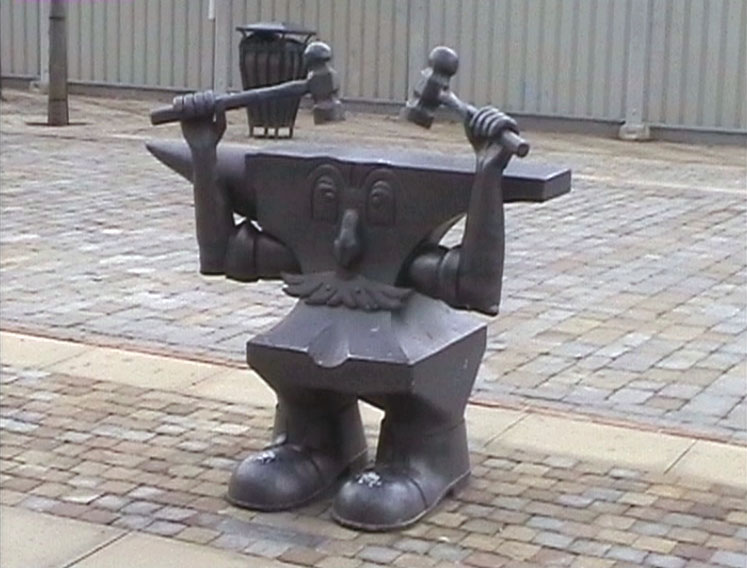
Anvil Man at the Henry Cort Sculpture Park

Since 1997 Fareham has been the home of the United Kingdom's Aeronautical Rescue Coordination Centre (ARCC), at the National Maritime Operations Centre (NMOC), and responsible for coordinating all Maritime & Coastguard Agency Search and Rescue (SAR) helicopters. Currently the SAR centre in Fareham is named The Joint Rescue Coordination Centre (JRCC).

An urban renewal initiative began in 1999, renovating the town centre and historic buildings to include a new entertainment and shopping complex. It featured a major iron sculpture park installed in 2001 to celebrate the work of influential Lancastrian iron pioneer, Henry Cort, who lived in neighbouring Gosport but who had an iron rolling mill in Funtley (or Fontley), on the outskirts of Fareham.

== Arts and culture ==
Fareham was home to Ferneham Hall, a multi purpose venue with a capacity of over 700. The hall opened in 1982 and closed in 2020 to allow for renovation. Work on the remodel began in 2022, including rebranding the centre to Fareham Live. On 24 September 2024, it was officially opened by Fareham Borough Council and Trafalgar Theatres (a division of Trafalgar Entertainment).

The Ashcroft Arts Centre, on Osborn Road, was a 150-seat theatre which included, a gallery, a dance/music studio and a fully licensed bar. It offered a varied programme of events including films, theatre, comedy and workshops.

The pedestrianised area of West Street, in the town centre, is home to a permanent exhibition of the work of 12 blacksmith artists celebrating the achievements of Henry Cort, the 18th century 'man of iron' who pioneered the iron refining process at Funtley near Fareham. The puddled wrought iron sculptures are themed on Fareham's market town history and the exhibition is the largest of its type in Britain.

== Education ==
They have 1 college In Fareham College and in 2017, Fareham College was rated by OFSTED as "Outstanding". They have 3 main schools that serve the town in Fareham Academy, The Henry Cort Community College and Cams Hill School.

== Sport and leisure ==
Fareham has a non-League football club, Fareham Town F.C. which play in the Isthmian League South Central Division, but will play in the Wessex League Premier Division as they were relegated from the Isthmian League on 28 March.

== Transport ==
=== Road ===
The M27 motorway passes around the northern edge of the town, and is the main traffic artery into and out of the area. It provides rapid access to Portsmouth and Southampton, and from there to London via the M3 and A3(M).

The A27 was the original route along the south coast before the building of the M27, and runs from Brighton to Southampton, passing through the centre of Fareham. The A32 passes through Fareham at the Quay Street roundabout, a notorious bottleneck, on its way from Gosport to Wickham and through the Meon Valley to Alton.

Fareham was named the most car-dependent town in the UK by the Office for National Statistics in July 2014 with 538.7 cars registered to addresses in the town for every 1,000 residents.

=== Rail ===
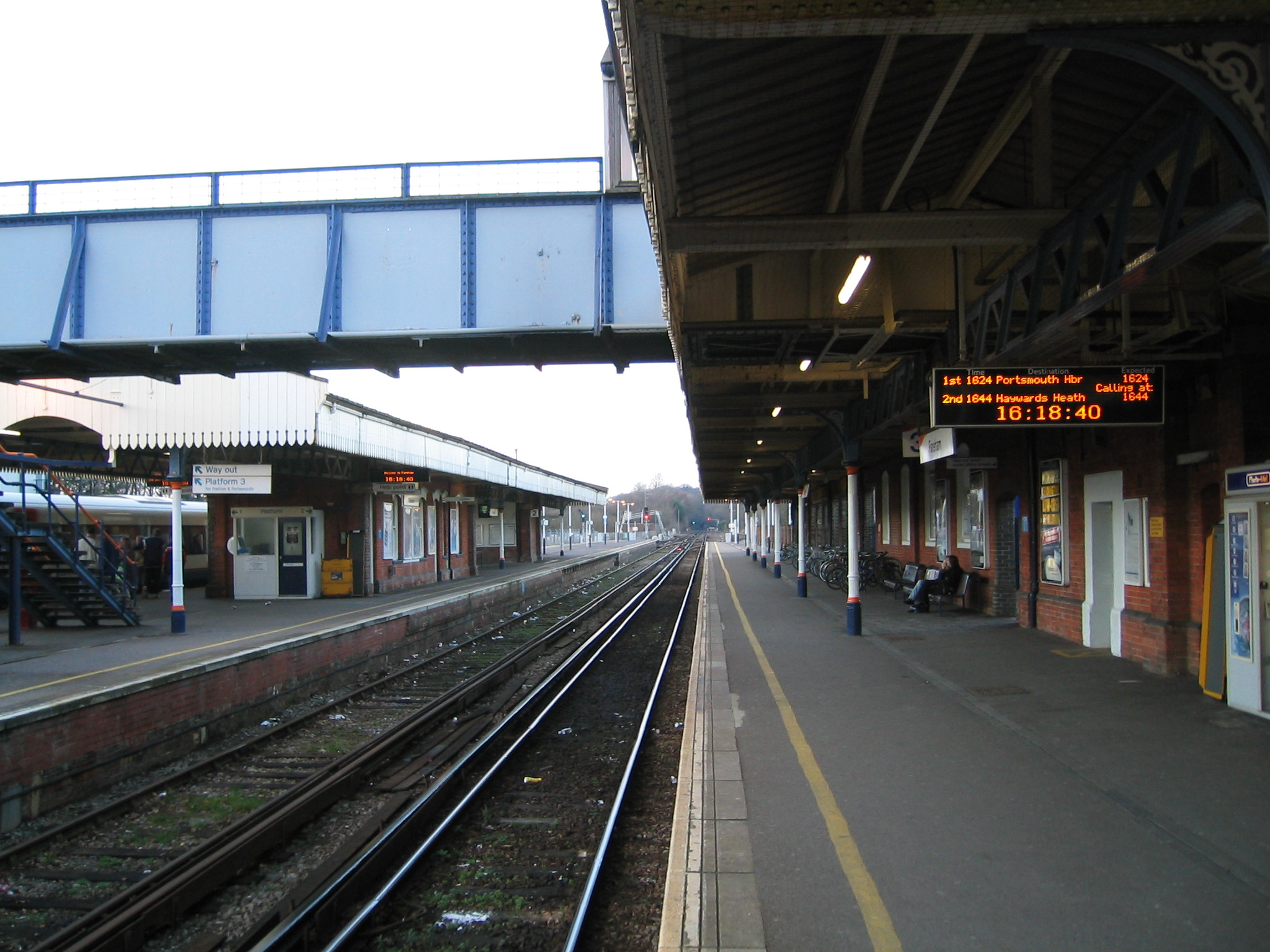
Fareham Railway Station

Fareham railway station is on the West Coastway Line, with regular services to Portsmouth, Southampton, Brighton, Cardiff and London. Passenger services also ran south to Gosport until 1953, and north along the Meon Valley to Alton until 1955. The station is approached from the east by two prominent viaducts, Cams Hill Viaduct and the Quay Street Viaduct, which are both prominent landmarks and Grade II listed buildings.

=== Bus ===
Bus services in the town are run by two operators. The first being First Portsmouth, Fareham & Gosport. Who runs services to the surrounding town’s and villages. The second operator is National Express Route 030 which starts in the town going to London.

== Places of interest ==
- Portchester Castle
- Titchfield Abbey and The Tithe Barn
- Westbury Manor Museum
- Fort Fareham
- Bursledon Brickworks Museum – the last surviving Victorian steam-powered brickworks
- Titchfield Canal – Britain's second-oldest human-made waterway
- Fareham High Street – historic Georgian buildings
- Fareham Shopping Centre – Medium-sized shopping centre
- Holly Hill Country Park – Local Nature Reserve

== Local media ==
Fareham is home to the local ITV franchise, covering the South and South-East of England, called ITV Meridian, based at Whiteley, with the BBC region being BBC South, based in Southampton. All BBC and ITV Services are available in Fareham, with transmissions from the Rowridge Transmitter on the Isle of Wight, although signals from the Hannington and Midhurst transmitting stations can be picked up from certain areas of the town. Also, the town is served by a local television station, named That's Solent, it was launched as part of a UK wide roll out of local Freeview channels, being broadcast from the Rowridge Transmitter.

The local commercial radio station is Greatest Hits Radio South on 105.2FM, also Heart South is based in the town, on 97.5FM, plus Capital South on 103.2FM, other radio stations based elsewhere serve Fareham, with Easy Radio South Coast on 107.4FM, BBC Radio Solent on 96.1FM and Nation Radio South Coast (formerly SAM FM) on 106.0FM, and Portsmouth based non-profit community radio station Express FM on 93.7FM.

The town has two daily local newspapers, the Southern Daily Echo and Portsmouth News, together with a free weekly newspaper, from the same publisher, Johnston Press, called Fareham View.

== Politics ==
=== Parliament ===
The current Member of Parliament for the Fareham and Waterlooville constituency is Suella Braverman for Reform UK, first elected as MP for Fareham in the 2015 UK General Election. Braverman is notable for being the shortest serving Home Secretary in British history during the Truss ministry, but was again reappointed as Home Secretary by Rishi Sunak on 25 October 2022.

=== Local government ===
Fareham is a part of the slightly larger Borough of Fareham local government district, with some local services provided by a non-metropolitan district council called Fareham Borough Council. Following the most recent elections to the council, the council's administration is currently made up of councillors from the Conservative Party which as of 2022 have a total of 12 councillors. The second largest party and therefore opposition on the council is the Liberal Democrats with 3 councillors.

Some local services are provided by the larger Hampshire County Council, with Fareham residents also able to participate in this Hampshire-wide (except Portsmouth and Southampton) election.

== Welborne ==
Welborne is a proposed new town to the north of the M27 at Fareham, intended to include 6,000 houses with businesses and community facilities.

The Planning Inspectorate Hearings into Welborne took place in 2014. Building is yet to start, with the completion date for the first houses now scheduled for 2023/24. On 6 June 2022 the Planning Inspectorate reported back on its examination of the 2037 Fareham Local Plan, and in the post-hearing letter noted that they considered completion of the first Welborne houses by 2023/24 to be "overly ambitious" and that "the site should be pushed back a year in the trajectory".

It was confirmed in October 2024 that funding to deliver critical infrastructure was now in place, and the announcement confirming the M27 Junction 10 improvements means all 6,000 new homes at Welborne can be built. The first phase lasts until 2028 which makes 700 houses in that time.

== Twin towns ==
Fareham is twinned with:

- Pulheim in Germany
- Vannes in France

== Notable residents ==
- Randal Cremer (1828–1908), Liberal Member of Parliament (MP) for Haggerston from 1885 to 1908, and the receiver of the Nobel Peace Prize in 1903 for his work with the international arbitration movement, was born and educated in Fareham.
- Sir Digby Dent RN (1739–1817) Rear Admiral
- Brendan O'Dowda, (1925–2002), an Irish tenor, lived in Fareham.
- Tom Oliver (1938 – ), actor who played Lou Carpenter in the Australian soap opera Neighbours, was born in Chandler's Ford and grew up in Fareham.
- Graham Roope (1946 – 2006), England cricketer, born in Fareham.
- Robert Goddard (1954 – ), English novelist, author of 26 novels, born and educated in Fareham.
- Steve Claridge (1966 – ), English football pundit, manager and former player grew up in Titchfield and started his career at Fareham Town.
- Andy Vernon (1986 – ), British long-distance runner was born in Fareham, and attended Cams Hill School.
- Anjali Mulari (1993 – ), New Zealand international ice and inline hockey player. Lived in Fareham while playing for the Solent Lizards at Solent Arena.

== See also ==
- List of places of worship in the Borough of Fareham
- Listed buildings in Fareham
