= Cams Hall =

Mansion in Hampshire, England

Coordinates: 50.8481°N 1.1642°W

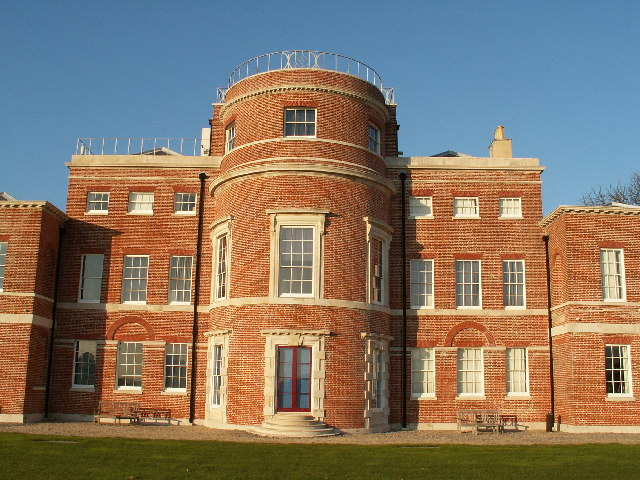
Cams Hall, 2005

Cams Hall at Fareham, Hampshire, United Kingdom, is a Palladian mansion set in parkland overlooking Portsmouth Harbour. The land at Cams Hall was mentioned in the Domesday Book of 1086 and a manor house was recorded here as far back as the 13th century.

The current building, designed by the architect Jacob Leroux, was constructed of Portland stone and yellow bricks around 1770.

Later adaptations to the house have been attributed to the famous Georgian architects the Adam Brothers. The building fell into disrepair in the 1950s and was listed as a derelict building in 1989 but was restored in the 1990s.

== History ==
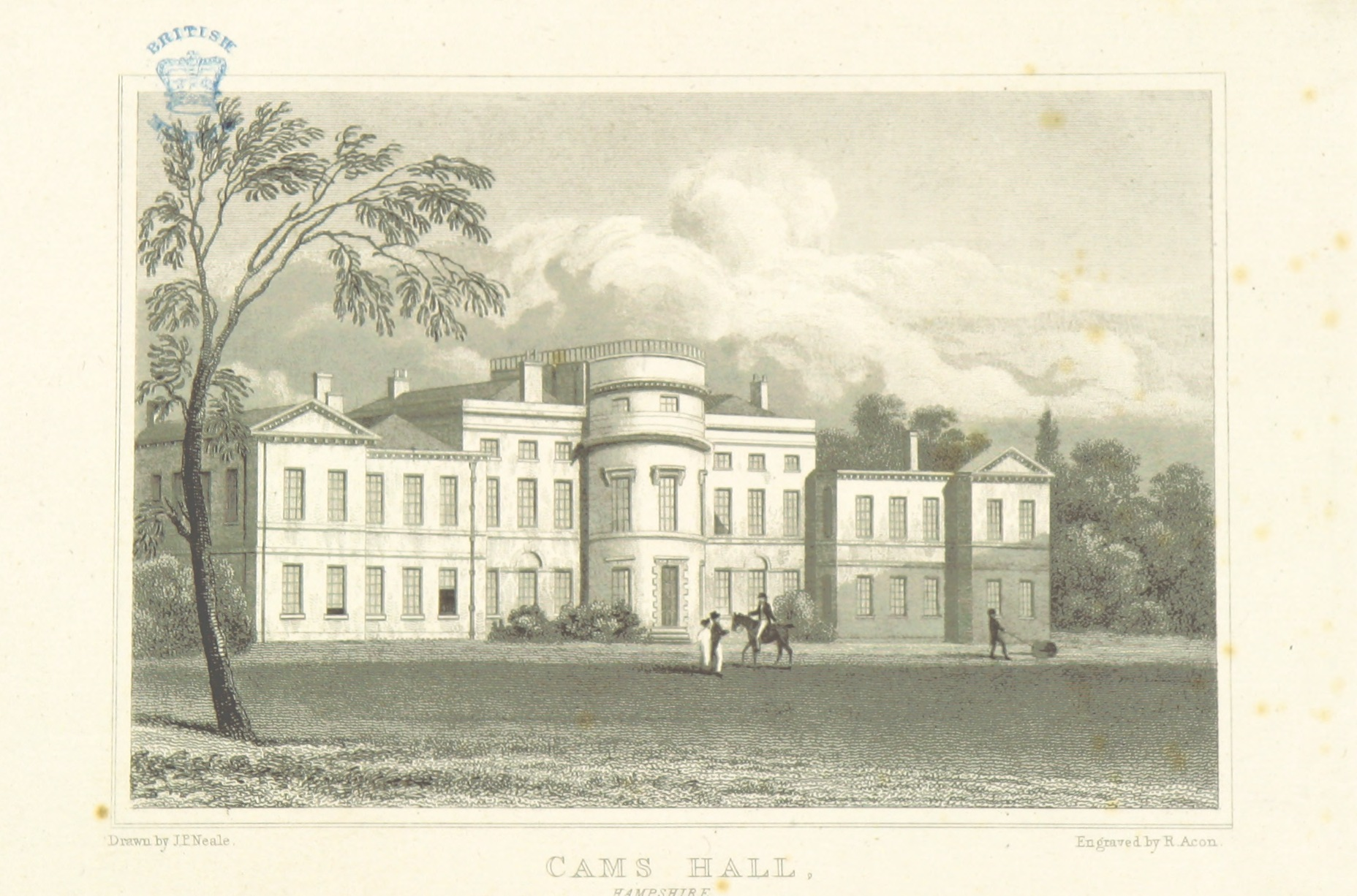
Cams Hall in an 1818 illustration by John Preston Neale

The land at Cams Hall was registered to Earl Godwin in the Domesday Book entry of 1086. Cams was the second great holding in Fareham belonging to the See of Winchester.

In the 12th century it was renamed Cammes Oysell by Robert Oysell whose family owned it until 1366. It then had a number of owners until it was bought by brothers William and Richard Ludlow, whose family owned it from around 1440. After the death of John Ludlow in 1583, his widow married Emmanuel Badd, High Sheriff of Hampshire, who is believed to have constructed a house on the estate around 1620. In 1632 the estate passed to his son, Thomas who rebuilt the house. Thomas Badd was created a baronet in 1642 in recognition of his services to the Crown in the Civil War. The house was recorded under the Hearth Tax Returns of 1665 as having 15 fireplaces.

The estate then had a succession of different owners and when it was again put up for sale in 1767 and purchased by Sir Jacob Wolff, it consisted of a manor, mansion house, farmhouse and 500 acres (2.0 km^{2}). Wolff made several changes before selling.

By 1770 Cams Hall was owned by Brigadier General Carnac, the MP for Leominster, who commissioned architect Jacob Leroux to design a new mansion for the estate. But by 1776 the estate with the recently built mansion was on the market for £17,000. The buyer was Peter Delmé, of Place House, a mansion converted from the 14th century monastery Titchfield Abbey on the other side of Fareham.

Delmé was the influential MP for Morpeth in Northumberland. He had close associations with the naval establishment and Emma Hamilton, mistress of Admiral Nelson, is alleged to have been a guest there during his time at Cams Hall. Delmé was married to Lady Elizabeth Howard, and he commissioned the artist Sir Joshua Reynolds to paint a picture of her and their children, to hang on the walls. The house was enlarged and lavishly remodelled by Delmé, using many materials from Place House, and his son John is believed to have commissioned the famous Scottish architect Robert Adam and his brothers to do further work on the house.

Cams Hall remained in the Delmé family for a century. In 1895 the last male heir sold the mansion, grounds and 256 acres (1.04 km^{2}) of agricultural land to Montague Foster of Stubbington House for £10,250. He let the property to tenants.

In World War II, the estate was requisitioned by the Admiralty, who occupied the building until 1948. In 1950 (14 July) the decline of Cams Hall began when the structure was heavily damaged by the explosion of ammunition barges at Bedenham pier in Portsmouth Harbour which destroyed the roof and blew out all of the windows, leaving it a ruined shell. It was sold in 1951 but left to deteriorate, and fireplaces and roof leading were stolen.

By the time it was bought by Charles Church in 1962, much damage had been sustained. Church had planned to restore it but his death in a plane crash meant that the house continued to decay until it was bought by Strand Harbour Securities and Warings of Portsmouth in 1991. A five-year, £4m restoration was completed in 1996 and the building became a company headquarters for a computer firm until in 2000 it was bought by the family-owned firm the Wilky Group.

== Architecture ==
Cams Hall is built mostly of fine Portland stone and yellow bricks. Its main facade is classical, with a central pediment. The south facing facade has vast bow windows to each floor. Jacob Leroux, the architect who designed the mansion, made his name chiefly through projects in Southampton but also in London. He was responsible for the York Buildings and the Polygon, a 12-sided arrangement of houses and public buildings designed for Clive of India which aimed to rival the Royal Crescent at Bath. Leroux is believed to have been a pupil to the designer of the East India Company buildings in London. Among his projects in London was the Prospect Place terrace of houses along the frontage to Old Brompton Road in Chelsea now demolished.

== Cams Hall today ==
Since 2000, Cams Hall has been under the ownership of The Wilky Group, offering modern office space, meeting rooms and corporate event spaces within the historic mansion. Cams Hall is also licensed for a select number of weddings on Saturdays and Sundays throughout the year.
