= The Henry Cort Community College =

Coordinates: 50.862°N 1.220°W

Henry Cort Community College

Location
- Hilson Drive; Fareham, Hampshire, PO15 6PH; England

Information
- Type: Community school
- Established: 1984
- Local authority: Hampshire
- Department for Education URN: 116466 Tables
- Ofsted: Reports
- Head teacher: Chris Rice
- Staff: 150
- Gender: Mixed
- Age: 11 to 16
- Enrolment: 864
- Houses: Invincible , Daring , Triumph , Victorious
- Colours: Navy Blue blazers, House Coloured Tie, and navy blue jumpers.
- Publication: Prospectuses
- Website: www.henry-cort.hants.sch.uk

The Henry Cort Community College, formerly Fareham Park Senior School, is a mixed sex comprehensive school in Fareham, Hampshire, England.

It is one of three comprehensive schools in Fareham, and had around 850 students at the last count. It has a sporting tradition, especially in field hockey, and has sports facilities, including an astroturf pitch and a gym. The school is named after the iron pioneer, Henry Cort.

== Environment ==
The college is set within a suburban 337-acre (1,360,000 m^{2}) site, on the edge of Fareham Park Estate of Fareham, with views over the Meon Valley and The Solent, on a clear day, you can see the Isle of Wight.

== Facilities ==
On 1 September 1984, as a result of the reorganisation of Fareham's Secondary Schools, Fareham Park School became Henry Cort Secondary School and later Henry Cort Community College.

The college has eleven fully networked ICT suites with over 400 computers linked to the internet; seminar rooms; a specialist Design Technology room, including an electronics Lab; a Food Technology kitchen; art and design rooms, including textiles; two sports halls; specialist language rooms; science laboratories, a learning resource centre; an all-weather pitch; and sizeable sports fields.

== Special Educational Needs ==
The college has a special education department, located in the Communications Block formally the William Makepeace Thackeray Building.
