= Bostock (surname) =

Bostock is a surname which originates from the Cheshire area. Ancient pedigrees claim that a Saxon thane named Osmer is the progenitor, though this is now doubted. Osmer's place of birth is not known but is likely to have been somewhere in Cheshire where he held a number of manors. He is alleged to have had a son named Hugh and a grandson named Richard. The first use of the surname was in the early 13th century with one Gilbert de Bostoc.

The surname originated from the place name in central Cheshire written as Botestoche in the Domesday Book. It is a compound of two Saxon words: Bota, which is likely to be a personal name, and stoc, which indicates a minor settlement or hamlet, perhaps surrounded by a stockade of tree stumps. Therefore, the original place-name means Bota's hamlet.

The surnames Bostick and Bostwick are variations of Bostock.

== People ==
Notable people with the surname include:

- Andy Bostock (born 1985), English rugby league footballer
- Barbara Bostock (born 1935), American actress
- Bridget Bostock (c. 1678–after 1749), English faith healer
- Billy Bostock (1943–1996), Scottish footballer
- Cecil Bostock (1884–1939), Australian photographer
- Chris Bostock (born 1962), English musician, songwriter and music producer
- Sir David Bostock (1948–2016), British diplomat
- David Bostock (philosopher) (1936–2019), British philosopher
- Douglas Bostock (born 1955), British classical music conductor
- Eliza Bostock (1817–1898), British educator promoter of women's education
- Euphemia Bostock (aka Phemie Bostock), Aboriginal Australian artist, involved with the National Black Theatre in Sydney in the 1970s
- Evalyn Bostock (1917–1944), English-American actress
- Frank C. Bostock (1866–1912), English entrepreneur and animal trainer
- Fred Bostock (1899–1948), British trade union leader
- Gerald Lynn Bostock (born 1964), the plaintiff in the landmark United States Supreme Court case Bostock v. Clayton County
- Gerry Bostock (1942–2014), Aboriginal Australian activist, playwright, poet and filmmaker
- Helen Bostock (born 1977), Australian oceanographer
- Herbert Bostock (1869–1954), English cricketer
- Hewitt Bostock (1864–1930), Canadian publisher, businessman and politician
- Hugh Bostock (born 1944), British neuroscientist
- Jack Bostock (born 2003), Australian rugby league footballer
- James Bostock (disambiguation), various people
- Jean Bostock (1922–1965), English table tennis and tennis player
- John Bostock (priest) (died 1786), Canon of Windsor
- John Bostock (physician) (1773–1846), British physician and geologist
- John Bostock (born 1992), English footballer
- Josh Bostock (born 1974), Australian former rugby league footballer
- Lionel Bostock (1888–1962), British Army officer and cricketer
- Lyman Bostock Sr. (1918–2005), American baseball player
- Lyman Bostock (1950–1978), American baseball player
- Matthew Bostock (born 1997), Manx cyclist
- Mike Bostock, American programmer and data-visualization specialist
- Nathan Bostock (born 1960), British banker
- Ollie Bostock (born 2007), Welsh footballer
- Peter Bostock (1911–1999), Anglican Archdeacon
- Robert Bostock (disambiguation), various people
- Roy J. Bostock, American businessman
- Stephen St. C. Bostock (1940–2023), British philosopher, zoologist and animal rights writer
- Thomas Edward Bostock, Australian politician
- Timothy Bostock (born 1966), English former cricketer
- William Bostock (1892–1968), Australian military commander and politician

== Fictional characters ==
- Gerald Bostock (born circa 1964), the fictional writer of the Jethro Tull album Thick as a Brick

== See also ==
- Bostick
- Bostwick (disambiguation)
