= Thomas Bostick =

Thomas Bostick may refer to:

- Thomas P. Bostick (born 1956), U.S. Army general
- Thomas G. Bostick Jr., U.S. Army officer killed in Afghanistan, for whom Forward Operating Base Bostick is named

== See also ==
- Thomas Edward Bostock, mayor of Geelong
