= Bostick (disambiguation) =

Bostick is a surname.

Bostick may also refer to:

== Places ==
=== United States ===
- Bostick, Texas, an unincorporated community
- Bostick School, a one-room schoolhouse near Ellerbe, North Carolina
- Bostick Female Academy, Triune, Tennessee
- Bostick State Prison, a former prison located in Hardwick in Baldwin County, Georgia

=== Elsewhere ===
- Forward Operating Base Bostick, a US military base in Afghanistan

== See also ==
- Florida v. Bostick, a US Supreme Court case
- Bostik, an international adhesives company
- Bostock (disambiguation)
