= Grade II* listed buildings in Waverley, Surrey =

Waverley shown within Surrey

There are over 20,000 Grade II* listed buildings in England. This page is a list of the 95 Grade II* listed buildings in the district of Waverley in Surrey. For similar lists in respect of the other ten districts of Surrey see Grade II* listed buildings in Surrey.

There are 95 Grade II* listed buildings in Waverley, with the largest number, 44, in the town of Farnham which is one of three towns in the district. Castle Street in Farnham has 17 Grade II* listed buildings, leading architectural historian Alec Clifton-Taylor to note that "for sheer visual delight, this street has few equals in all England".

Name	Location	Type	Completed (Note: The date given is the date used by Historic England as significant for the initial building or that of an important part in the structure's description.)	Date designated	Grid ref. (Note: Sometimes known as OSGB36, the grid reference is based on the British national grid reference system used by the Ordnance Survey.) Geo-coordinates	Entry number (Note: The "List Entry Number" is a unique number assigned to each listed building and scheduled monument by Historic England.)	Image
Alfold House	Alfold	House	17th century	9 March 1960	TQ0398034099; 51°05′48″N 0°30′59″W	1044391	Upload Photo
Alfold Stores & the Magnolias	Alfold	House	Late 19th century	28 September 1987	TQ0390734031; 51°05′46″N 0°31′03″W	1044392	Upload Photo
Church of St Andrew	Grafham	Church	1861-4	28 October 1986	TQ0229641659; 51°09′54″N 0°32′18″W	1249496	Church of St Andrew More images
East Manor House	Bramley	House	16th century LATER THAN c1540	9 March 1960	TQ0105644510; 51°11′27″N 0°33′19″W	1249485	East Manor House More images
The Church of Holy Trinity	Bramley	Church	Early 13th century	9 March 1960	TQ0087944907; 51°11′40″N 0°33′28″W	1044581	The Church of Holy Trinity More images
Barn 5 Yards South West of Skinners Land Farmhouse	Chiddingfold	Barn	19th century	17 June 1983	SU9682936372; 51°07′06″N 0°37′05″W	1248593	Upload Photo
Carriage House/Implement Shed 3 Yards South of Combe Court Farm	Chiddingfold	Dovecote	1882	17 June 1983	SU9416236107; 51°06′59″N 0°39′22″W	1248589	Carriage House/Implement Shed 3 Yards South of Combe Court Farm More images
Combe Court Farm	Chiddingfold	Hall House	15th century	17 June 1983	SU9416536127; 51°07′00″N 0°39′22″W	1277813	Upload Photo
Hadmans	Chiddingfold	House	16th century	9 March 1960	SU9621035564; 51°06′41″N 0°37′37″W	1044603	Hadmans More images
Lythe Hill Hotel	Chiddingfold	Farmhouse	15th century	9 March 1960	SU9241932494; 51°05′04″N 0°40′55″W	1277848	Lythe Hill Hotel More images
Pickhurst	Chiddingfold	House	Later alteration	17 June 1983	SU9670834144; 51°05′54″N 0°37′13″W	1248585	Pickhurst More images
Skinners Land Farmhouse	Chiddingfold	House	C20	9 March 1960	SU9682736389; 51°07′07″N 0°37′05″W	1277761	Upload Photo
The Crown Inn	Chiddingfold	House	Later alterations	9 March 1960	SU9605535366; 51°06′34″N 0°37′45″W	1044569	The Crown Inn More images
Church of St Nicholas	Cranleigh	Tower	14th century	9 March 1960	TQ0598639139; 51°08′30″N 0°29′11″W	1044371	Church of St Nicholas More images
Elstead Mill	Elstead	Mill House	16th century	9 March 1960	SU9035643832; 51°11′12″N 0°42′31″W	1044454	Elstead Mill More images
Church of St James	Westrook Hill, Elstead	Church	13th century	9 March 1960	SU9032943402; 51°10′58″N 0°42′32″W	1188415	Church of St James More images
Marylands	Hurtwood, Ewhurst	House	Between 1929 and 1931	10 May 1994	TQ0829242008; 51°10′01″N 0°27′09″W	1253713	Upload Photo
White Hart Cottage	Ewhurst	House	19th century	12 September 1972	TQ0906540749; 51°09′20″N 0°26′31″W	1044312	White Hart Cottage More images
Bethune House and Little House 88 and 88a West Street	Farnham	House	Late 18th century	26 April 1950	SU8364946735; 51°12′49″N 0°48′14″W	1243072	Bethune House and Little House 88 and 88a West Street More images
Castle Hill House 43 Castle Street	Farnham	House	Earlier	26 April 1950	SU8385447158; 51°13′03″N 0°48′03″W	1378286	Castle Hill House 43 Castle Street More images
1-2 Castle Street and 10 The Borough	Farnham	Inn	Modern	26 April 1950	SU8396446887; 51°12′54″N 0°47′57″W	1044679	1-2 Castle Street and 10 The Borough More images
73 and 74 Castle Street	Farnham	House	18th century	26 April 1950	SU8397146940; 51°12′56″N 0°47′57″W	1117389	73 and 74 Castle Street
Elmer House 41 West Street	Farnham	House	Late 18th century	26 April 1950	SU8354746652; 51°12′47″N 0°48′19″W	1259093	Elmer House 41 West Street More images
Garden Walls to Gardens East and North of the Grange	Farnham	Wall and gates	Early 18th century	29 December 1972	SU8359347409; 51°13′11″N 0°48′16″W	1242145	Garden Walls to Gardens East and North of the Grange More images
Guildford House 44 Castle Street	Farnham	House	Late 18th century	26 April 1950	SU8387647122; 51°13′02″N 0°48′02″W	1242416	Guildford House 44 Castle Street
Hewetts Farmhouse	Farnham	Farmhouse	16th century to 17th century	29 December 1972	SU8714847938; 51°13′26″N 0°45′12″W	1259919	Hewetts Farmhouse
Ivy House (Conservative Club)	Farnham	House	Later alteration	26 April 1950	SU8397546819; 51°12′52″N 0°47′57″W	1116718	Ivy House (Conservative Club)
Moor Park House	Farnham	House	17th century	26 April 1950	SU8621646529; 51°12′41″N 0°46′02″W	1319854	Moor Park House More images
5 and 5a Castle Street	Farnham	Stable/shop	Early to Mid 19th century	29 December 1972	SU8394346922; 51°12′55″N 0°47′58″W	1044681	5 and 5a Castle Street
67 and 68 Castle Street	Farnham	Shop	Late 18th century to Mid 19th century	26 April 1950	SU8394446991; 51°12′57″N 0°47′58″W	1044662	67 and 68 Castle Street
76 Castle Street	Farnham	House	Late 18th century	29 December 1972	SU8398346916; 51°12′55″N 0°47′56″W	1044622	76 Castle Street
35 and 36 The Borough	Farnham	House/Shop	1950	26 April 1950	SU8400646875; 51°12′54″N 0°47′55″W	1044666	35 and 36 The Borough
Sandford House 39 West Street	Farnham	House	18th century	26 April 1950	SU8357946670; 51°12′47″N 0°48′17″W	1258471	Sandford House 39 West Street More images
The Old Vicarage, Vicarage Lane	Farnham	House	16th century	26 April 1950	SU8384346614; 51°12′45″N 0°48′04″W	1273555	The Old Vicarage, Vicarage Lane More images
The Ranger's House, Farnham Park	Farnham Park, Farnham	Rangers House	18th century	26 April 1950	SU8414747892; 51°13′27″N 0°47′47″W	1378305	The Ranger's House, Farnham Park More images
40 The Borough	Farnham	House	C16-C17	26 April 1950	SU8398046866; 51°12′53″N 0°47′56″W	1044671	40 The Borough
Vernon House 28 West Street	Farnham	House	16th century	26 April 1950	SU8367346711; 51°12′49″N 0°48′12″W	1258122	Vernon House 28 West Street More images
Waverley Abbey House	Farnham	House	c. 1769	26 April 1950	SU8683345547; 51°12′09″N 0°45′31″W	1258221	Waverley Abbey House More images
Weybourne House	Farnham	House	1724	26 April 1950	SU8541448747; 51°13′54″N 0°46′41″W	1243152	Weybourne House
William Cobbett Public House 4 Bridge Square	Farnham	Timber Framed House	17th century	26 April 1950	SU8414846523; 51°12′42″N 0°47′48″W	1044674	William Cobbett Public House 4 Bridge Square More images
Windsor Almshouses 53–60 Castle Street	Farnham	Steps	1619	26 April 1950	SU8391047051; 51°12′59″N 0°48′00″W	1242457	Windsor Almshouses 53–60 Castle Street More images
70 Castle Street	Farnham	House	1775	26 April 1950	SU8395446969; 51°12′57″N 0°47′58″W	1044663	70 Castle Street
3 Downing Street	Farnham	House	1717	26 April 1950	SU8401146648; 51°12′46″N 0°47′55″W	1044634	3 Downing Street More images
62 Castle Street	Farnham	House	18th century	26 April 1950	SU8392947021; 51°12′58″N 0°47′59″W	1044660	62 Castle Street
9 Castle Street	Farnham	House	18th century	26 April 1950	SU8392446960; 51°12′56″N 0°47′59″W	1044683	9 Castle Street
45 Castle Street	Farnham	House	Early 18th century	26 April 1950	SU8388147106; 51°13′01″N 0°48′01″W	1044656	45 Castle Street More images
43 The Borough	Farnham	Shop	1932	26 April 1950	SU8396846856; 51°12′53″N 0°47′57″W	1044672	43 The Borough
48, 49 and 50 Downing Street	Farnham	Shop	Early 19th century	26 April 1950	SU8398046705; 51°12′48″N 0°47′57″W	1116966	48, 49 and 50 Downing Street
90 West Street	Farnham	House	18th century	26 April 1950	SU8367446745; 51°12′50″N 0°48′12″W	1243074	90 West Street More images
6 and 7 Castle Street	Farnham	Shop	19th century	26 April 1950	SU8393346937; 51°12′56″N 0°47′59″W	1242274	6 and 7 Castle Street More images
89 West Street	Farnham	House	Late 18th century	26 April 1950	SU8366446741; 51°12′50″N 0°48′13″W	1243073	89 West Street More images
10 Castle Street	Farnham	House	Early 18th century	26 April 1950	SU8390246961; 51°12′57″N 0°48′00″W	1260093	10 Castle Street More images
23 and 24 West Street	Farnham	House	1790	26 April 1950	SU8375746754; 51°12′50″N 0°48′08″W	1259743	23 and 24 West Street More images
104 West Street	Farnham	House	18th century	26 April 1950	SU8376846785; 51°12′51″N 0°48′07″W	1273042	104 West Street
91 and 92 West Street	Farnham	House	Late 18th century	26 April 1950	SU8368446750; 51°12′50″N 0°48′12″W	1273060	91 and 92 West Street
4 Downing Street	Farnham	House	c. 1800	26 April 1950	SU8399246653; 51°12′46″N 0°47′56″W	1378277	4 Downing Street
71 Castle Street	Farnham	House	Post 1772	26 April 1950	SU8396046958; 51°12′56″N 0°47′57″W	1117386	71 Castle Street More images
61 Castle Street	Farnham	House	Late 18th century	26 April 1950	SU8392147033; 51°12′59″N 0°47′59″W	1242623	61 Castle Street
12 and 13 Bridge Square	Farnham	House	Late 18th century	26 April 1950	SU8409946525; 51°12′42″N 0°47′51″W	1260235	12 and 13 Bridge Square
20, 20a and 21 West Street	Farnham	House	18th century	26 April 1950	SU8377546760; 51°12′50″N 0°48′07″W	1258391	20, 20a and 21 West Street
4 Castle Street	Farnham	Shop	Early 19th century	26 April 1950	SU8394846911; 51°12′55″N 0°47′58″W	1378260	4 Castle Street More images
Church of St Mary the Virgin	Frensham	Church	13th century	9 March 1960	SU8419141444; 51°09′58″N 0°47′50″W	1044427	Church of St Mary the Virgin More images
Pierrepont (Ellel Ministries)	Frensham	House	Earlier core	3 May 1973	SU8508942110; 51°10′19″N 0°47′03″W	1188515	Pierrepont (Ellel Ministries)
Chapel at Charterhouse School	Godalming	School Chapel	1927	16 January 1981	SU9649445015; 51°11′46″N 0°37′13″W	1352726	Chapel at Charterhouse School More images
Church of St John the Baptist	Busbridge	Church	1865-7	23 February 1970	SU9785542911; 51°10′37″N 0°36′05″W	1352706	Church of St John the Baptist More images
Busbridge War Memorial	Busbridge	War memorial	1922	1 February 1991	SU9781142958; 51°10′38″N 0°36′09″W	1044531	Busbridge War Memorial More images
74, 74A, 76 & 76A High Street (Costa Coffee at 74)	Godalming	Apartment/Shop	C20	18 December 1947	SU9699943845; 51°11′08″N 0°36′49″W	1293929	74, 74A, 76 & 76A High Street (Costa Coffee at 74) More images
Munstead Orchard	Busbridge	Timber Framed House	1894 AND 1895	11 September 1987	SU9798642835; 51°10′35″N 0°35′59″W	1294520	Upload Photo
The Red House	Godalming	House	1899	23 February 1970	SU9678244977; 51°11′45″N 0°36′59″W	1044519	Upload Photo
Westbrook	Westbrook, Godalming	Apartment	1991	9 December 1988	SU9611344264; 51°11′22″N 0°37′34″W	1299619	Westbrook More images
80, High Street	Godalming	House/Shop	Mid-Late 17th century	18 December 1947	SU9698043844; 51°11′08″N 0°36′50″W	1293899	80, High Street More images
99, 101 and 103 High Street	Godalming	Shops	C20	18 December 1947	SU9687443810; 51°11′07″N 0°36′55″W	1044526	99, 101 and 103 High Street More images
Vann	Hambledon	Farmhouse	AFTER 1520 BY 18th century	9 March 1960	SU9827137548; 51°07′44″N 0°35′49″W	1261120	Upload Photo
Church of St Peter	Hascombe	Church	1864	28 October 1986	TQ0018139542; 51°08′47″N 0°34′09″W	1240725	Church of St Peter More images
Amesbury School	Hindhead	House	1903	23 January 1973	SU8809834345; 51°06′06″N 0°44′35″W	1272562	Amesbury School More images
Branksome Conference Centre	Haslemere	Conference Centre	1901	19 September 1977	SU8850133512; 51°05′39″N 0°44′15″W	1244332	Branksome Conference Centre
Broad Dene	Haslemere	Gabled House	1900	11 August 1975	SU9010632629; 51°05′09″N 0°42′54″W	1244326	Broad Dene More images
Church Hill House	Haslemere	House	Early 18th century	3 December 1953	SU9031433386; 51°05′34″N 0°42′42″W	1243900	Church Hill House More images
Kemnal	Haslemere	Gabled House	1888	19 September 1977	SU9081033397; 51°05′34″N 0°42′17″W	1243908	Upload Photo
The White House	Grayswood, Haslemere	House	1930	28 January 1971	SU9186334859; 51°06′20″N 0°41′21″W	1244056	Upload Photo
Town House	Haslemere	House	18th century	3 December 1953	SU9056833075; 51°05′23″N 0°42′29″W	1244318	Town House More images
Tudor House	Haslemere	Timber Framed House	Early 17th century	3 January 1953	SU9002732999; 51°05′21″N 0°42′57″W	1272369	Tudor House More images
Barn to North West Corner of Home Farm Courtyard	Peper Harow Park, Peper Harow	Courtyard	Early 18th century	2 January 1986	SU9344044210; 51°11′22″N 0°39′52″W	1188816	Barn to North West Corner of Home Farm Courtyard
Church of St Nicholas	Peper Harow Park, Peper Harow	Church	12th century	9 March 1960	SU9346544062; 51°11′17″N 0°39′50″W	1352737	Church of St Nicholas More images
Dovecot and Granary to South West of Home Farm Courtyard	Peper Harow Park, Peper Harow	Dovecote	18th century	2 January 1986	SU9343044162; 51°11′21″N 0°39′52″W	1044441	Dovecot and Granary to South West of Home Farm Courtyard More images
Home Farm Cottages with Stables to Left and Buildings to East	Peper Harow	House	18th century	2 January 1986	SU9348144198; 51°11′22″N 0°39′49″W	1352736	Home Farm Cottages with Stables to Left and Buildings to East More images
Somerset Bridge	Peper Harow	Bridge	13th century	9 March 1960	SU9217743926; 51°11′14″N 0°40′57″W	1188935	Somerset Bridge More images
Tilford House	Tilford	House	c. 1700	9 March 1960	SU8699843596; 51°11′06″N 0°45′24″W	1352763	Tilford House More images
Barn at Oxenford Grange	Witley	Barn	1843	9 March 1960	SU9323143217; 51°10′50″N 0°40′03″W	1334359	Barn at Oxenford Grange More images
Granary and Farm Buildings at Oxenford Farm	Witley	Farm Building	1843	28 October 1986	SU9320543244; 51°10′51″N 0°40′05″W	1097014	Upload Photo
Oxenford Gate Lodge	Witley	Gate Lodge	1843-4	9 March 1960	SU9318343238; 51°10′51″N 0°40′06″W	1096948	Oxenford Gate Lodge More images
Statue of Neptune with Attached Underwater Tunnel, Stairs, Circular and Rectangular Chambers and Artificial Island, Witley Park	Witley Park, Witley	Steps	c. 1900	28 October 1986	SU9217139560; 51°08′52″N 0°41′01″W	1096871	Statue of Neptune with Attached Underwater Tunnel, Stairs, Circular and Rectangular Chambers and Artificial Island, Witley Park
Barnett Hill (Conference Centre)	Wonersh	House	c. 1905	28 October 1986	TQ0243145442; 51°11′56″N 0°32′07″W	1241148	Barnett Hill (Conference Centre)
Church of St John the Baptist	Wonersh	Church	Pre Conquest	9 March 1960	TQ0146445098; 51°11′46″N 0°32′57″W	1241510	Church of St John the Baptist More images
The Dower House	Wonersh	House	c. 1710	9 March 1960	TQ0182745235; 51°11′50″N 0°32′39″W	1241146	Upload Photo

== See also ==
- Grade I listed buildings in Surrey (Waverley)
