= Bostick =

Bostick is a surname, a variation of the English surname Bostock. Notable people with the surname include:

- Akeem Bostick (born 1995), American minor league baseball player
- Brandon Bostick (born 1989), American National Football League player
- Chris Bostick (born 1993), American minor league baseball player
- Devon Bostick (born 1991), Canadian actor
- Francis Bostick, American engineer and professor emeritus
- Henry Bostick (1895–1968), American Major League Baseball player born Henry Lipschitz
- Sion Record Bostick (1819–1902), veteran of the Texas Revolution
- Th-resa Bostick (born 1969), IFBB professional bodybuilder
- Thomas P. Bostick (born 1956), American retired lieutenant general, former Chief of Engineers of the US Army and commanding general of the US Army Corps of Engineers
- Winston H. Bostick (1916–1991), American physicist

== See also ==
- Bostock (disambiguation)
