= Churchill House =

Churchill House may refer to the following buildings:

- Churchill House, Chester, a 1938 building located in Chester, England
- Churchill House, Hantsport, a 1860 historic building located in Hantsport, Nova Scotia, Canada
- Churchill House (Plymouth, Massachusetts), a 17th-century historic building located in Plymouth, Massachusetts, United States
- Church Hill House, Haslemere, Surrey, England
- The Endwood, Birmingham, West Midlands, England, formerly called "Church Hill House"
