= David Bostock =

David Bostock may refer to:

- David Bostock (diplomat) (1948–2016), British diplomat
- David Bostock (philosopher) (1936–2019), British philosopher
