= Bowstock =

Bowstock may refer to:

- St Barnabas Community Fete (Bowstock), annual festival in Bow, London
- Bostock (disambiguation)
