= Pickhurst =

- Location within Surrey
- 51°05′54″N 0°37′13″W
- Type: Mansion
- Location: Chiddingfold, Surrey
- OS grid reference: SU 96708 34144

History
- Built: 1885–1889

Site notes
- Architect: J. M. Brydon

Listed Building – Grade II*
- Official name: Pickhurst
- Designated: 17 June 1983
- Reference no.: 1248585

Pickhurst is a grade II* listed house set in 130 acres (53 ha) of land near Chiddingfold, Surrey, England.

== History ==
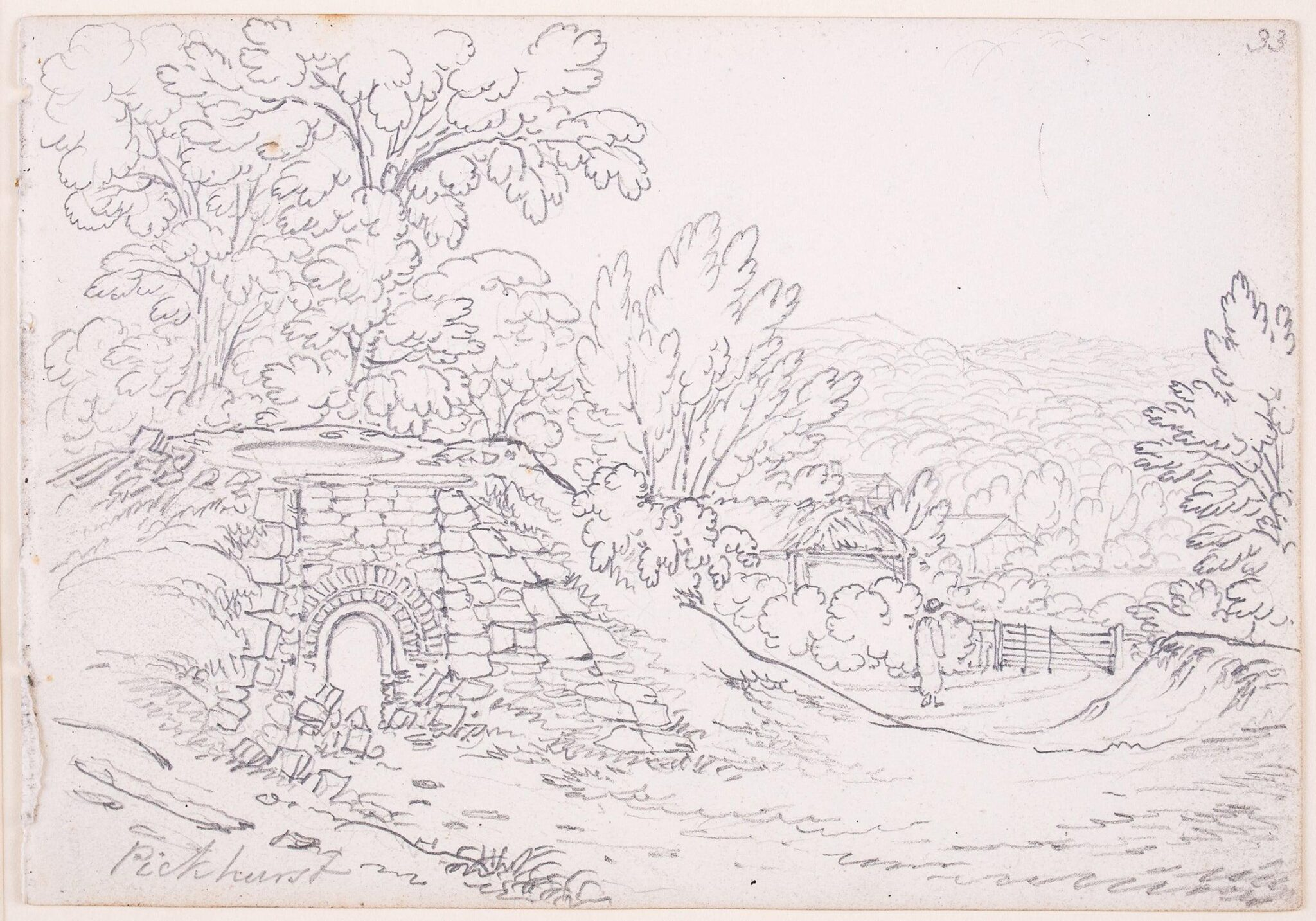
Sketch made at Pickhurst by James Bourne, circa 1820

It was designed by the Scottish architect J.M. Brydon in 1885 as his own home. The design was influenced by the style of Norman Shaw. In the 1950s a fire badly damaged the original service wing and internal courtyard necessitating their demolition. The building subsequently underwent a six-year renovation by Ian Adam-Smith.

== See also ==
- Grade II* listed buildings in Waverley, Surrey
