= List of forward operating bases =

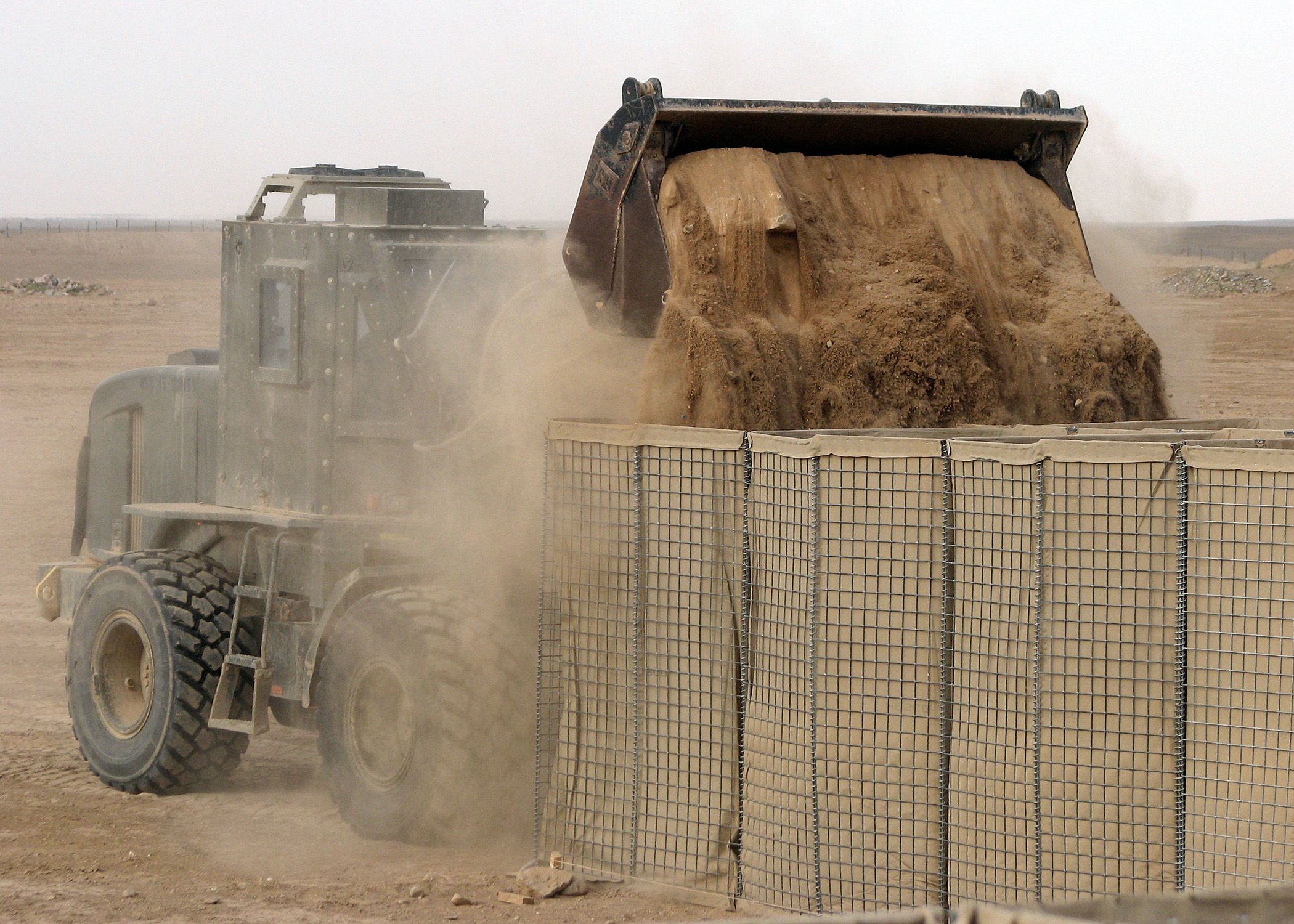
A front end loader filling HESCO barriers during a project at Camp Bastion

This is a list of Forward operating bases.

A forward operating base (FOB) is any secured forward military position, commonly a military base, that is used to support tactical operations. A FOB may or may not contain an airfield, hospital, or other facilities. The base may be used for an extended period of time. FOBs are traditionally supported by Main Operating Bases that are required to provide backup support to them. A FOB also improves reaction time to local areas as opposed to having all troops on the main operating base.

In its most basic form, a FOB consists of a ring of barbed wire around a position with a fortified entry control point, or ECP. More advanced FOBs include an assembly of earthen dams, concrete barriers, gates, watchtowers, bunkers and other force protection infrastructure. They are often built from Hesco bastions.

== FOBs in the United States ==
As of 2017, the U.S. Border Patrol operated 17 forward operating bases—12 permanent FOBs and 5 temporary camps—along the U.S.-Mexico border. Five of the nine southwestern Border Patrol sectors—Yuma, Tucson, El Paso, Big Bend, and the Rio Grande Valley—have FOBs; the remaining four—San Diego, El Centro, Del Rio, and Laredo—do not. These include:

- Wellton Station Forward Operating Base (FOB): Camp Grip (also known as Desert Grip FOB), located within the Cabeza Prieta National Wildlife Refuge (CPNWR) along El Camino Del Diablo in Yuma County, Arizona. This FOB falls within the U.S. Border Patrol's Yuma Sector, and is located 3.8 miles north of the U.S.-Mexico border, approximately 34 miles southwest of Ajo, Pima County, Arizona, and 55 miles southeast of Tacna, Yuma County, Arizona. It was originally established as a tactical camp in 2002 through Operation Desert Grip, which was a joint U.S. Border Patrol operation conducted by the Yuma Sector/Wellton Station & Yuma Sector Border Patrol Search, Trauma, and Rescue (BORSTAR) team and Tucson Sector/Ajo Station.
- Papago Farms FOB, Sells, Arizona
- San Miguel Law Enforcement Center on the Tohono O'odham Nation in Arizona. Located south of San Miguel on Indian Route 19 / San Miguel Rd about two miles north of the US/Mexico border at 31.583779, -111.770689, this FOB is a joint command center for the US Border Patrol and the Tohono O'odham Police Department. It began operating in 2004.
- FOB Cannon, Yuma, Arizona
- Hedglen FOB, east of Douglas, Cochise County, Arizona. This is a U.S. Border Patrol (Tucson Sector) forward operating base located at 31.371333, -109.210222, on a site near the intersection of Guadalupe Canyon Rd and Geronimo Trail that local ranchers call Floyd Pocket. The site was originally proposed by a local landowner group called Malpai Borderlands Group. It has 32 beds, vehicles, a fueling station, horse stables, a helipad, and a detention facility. It has been in operation since May 2013, and was initially approved and funded through the 2010 Emergency Border Security Supplement Act.
- USBP Forward Operating Base, Luna County, New Mexico. This FOB operates within the area of responsibility of the El Paso Sector's Deming Station.
- USBP Forward Operating Base, Hidalgo County, New Mexico. Located off Klump Rd. at 31.619222, -108.886889. The site for this FOB was announced by the Border Patrol in January 2012.
- Camp Bounds Forward Operating Base, Antelope Wells, Hidalgo County, New Mexico. This is a U.S. Border Patrol forward operating base adjacent to the Antelope Wells port of entry; it is located at 31.336030, -108.529820. The FOB can house up to 16 agents, but the number residing at the base varies.
- FOB Border Wolf, Deming, Luna County, New Mexico. This FOB was used as a staging area for U.S. National Guard soldiers deployed along the U.S.-Mexico border as part of Operation Jump Start between 2006-2008. It is unclear whether this FOB is still in operation today.
- FOB near Lordsburg, New Mexico.

The Texas Department of Public Safety and the Texas Military Department have also constructed forward operating bases in Texas as part of Operation Lone Star. In 2022, a joint investigation by the Military Times (part of Sightline Media Group) and the Texas Tribune called the living conditions for many of the National Guard troops housed on these bases "deplorable". Troops interviewed for the investigation reported cramped and substandard accommodations, problems that Texas Military Department leadership attributed to the speed and scale of Operation Lone Star. These FOBs include:

- Forward Operation Base Camp Eagle, Eagle Pass, Texas. According to Texas governor Greg Abbott, the base will enable the state to permanently “amass a large army in a strategic area." The facility began operating in May 2024, and is designed to house at least 1,800 Texas National Guard soldiers. The cost to build and operate the base over the first eight months was $171 million, paid to Team Housing Solutions, a private contractor. After that initial period, the state has the option to extend the base's operation for each of the following two years. According to the Texas Observer, those "two extensions would cost Texas taxpayers $350 million on top of the original $171 million—bringing the possible total to over half a billion dollars". A local advocacy group, the Eagle Pass Border Coalition, has voiced concern that the 80-acre base's location next to a sewage treatment plant and a concrete plant could expose soldiers stationed there to health risks.
- Camp Walker (Texas Military Department FOB), Laredo, Texas. Located at 27.377703, -99.471835. Opened in October 2021. Built and operated by Team Housing Solutions.
- Camp Amistad (Texas Military Department FOB), Del Rio, Texas.
- Camp Swift (Texas Military Department FOB), Del Rio, Texas.
- National Guard Base Camp Kelly, Zapata, Texas. Located at 26.890035, -99.284931.

Other FOBs located in the United States but not operated by the U.S. Border Patrol include:

- Sea-Based X-Band Radar FOB, Adak, Alaska

FOBs and base camps located in the U.S. and operated by the U.S. military for training purposes include:

- FOB Sentinel, Goodfellow Air Force Base, Texas. This is an imitation FOB used by the U.S. Army to train soldiers for deployments in Iraq and Afghanistan.
- Doña Ana Base Camp, near Chaparral, Otero and Doña Ana Counties, New Mexico. Located at 32.145833, -106.506111 on the Doña Ana Range Complex, which is part of Fort Bliss Training Center at Fort Bliss. Used for training by the U.S. Army.
- McGregor Base Camp, near Alvarado, Otero County, New Mexico. Located at 32.080557483526924, -106.17666465823983 on the McGregor Range Complex, which is part of Fort Bliss Training Center at Fort Bliss. Used for training of U.S. National Guard soldiers.
- Orogrande Base Camp, Otero County, New Mexico. Located on the Orogrande Range Complex, which is part of Fort Bliss Training Center at Fort Bliss. Used for training by the U.S. Army.
- Westbrook Forward Operating Base/Westbrook Base Camp, near Alvarado, Otero County, New Mexico. Located at 32.0330548595103, -106.15268814858258, and part of Fort Bliss. Used for training by the U.S. Army.
- FOB Mailfoot, Fort Benning, Georgia

== See also ==
- Advance airfield
- Advanced landing ground
- Fire support base
- Forward operating site
- Loss-of-strength gradient
- Main operating base
