= Grade II* listed buildings in Woking (district) =

Woking shown within Surrey

There are over 20,000 Grade II* listed buildings in England. This page is a list of the 19 Grade II* listed buildings in the district of Woking in Surrey. For links to similar articles in relation to the other 10 districts of Surrey see Grade II* listed buildings in Surrey.

Name	Location	Type	Completed (Note: The date given is the date used by Historic England as significant for the initial building or that of an important part in the structure's description.)	Date designated	Grid ref. (Note: Sometimes known as OSGB36, the grid reference is based on the British national grid reference system used by the Ordnance Survey.) Geo-coordinates	Entry number (Note: The "List Entry Number" is a unique number assigned to each listed building and scheduled monument by Historic England.)	Image
Manor House and Manorside West	Byfleet	House	Earlier-Pre 1686	22 July 1953	TQ0711660280; 51°19′54″N 0°27′50″W	1236613	Manor House and Manorside West More images
Watermill 10m from the Mill House	Byfleet	Watermill	Mid 18th century	22 July 1953	TQ0728860684; 51°20′06″N 0°27′41″W	1236612	Upload Photo
Chapel of the Former Convent of St Peter	Woking	Chapel	1898-1900	25 October 1990	TQ0199058918; 51°19′13″N 0°32′16″W	1264347	Chapel of the Former Convent of St Peter More images
Church of St Mary the Virgin	Horsell	Church	15th century	22 July 1953	SU9971459154; 51°19′22″N 0°34′13″W	1044720	Church of St Mary the Virgin More images
Fishers Farm House	Woking	Farmhouse	15th century	6 January 1984	TQ0136655915; 51°17′36″N 0°32′51″W	1044716	Upload Photo
Hoe Place	Old Woking	House	Early 18th century	22 July 1953	TQ0207757572; 51°18′29″N 0°32′13″W	1044695	Hoe Place
Littlecourt	Woking	House	1902	29 April 1980	TQ0302459376; 51°19′27″N 0°31′22″W	1236744	Upload Photo
The Old Manor House	Old Woking	House	17th century	22 July 1953	TQ0182456906; 51°18′08″N 0°32′27″W	1044692	Upload Photo
Tomb of Lord Edward Pelham-Clinton (1836–1907)	Brookwood Cemetery	Tomb	1892	23 July 2004	SU9596256477; 51°17′58″N 0°37′30″W	1391044	Tomb of Lord Edward Pelham-Clinton (1836–1907) More images
Whitfield Court	Woking	House	18th century	30 March 1979	SU9713959280; 51°19′28″N 0°36′26″W	1236585	Whitfield Court More images
