= J. M. Brydon =

Scottish architect

John McKean Brydon (1840 – 25 May 1901) was a Scottish architect who developed a practice in designing public buildings, particularly hospitals, in London. He designed the St Peter's Hospital in Henrietta Street, Covent Garden (1880–84), the Hospital for Women in Euston Road (renamed the Elizabeth Garrett Anderson Hospital after the death of its founder), Chelsea Public Library (1890), and the London School of Medicine for Women in Huntley Street (1896). He also designed the Old Vestry Hall at the rear of the Chelsea Town Hall on King's Road, as well as the Government Offices Great George Street, which today house the Treasury, HM Revenues and Customs and part of the Cabinet Office.

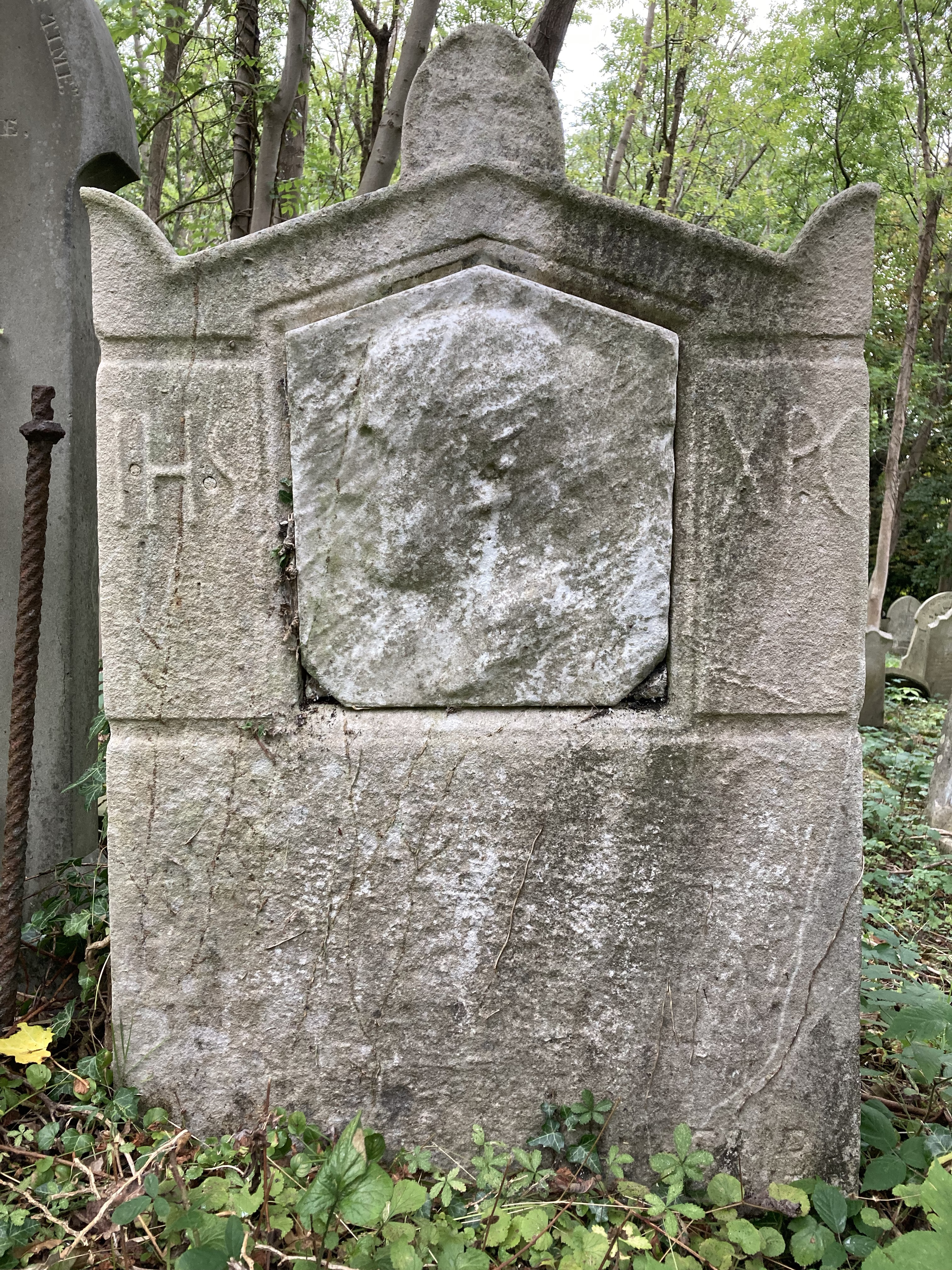
Grave of John Brydon in Highgate Cemetery

From 1871 he employed Agnes Garrett and Rhoda Garrett as apprentices, giving them an entry into training that no other practice was willing to allow, as architecture was not considered suitable for women. The two cousins became the first British women to open an interior design business.

Brydon was the author of the entry on William Eden Nesfield in the 1911 Encyclopædia Britannica.

He died at his Hampstead home, 31 Steeles Road, NW3 on 25 May 1901 and was buried on the eastern side of Highgate Cemetery (plot no.24272).

== Works ==
- 1870 31 Steeles Road, Belsize Park, London (for himself)
- 1873-74 44 Grove End Road, St John's Wood. Studio for artist Jacques Joseph Tissot (later home of Lawrence Alma-Tadema)
- 1881-82 St Peter's Hospital, 27 Henrietta Street, London
- 1885 Pickhurst, Pickhurst Road, Chiddingfold, Surrey (for himself)
- 1885-87 Chelsea Vestry/Town Hall, Chelsea Manor Gardens, Chelsea
- 1889-90 Chelsea Public Library (now part of Chelsea College), Manresa Road, Chelsea
- 1888-89 Ladies' Residential Chambers, Chenies Street, Bloomsbury, London
- 1889-90 New Hospital for Women, Euston Road, London
- 1890 1st Aldeburgh Golf Clubhouse, Aldeburgh (destroyed by fire in 1910)
- 1891 South Western Polytechnic, Manresa Road, Chelsea
- 1895 Château de Buillon, Besançon, France, extension and alterations for the painter James Tissot
- 1893-96 Guildhall north and south wing extensions, Bath
- 1897-1900 Victoria Art Gallery and library, Bath
- 1896 Extension of Ladies' Residential Chambers, Huntley Street, Bloomsbury, London
- 1896-98 School of Medicine for Women, Huntley Street, London
- 1898-1900 Government offices, Great George Street/Parliament Square/Whitehall – designs only
