= Grade II* listed buildings in Epsom and Ewell =

Epsom and Ewell shown within Surrey

There are over 20,000 Grade II* listed buildings in England. This page is a list of the 17 Grade II* listed buildings in the district of Epsom and Ewell in Surrey. For links to similar articles in relation to the other 10 districts of Surrey see Grade II* listed buildings in Surrey.

Name	Location	Type	Completed (Note: The date given is the date used by Historic England as significant for the initial building or that of an important part in the structure's description.)	Date designated	Grid ref. (Note: Sometimes known as OSGB36, the grid reference is based on the British national grid reference system used by the Ordnance Survey.) Geo-coordinates	Entry number (Note: The "List Entry Number" is a unique number assigned to each listed building and scheduled monument by Historic England.)	Image
Ashley House	Epsom	House	Dated 1769	10 April 1954	TQ2081160675; 51°19′56″N 0°16′02″W	1289636	Upload Photo
Christ Church	Epsom Common	Church	1876	22 March 1974	TQ1954660880; 51°20′04″N 0°17′07″W	1289540	Christ Church More images
Curved Colonnades, Entrance Steps, Outer Pavilions of Woodcote Park (old House), Woodcote Park	Woodcote Park	House	Underway in 1753	10 April 1954	TQ2028958769; 51°18′55″N 0°16′31″W	1288718	Curved Colonnades, Entrance Steps, Outer Pavilions of Woodcote Park (old House), Woodcote Park More images
Ebbisham House	Epsom		Early 18th century	10 April 1954	TQ2133360425; 51°19′48″N 0°15′35″W	1378229	Ebbisham House
Forecourt Rails to Hylands House & Hylands House	Epsom	House	c. 1740	10 April 1954	TQ2022659907; 51°19′32″N 0°16′33″W	1044740	Upload Photo
Garden Wall to Green Anne House, Queen Anne House & Woodcote End House	Epsom and Ewell	House	Late C17-early 18th century	10 April 1954	TQ2067759971; 51°19′34″N 0°16′10″W	1288644	Upload Photo
The Durdans	Epsom and Ewell	House	1764	10 January 1974	TQ2078059452; 51°19′17″N 0°16′05″W	1378221	The Durdans More images
Gates to the Durdans on Chalk Lane	Epsom and Ewell	Gate	Early 18th century	10 April 1954	TQ2089659517; 51°19′19″N 0°15′59″W	1378222	Gates to the Durdans on Chalk Lane
Riding School at the Durdans	Epsom and Ewell	Riding School	1881	10 January 1974	TQ2085759581; 51°19′21″N 0°16′01″W	1378224	Riding School at the Durdans More images
Nonsuch Park House	Nonsuch Park	Country House	1802-1806	10 April 1954	TQ2342663611; 51°21′29″N 0°13′43″W	1378198	Nonsuch Park House More images
Parish Church of St Martin	Epsom and Ewell	Parish Church	c. 1450	10 April 1954	TQ2139560522; 51°19′51″N 0°15′32″W	1028592	Parish Church of St Martin More images
The Cedars	Epsom	House	late C17-early 18th century	10 April 1954	TQ2121660598; 51°19′54″N 0°15′41″W	1378227	Upload Photo
The Hylands, Including Forecourt Walls, Piers, Clairvoyee and Gates	Epsom and Ewell	House	Mid 18th century	10 April 1954	TQ2025259943; 51°19′33″N 0°16′32″W	1044739	Upload Photo
Woodcote Green House	Epsom and Ewell	House	Late 17th century	10 April 1954	TQ2066759851; 51°19′30″N 0°16′11″W	1214289	Upload Photo
Woodcote Grove	Epsom and Ewell	House	Late 17th century	10 April 1954	TQ2083059762; 51°19′27″N 0°16′02″W	1028576	Woodcote Grove
149–153 High Street	Epsom and Ewell	Tenement House	C20	10 April 1954	TQ2062460705; 51°19′58″N 0°16′12″W	1213183	149–153 High Street More images
127 and 129 High Street	Epsom and Ewell	House	Late 18th century	10 April 1954	TQ2070860725; 51°19′58″N 0°16′07″W	1213163	Upload Photo
