= Grade II* listed buildings in Surrey Heath =

Surrey Heath shown within Surrey

There are over 20,000 Grade II* listed buildings in England. This page is a list of the five Grade II* listed buildings in the district of Surrey Heath in Surrey. For links to similar articles in relation to the other 10 districts of Surrey see Grade II* listed buildings in Surrey.

Name	Location	Type	Completed (Note: The date given is the date used by Historic England as significant for the initial building or that of an important part in the structure's description.)	Date designated	Grid ref. (Note: Sometimes known as OSGB36, the grid reference is based on the British national grid reference system used by the Ordnance Survey.) Geo-coordinates	Entry number (Note: The "List Entry Number" is a unique number assigned to each listed building and scheduled monument by Historic England.)	Image
44 High Street	Bagshot	Office	16th century	17 April 1998	SU9116363331; 51°21′42″N 0°41′31″W	1135187	Upload Photo
Church of St John the Baptist	Bisley	Church	13th century	28 February 1955	SU9578759592; 51°19′39″N 0°37′36″W	1030064	Church of St John the Baptist More images
Clews Farm House	Bisley	Farmhouse	17th century	28 February 1955	SU9551059448; 51°19′34″N 0°37′50″W	1030065	Upload Photo
Brook Place	West End	House	1656	28 February 1955	SU9560461716; 51°20′47″N 0°37′43″W	1189769	Upload Photo
Benjamins Mount and attached Steps	Windlesham	House	1967-1969	11 January 1999	SU9419965265; 51°22′43″N 0°38′52″W	1245054	Upload Photo
