= Saliva =

Bodily fluid secreted by salivary glands

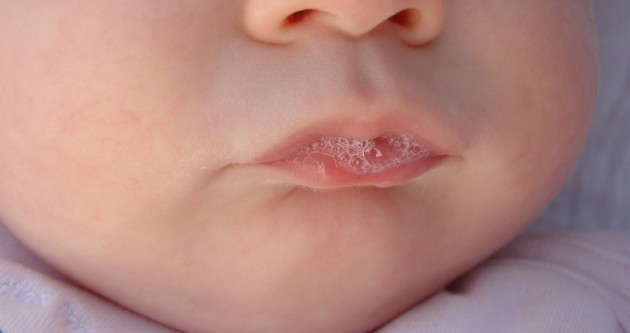
Saliva on a baby's lips

Saliva (commonly referred to as spit, drool or slobber) is an extracellular fluid produced and secreted by salivary glands in the mouth. In humans, saliva is around 99% water, plus electrolytes, mucus, white blood cells, epithelial cells (from which DNA can be extracted), enzymes (such as amylase), and antimicrobial agents (such as secretory IgA, and lysozymes).

The enzymes found in saliva are essential in beginning the process of digestion of dietary starches. These enzymes also play a role in breaking down food particles trapped within dental crevices, thus protecting teeth from bacterial decay. Saliva also performs a lubricating function, wetting food and permitting the initiation of swallowing, and protecting the oral mucosa from drying out.

Saliva has specialized purposes for a variety of animal species beyond predigestion. Certain swifts construct nests with their sticky saliva, such as Aerodramus, whose nest is consumed by humans as bird's nest soup. Venomous saliva injected by fangs is used by cobras, vipers, and certain other members of the venom clade to hunt. Some caterpillars use modified salivary glands to store silk proteins, which they then use to make silk fiber.

== Composition ==
Produced in salivary glands, human saliva comprises 99.5% water, but also contains many important substances, including electrolytes, mucus, antibacterial compounds, and various enzymes. Medically, constituents of saliva can noninvasively provide important diagnostic information related to oral and systemic diseases.

- Water: 99.5%
- Electrolytes:
  - 2–21 mmol/L sodium (lower than blood plasma)
  - 10–36 mmol/L potassium (higher than plasma)
  - 1.2–2.8 mmol/L calcium (similar to plasma)
  - 0.08–0.5 mmol/L magnesium
  - 5–40 mmol/L chloride (lower than plasma)
  - 25 mmol/L bicarbonate (higher than plasma)
  - 1.4–39 mmol/L phosphate
  - Iodine (mmol/L concentration is usually higher than plasma, but dependent variable according to dietary iodine intake)
- Mucus (mucus in saliva mainly consists of mucopolysaccharides and glycoproteins)
- Antibacterial compounds (thiocyanate, hydrogen peroxide, and secretory immunoglobulin A)
- Epidermal growth factor (EGF)
- Saliva eliminates caesium, which can substitute for potassium in the cells.
- Various enzymes; most notably:
  - α-Amylase (EC 3.2.1.1), or ptyalin, secreted by the acinar cells of the parotid and submandibular glands, starts the digestion of starch before the food is swallowed; it has an optimum pH of 7.4
  - Kallikrein, an enzyme that proteolytically cleaves high-molecular-weight kininogen to produce bradykinin; it is secreted by the acinar cells of all three major salivary glands
  - Antimicrobial enzymes that kill bacteria:
    - Lysozyme
    - Salivary lactoperoxidase
    - Lactoferrin
    - Immunoglobulin A
    - Beta defensin
  - Proline-rich proteins (function in enamel formation, Ca^{2+}-binding, microbe killing, and lubrication)
  - Minor enzymes including: salivary acid phosphatases A and B, N-acetylmuramoyl-L-alanine amidase, NAD(P)H dehydrogenase (quinone), superoxide dismutase, glutathione transferase, class 3 aldehyde dehydrogenase, glucose-6-phosphate isomerase, and tissue kallikrein (function unknown)
- Cells: possibly as many as 8 million human and 500 million bacterial cells per mL. The presence of bacterial products (small organic acids, amines, and thiols) causes saliva to sometimes exhibit a foul odor.
- Opiorphin, a pain-killing substance found in human saliva
- Haptocorrin, a protein which binds to vitamin B_{12} to protect it against degradation in the stomach, before it binds to intrinsic factor
- Interestingly, saliva contains thiocyanate.

== Daily salivary output ==
Experts debate the amount of saliva that a healthy person produces. Production is estimated at 1,500 mL per day and researchers generally accept that during sleep the amount drops significantly. In humans, when not stimulated, the submandibular gland contributes around 65 to 75% of secretions, while the parotid gland secretes about 20 to 25%; small amounts are secreted from the other salivary glands. However, after being stimulated, for example by food, the contribution from the parotid gland increases to about 50%.

== Functions ==
Via the action of amylase and other enzymes, saliva contributes to the digestion of food and to the maintenance of oral hygiene. Saliva limits the growth of bacterial pathogens and is a major factor in sustaining systemic and oral health through the prevention of tooth decay. Saliva also acts as a buffer, reducing acidity of food components by its bicarbonate and phosphate content.

=== Lubricant ===
Saliva coats the oral mucosa, mechanically protecting it from trauma during eating, swallowing, and speaking. Mouth soreness is common in people with reduced saliva (xerostomia) and food (especially dry food) sticks to the inside of the mouth..

=== Digestion ===
The digestive functions of saliva include moistening food and helping to create a food bolus. The lubricative function of saliva allows the food bolus to be passed easily from the mouth into the esophagus. Saliva contains the enzyme amylase, also called ptyalin, which is capable of breaking down starch into simpler sugars such as maltose and dextrin that can be further broken down in the small intestine. About 30% of starch digestion takes place in the mouth cavity.

=== Role in taste ===
Saliva has a role in the sense of taste. It is the liquid medium in which chemicals are carried to taste receptor cells (mostly associated with lingual papillae). People with little saliva may experience dysgeusia (reduced ability to taste or to experience a metallic taste), occurring as an adverse effect of some prescription drugs.

=== Disease diagnosis ===
Saliva can be used in development of non-invasive biomarkers to diagnose the presence or risk of some diseases, such as dental caries and periodontal disease.

=== Other ===
- Saliva maintains the pH of the mouth. Saliva is supersaturated with various ions. Certain salivary proteins prevent precipitation, which would form salts. These ions act as a buffer, keeping the acidity of the mouth within a certain range, typically pH 6.2–7.4. This prevents minerals in the dental hard tissues from dissolving.
- Saliva secretes carbonic anhydrase (gustin), which is thought to play a role in the development of taste buds.
- Saliva contains epidermal growth factor (EGF), which promotes cellular proliferation, differentiation, and healing. The biological effects of salivary EGF include healing of oral and gastroesophageal ulcers, inhibition of gastric acid secretion, stimulation of DNA synthesis as well as mucosal protection from intraluminal injurious factors, such as gastric acid, bile acids, pepsin, and agents that may injure the oral cavity.

== Production ==
The production of saliva is stimulated both by the sympathetic nervous system and the parasympathetic.

Sympathetic stimulation of saliva is to facilitate respiration, whereas parasympathetic stimulation is to facilitate digestion.

Parasympathetic stimulation leads to acetylcholine (ACh) release onto the salivary acinar cells. ACh binds to muscarinic receptors, specifically M_{3}, and causes an increased intracellular calcium ion concentration (through the IP_{3}/DAG second messenger system). Increased calcium causes vesicles within the cells to fuse with the apical cell membrane leading to secretion. ACh also causes the salivary gland to release kallikrein, an enzyme that converts kininogen to lysyl-bradykinin. Lysyl-bradykinin acts upon blood vessels and capillaries of the salivary gland to generate vasodilation and increased capillary permeability, respectively. The resulting increased blood flow to the acini allows the production of more saliva. In addition, Substance P can bind to Tachykinin NK-1 receptors leading to increased intracellular calcium concentrations and subsequently increased saliva secretion. Lastly, both parasympathetic and sympathetic nervous stimulation can lead to myoepithelium contraction which causes the expulsion of secretions from the secretory acinus into the ducts and eventually to the oral cavity.

Sympathetic stimulation results in the release of norepinephrine. Norepinephrine binding to α-adrenergic receptors will cause an increase in intracellular calcium levels leading to more fluid vs. protein secretion. If norepinephrine binds β-adrenergic receptors, it will result in more protein or enzyme secretion vs. fluid secretion. Stimulation by norepinephrine initially decreases blood flow to the salivary glands due to constriction of blood vessels but this effect is overtaken by vasodilation caused by various local vasodilators.

Saliva production may also be pharmacologically stimulated by the so-called sialagogues. It can also be suppressed by the so-called antisialagogues.

== Behavior ==
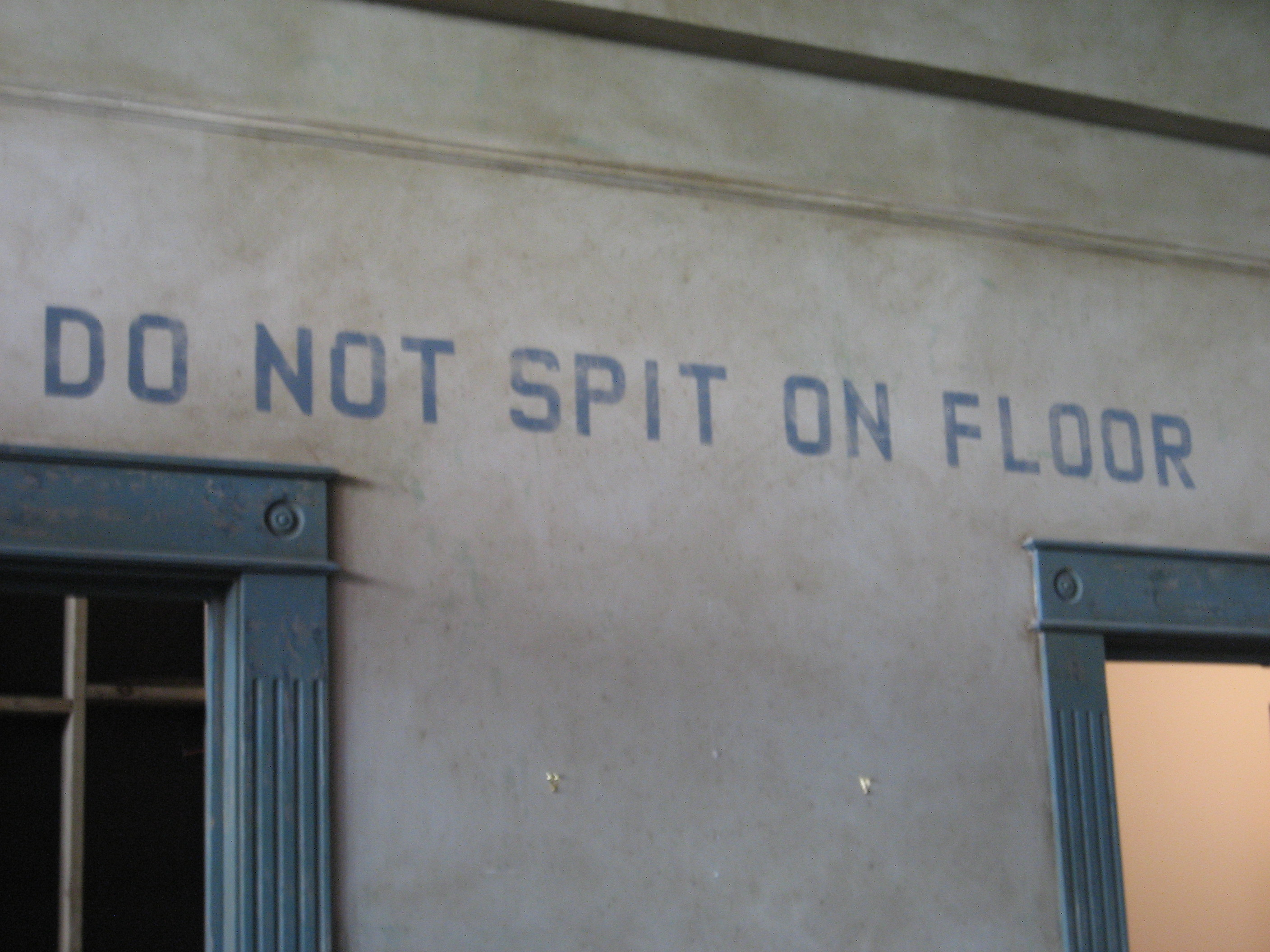
A building being renovated in the Carrollton section of New Orleans

=== Spitting ===
Spitting is the act of forcibly ejecting saliva or other substances from the mouth. In many parts of the world, it is considered rude and a social taboo, and has sometimes been outlawed. In some countries, for example, it has been outlawed for reasons of public decency and attempting to reduce the spread of disease. These laws may not be strictly enforced, but in Singapore, the fine for spitting may be as high as SGD$2,000 for multiple offenses, and one can even be arrested. In China, expectoration is more socially acceptable (even if officially disapproved of or illegal), and spittoons are still a common appearance in some cultures. Some animals, even humans in some cases, use spitting as an automatic defensive maneuver. Camels are well known for doing this, though most domestic camels are trained not to.

Spitting by an infected person (for example, one with SARS-CoV-2) whose saliva contains large amounts of virus, is a health hazard to the public.

=== Glue to construct bird nests ===
Many birds in the swift family, Apodidae, produce a viscous saliva during nesting season to glue together materials to construct a nest. Two species of swifts in the genus Aerodramus build their nests using only their saliva, the base for bird's nest soup.

=== Wound licking ===
A common belief is that saliva contained in the mouth has natural disinfectants, which leads people to believe it is beneficial to "lick their wounds". Researchers at the University of Florida at Gainesville have discovered a protein called nerve growth factor (NGF) in the saliva of mice. Wounds doused with NGF healed twice as fast as untreated and unlicked wounds; therefore, saliva can help to heal wounds in some species. NGF has been found in human saliva, as well as antibacterial agents as secretory mucin, IgA, lactoferrin, lysozyme and peroxidase. It has not been shown that human licking of wounds disinfects them, but licking is likely to help clean the wound by removing larger contaminants such as dirt and may help to directly remove infective bodies by brushing them away. Therefore, licking would be a way of wiping off pathogens, useful if clean water is not available to the animal or person.

=== Classical conditioning ===
In Pavlov's experiment, dogs were conditioned to salivate in response to a ringing bell; this stimulus is associated with a meal or hunger. Salivary secretion is also associated with nausea. Saliva is usually formed in the mouth through an act called gleeking, which can be voluntary or involuntary.

=== Making alcoholic beverages ===
Some old cultures use chewed grains to produce alcoholic beverages, such as in Latin America chicha de muko (a type of chicha) and kasiri, and in Japan kuchikamizake (a type of sake).

== Substitutes ==
Commercially available saliva substitutes exist.

== See also ==
- Basic reproduction number
- Fasting spittle
