= Bridget Bostock =

English faith healer (~1678 – post 1749)

Bridget Bostock (born c. 1678, died after 1749), also known as the Cheshire Doctoress, was a faith healer who spent her entire life in Coppenhall, Staffordshire. She had been working as a healer for many years, employing "fasting spittle, a little liquor of ‘a red complexion’, touch, and prayer", (Note: Fasting spittle is the spittle produced first thing in the morning, before breakfast.) but came to national prominence after she was featured in a local newspaper in August 1748, when she was about 70 years of age. Her fame became such that by the following month she was receiving 600–700 visitors a day seeking her assistance, and she soon decided that she would only see those she had dealt with before or who were deaf. Sir John Price, a Welsh baronet, repeatedly importuned Bostock to raise his wife from the dead, but she refused.

Bostock was reported to be a regular churchgoer and a person of great faith by the minister of her church, William Harding of St Lawrence's Church, Coppenhall whose son claimed that she had cured his lameness. Nothing is known of her after 1749.

== See also ==
- Spittle cures
