= Grade II* listed buildings in Tandridge (district) =

Tandridge shown within Surrey

There are over 20,000 Grade II* listed buildings in England. This page is a list of the 52 Grade II* listed buildings in the district of Tandridge in Surrey. For links to similar articles in relation to the other 10 districts of Surrey see Grade II* listed buildings in Surrey.

Name	Location	Type	Completed (Note: The date given is the date used by Historic England as significant for the initial building or that of an important part in the structure's description.)	Date designated	Grid ref. (Note: Sometimes known as OSGB36, the grid reference is based on the British national grid reference system used by the Ordnance Survey.) Geo-coordinates	Entry number (Note: The "List Entry Number" is a unique number assigned to each listed building and scheduled monument by Historic England.)	Image
King Charles Cottage Restaurant	Bletchingley	House	19th century	11 June 1958	TQ3272150790; 51°14′27″N 0°06′00″W	1029976	Upload Photo
Place Farm House including Cleves Cottage	Bletchingley	House	16th century	11 June 1958	TQ3266252121; 51°15′10″N 0°06′02″W	1029989	Upload Photo
The Hawthorns (Pendell Court)	Bletchingley	House/School	1624	11 June 1958	TQ3170651889; 51°15′03″N 0°06′51″W	1281104	The Hawthorns (Pendell Court) More images
The Manor House	Bletchingley	House	Late 18th century	11 June 1958	TQ3160951718; 51°14′58″N 0°06′56″W	1204686	The Manor House
The Whyte Harte Inn including Former Stable to Rear	Bletchingley	Inn	16th century	11 June 1958	TQ3274550748; 51°14′26″N 0°05′59″W	1377531	The Whyte Harte Inn including Former Stable to Rear More images
42–44 High Street	Bletchingley	House	18th century	11 June 1958	TQ3270850786; 51°14′27″N 0°06′01″W	1204531	Upload Photo
Burstow Lodge	Burstow	House	C15	11 June 1958	TQ3147144189; 51°10′55″N 0°07′13″W	1204768	Burstow Lodge
Crullings & Smallfield Place	Burstow	House	c. 1600	11 June 1958	TQ3267043173; 51°10′21″N 0°06′13″W	1029963	Upload Photo
Chaldon Court	Chaldon	Timber Framed House	14th century	21 September 1954	TQ3082055676; 51°17′07″N 0°07′32″W	1029812	Upload Photo
Tollsworth Manor House	Chaldon	House	17th century	21 September 1954	TQ3059954595; 51°16′32″N 0°07′45″W	1029822	Upload Photo
Beddlestead House	Chelsham, Chelsham and Farleigh	Wealden Hall House	15th Century	11 June 1958	TQ3986657739; 51°18′06″N 0°00′18″E	1029796	Beddlestead House More images
Granary and Barn 15 Yards South West of Crowhurst Place	Crowhurst	Granary	15th century	9 March 1982	TQ3859546336; 51°11′58″N 0°01′04″W	1377584	Upload Photo
Mansion House Farm House	Crowhurst	House	17th century	11 June 1958	TQ3911847414; 51°12′32″N 0°00′35″W	1029930	Mansion House Farm House More images
Dwelly Farm House	Dormansland	Farmhouse	late C16/early 17th century	11 February 1958	TQ4170946000; 51°11′44″N 0°01′36″E	1029914	Upload Photo
Hoopers Farm House	Dormansland	Farmhouse	19th century	11 June 1958	TQ4269942788; 51°10′00″N 0°02′23″E	1205719	Upload Photo
Puttenden Manor House	Dormansland	House	17th century	11 June 1958	TQ4088145477; 51°11′28″N 0°00′53″E	1280736	Puttenden Manor House More images
Starborough Castle Walls and Garden House	Dormansland	Castle	1754	11 June 1958	TQ4260744120; 51°10′43″N 0°02′20″E	1205666	Upload Photo
Lagham Manor	Godstone	Manor House	16th century	11 June 1958	TQ3636448055; 51°12′56″N 0°02′56″W	1029769	Upload Photo
St Mary's Almshouses and Chapel of St Mary	Godstone	Jettied House	1872	11 June 1958	TQ3569851465; 51°14′46″N 0°03′26″W	1188470	St Mary's Almshouses and Chapel of St Mary More images
The Bell Hotel	Godstone	House	c. 1700	11 June 1958	TQ3509151467; 51°14′47″N 0°03′57″W	1029779	The Bell Hotel More images
The Old Packhouse	Godstone	House	Late 16th century	11 June 1958	TQ3571051096; 51°14′34″N 0°03′26″W	1294724	Upload Photo
The White Hart	Godstone	Restaurant	16th century	11 June 1958	TQ3505951557; 51°14′50″N 0°03′59″W	1188625	The White Hart More images
Church of St Mary the Virgin	Horne	Church	14th century	11 June 1958	TQ3368544349; 51°10′58″N 0°05′19″W	1377549	Church of St Mary the Virgin More images
Lowlands Farm House	Horne	House	16th century	25 April 1984	TQ3635942407; 51°09′53″N 0°03′04″W	1205065	Upload Photo
Batchelors Farm House	Limpsfield	Farmhouse	15th century	19 November 1984	TQ4262448469; 51°13′03″N 0°02′27″E	1188980	Upload Photo
Court Cottage	Limpsfield	Row	16th century and 17th century	11 June 1958	TQ4055753090; 51°15′35″N 0°00′47″E	1188723	Upload Photo
Detillens Cottage	Limpsfield	House	C20	11 June 1958	TQ4056853096; 51°15′35″N 0°00′47″E	1377656	Detillens Cottage More images
Detillens House	Limpsfield	House	1736	11 June 1958	TQ4057353067; 51°15′34″N 0°00′48″E	1377657	Detillens House
Friars Cottage	Pains Hill, Limpsfield	House	C20	11 June 1958	TQ4114851719; 51°14′50″N 0°01′15″E	1377660	Upload Photo
Miles Butchers Shop and Dentists Surgery	Limpsfield	Cross Wing House	15th century	11 June 1958	TQ4059453050; 51°15′33″N 0°00′49″E	1188829	Upload Photo
Pebble Mill House Including Rangers Cottage to Rear	Limpsfield	House	c. 1776	11 June 1958	TQ4087652731; 51°15′23″N 0°01′03″E	1029730	Upload Photo
Tenchleys Manor	Itchingwood Common, Limpsfield	House	1599 (Dendrochronology report)	11 June 1958	TQ4215250980; 51°14′25″N 0°02′06″E	1029762	Tenchleys Manor More images
The Moat Farm House including Barn Attached to Right	Limpsfield	House	Late 16th century	11 June 1958	TQ4252250697; 51°14′16″N 0°02′25″E	1029763	Upload Photo
Church House & Star Inn Cottages	Lingfield	House	16th century	11 June 1958	TQ3892243734; 51°10′34″N 0°00′50″W	1205173	Church House & Star Inn Cottages More images
Magnus Deo	Lingfield	House	18th century	11 June 1958	TQ3858243527; 51°10′27″N 0°01′08″W	1205825	Upload Photo
New Place	Lingfield	House	1617	11 June 1958	TQ3928643745; 51°10′34″N 0°00′32″W	1280486	New Place More images
Old Town House and Old Town Cottage	Lingfield	House	17th century	11 June 1958	TQ3889643739; 51°10′34″N 0°00′52″W	1029910	Old Town House and Old Town Cottage
The College including former Kitchen to South West	Lingfield	College	c. 1700	11 June 1958	TQ3883543778; 51°10′35″N 0°00′55″W	1205289	The College including former Kitchen to South West
The Garth	Lingfield	House	1729	11 June 1958	TQ3807043666; 51°10′32″N 0°01′34″W	1205754	Upload Photo
The Guest House (The Library)	Lingfield	House/Library	C20	11 June 1958	TQ3887643828; 51°10′37″N 0°00′53″W	1205909	The Guest House (The Library) More images
The Old House	Lingfield	House	17th century	22 March 1973	TQ3837243841; 51°10′37″N 0°01′19″W	1205370	Upload Photo
Church of St Peter and St Paul	Nutfield	Church	13th century	11 June 1958	TQ3092050870; 51°14′31″N 0°07′33″W	1377573	Church of St Peter and St Paul More images
Cogmans Farm House	Outwood	Base Cruck House	15th century	11 June 1958	TQ3248044571; 51°11′06″N 0°06′21″W	1377560	Upload Photo
Mayflower Cottage	Broadham Green, Oxted	Hall House	15th century	11 June 1958	TQ3886051194; 51°14′35″N 0°00′43″W	1189581	Upload Photo
Stocketts Manor	Oxted	House	17th century	11 June 1958	TQ3925150387; 51°14′08″N 0°00′24″W	1189612	Stocketts Manor More images
The Old Bell Inn	Oxted	Inn	16th century	11 June 1958	TQ3848552230; 51°15′09″N 0°01′01″W	1189620	The Old Bell Inn More images
The Old Cottage	Broadham Green, Oxted	House	19th century	11 June 1958	TQ3870051150; 51°14′34″N 0°00′52″W	1029734	Upload Photo
Hobbs Farm House	Tandridge	Farmhouse	17th century	11 June 1958	TQ3754047377; 51°12′33″N 0°01′57″W	1029716	Upload Photo
The Red Barn	Tandridge	House	17th century	11 June 1958	TQ3703145232; 51°11′24″N 0°02′26″W	1189853	Upload Photo
Church of St James the Greater	Titsey	Former Church	1861	11 June 1958	TQ4091354975; 51°16′35″N 0°01′08″E	1294053	Church of St James the Greater More images
Church of All Saints	Warlingham	Church	13th century	21 September 1954	TQ3557858960; 51°18′49″N 0°03′22″W	1188033	Church of All Saints More images
The Vicarage	Warlingham	House	c. 1674	21 September 1954	TQ3553158414; 51°18′31″N 0°03′25″W	1029794	The Vicarage
