= Grade II* listed buildings in Elmbridge =

Elmbridge shown within Surrey

There are over 20,000 Grade II* listed buildings in England. This page is a list of the 23 Grade II* listed buildings in the district of Elmbridge in Surrey. For links to similar articles in relation to the other 10 districts of Surrey see Grade II* listed buildings in Surrey.

Name	Location	Type	Completed (Note: The date given is the date used by Historic England as significant for the initial building or that of an important part in the structure's description.)	Date designated	Grid ref. (Note: Sometimes known as OSGB36, the grid reference is based on the British national grid reference system used by the Ordnance Survey.) Geo-coordinates	Entry number (Note: The "List Entry Number" is a unique number assigned to each listed building and scheduled monument by Historic England.)	Image
Barn at Upper Manor Farm, 40 Yards South of Number 81 (the Rectory)	Stoke D'Abernon	Barn	19th century	10 December 1981	TQ1297058707; 51°18′59″N 0°22′49″W	1030109	Upload Photo
Benfleet Hall	Cobham	House	1860	4 February 1963	TQ1226461379; 51°20′26″N 0°23′23″W	1189134	Upload Photo
Cedar House	Cobham	House	Mid 18th century	14 August 1953	TQ1112559932; 51°19′40″N 0°24′23″W	1365901	Cedar House More images
Chatley Semaphore Tower	Cobham	Tower	1822	14 August 1953	TQ0894258506; 51°18′55″N 0°26′18″W	1286699	Chatley Semaphore Tower More images
Church of St Charles Borromeo with attached Presbyteries	Weybridge	Chapel and Priest's House	c. 1834	10 February 1977	TQ0731064167; 51°21′59″N 0°27′36″W	1189164	Church of St Charles Borromeo with attached Presbyteries More images
Church of St James	Weybridge	Church	1848	19 October 1951	TQ0722164736; 51°22′18″N 0°27′40″W	1188363	Church of St James More images
Church Stile House	Cobham	House	18th century	14 August 1953	TQ1078959810; 51°19′36″N 0°24′41″W	1294922	Church Stile House More images
Former Kitchen Garden Walls to Claremont House	Esher	Garden Wall	c. 1720	16 November 1984	TQ1373963631; 51°21′37″N 0°22′04″W	1377465	Upload Photo
Ham Manor	Cobham	House	Mid 18th century	14 August 1953	TQ1102459911; 51°19′39″N 0°24′29″W	1365900	Upload Photo
Henry Bridge's Almshouses	Thames Ditton	House	1720	14 August 1953	TQ1568866945; 51°23′23″N 0°20′19″W	1030105	Henry Bridge's Almshouses More images
Home Farm House and Barns	Cobham	Farmhouse	c. 1860	10 October 1975	TQ0792060766; 51°20′09″N 0°27′08″W	1377473	Upload Photo
Home of Compassion	Thames Ditton	House	c. 1786	14 August 1953	TQ1620267222; 51°23′32″N 0°19′53″W	1030197	Home of Compassion More images
Milestone	Esher	Milestone	1747	28 May 1969	TQ1342462971; 51°21′16″N 0°22′21″W	1377464	Upload Photo
Newlands	Weston Green	House	Late 17th century	14 August 1953	TQ1534866387; 51°23′05″N 0°20′38″W	1030088	Upload Photo
Obelisk 10 Yards to Rear of Number 6 (Home Farm House)	Esher	Obelisk	Early 18th century	14 August 1953	TQ1386763673; 51°21′39″N 0°21′57″W	1190801	Upload Photo
Painshill House	Cobham	House	1778	17 March 1982	TQ0972760351; 51°19′54″N 0°25′35″W	1030132	Painshill House More images
Parkside School	Stoke D'Abernon	House	c. 1760	16 November 1984	TQ1304558462; 51°18′51″N 0°22′46″W	1030110	Parkside School
The Belvedere, 250 Yards South West of Claremont House	Esher	Belvedere	c. 1716	14 August 1953	TQ1331163286; 51°21′26″N 0°22′27″W	1030204	The Belvedere, 250 Yards South West of Claremont House More images
The Clubhouse, Brooklands Museum	Weybridge	Restaurant	1906-1907	1 November 2002	TQ0703262839; 51°21′16″N 0°27′52″W	1272443	The Clubhouse, Brooklands Museum More images
The Elms	Weston Green	House	Early 18th century	14 August 1953	TQ1517166284; 51°23′02″N 0°20′47″W	1030087	Upload Photo
The Gothic Temple	Cobham	Garden Temple	Late 18th century	16 November 1984	TQ0966860032; 51°19′44″N 0°25′38″W	1030124	The Gothic Temple More images
The Gothic Tower	Cobham	Prospect Tower	Mid 19th century	9 April 1973	TQ0850759782; 51°19′36″N 0°26′39″W	1191694	The Gothic Tower More images
White Cottage	Esher	House	c. 1720	28 May 1969	TQ1357063503; 51°21′33″N 0°22′13″W	1377463	Upload Photo
