= Chelsea Town Hall =

Municipal building in London, England

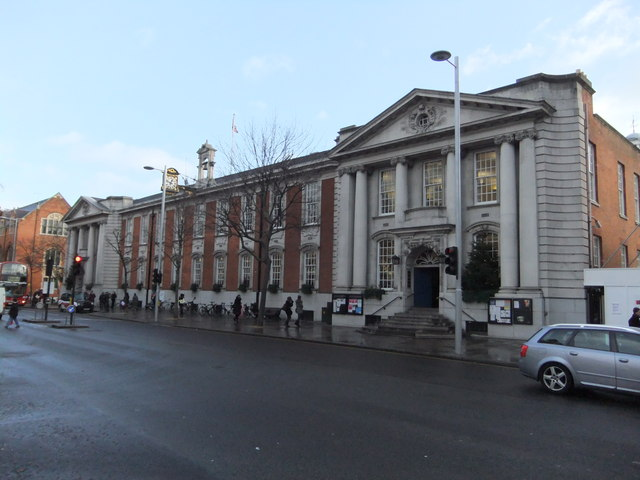
- The Stokes extension on King's Road

- Shown in Kensington and Chelsea Chelsea Town Hall (Greater London) Chelsea Town Hall (England)
- 51.4874°N 0.1682°W
- Location: King's Road, Chelsea

History
- Built: 1887

Site notes
- Architect: John McKean Brydon
- Architectural style: Neoclassical style

Listed Building – Grade II*
- Official name: Old Vestry Hall (the Brydon Building)
- Designated: 15 April 1969
- Reference no.: 1294164

Listed Building – Grade II
- Official name: Chelsea Town Hall (the Stokes extension)
- Designated: 15 April 1969
- Reference no.: 1224630

Chelsea Town Hall is a municipal building in King's Road, Chelsea, London. The oldest part is a Grade II* listed building and the later part is Grade II listed.

== History ==
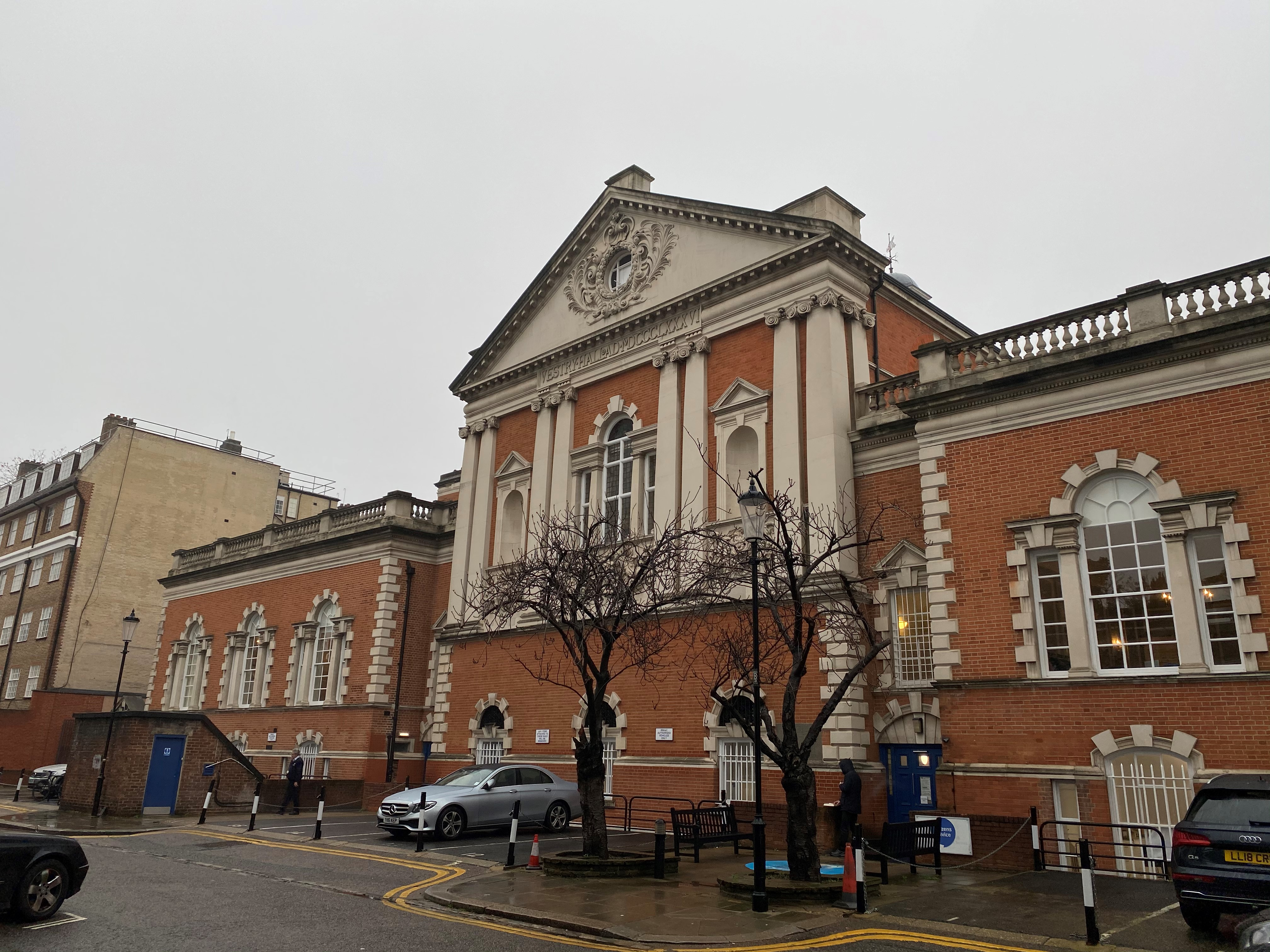
Brydon's vestry hall in Chelsea Manor Gardens

The building was commissioned to replace a mid-19th-century vestry hall on King's Road, which had been designed by William Willmer Pocock in the Italianate style for the Parish of St Luke's and which had been found to be structurally unsound.

The oldest part of the current complex is the vestry hall in Chelsea Manor Gardens, which was designed by John McKean Brydon in the neoclassical style and built by a local builder, Charles Wall; it was officially opened on 12 January 1887. The design involved a symmetrical main frontage with nine bays facing onto Chelsea Manor Gardens; the central section of three bays featured three windows above which there was a large Venetian window flanked by huge Ionic order pilasters supporting a pediment. A cupola with a dome and weather vane was erected at roof level. This building became the headquarters of the Metropolitan Borough of Chelsea on its formation in 1900. Internally, the main rooms were the main hall, which was particularly ornate, a smaller hall and the Cadogan Suite, the latter two being located in side wings off the main hall.

After civic leaders found that Pocock's vestry hall was structurally unsound, they elected to demolish it and construct a new structure to the designs of Leonard Stokes in the neoclassical style on the King's Road site. The works were carried out by A.N. Coles of Plymouth at a cost of £35,000 and completed in 1907. The design for this frontage involved 15 bays with two sections at either end with doorways with fanlights flanked by windows and by full-height Ionic order columns supporting pediments; the two end-sections also had windows on the first floor. The frontage also had a clock which projected over the street and central bellcote.

The town hall continued to be used as a public venue and concert performers included the contralto singer, Kathleen Ferrier, who made an appearance on 15 April 1947. The complex ceased to be the local seat of government when the Royal Borough of Kensington and Chelsea was formed in 1965. However the Brydon building became the main Kensington and Chelsea Register Office and subsequently hosted several famous weddings including the marriage of Judy Garland to Mickey Deans in March 1969.

After being refurbished by Roderick Ham & Partners, the Stokes extension became the main Chelsea branch library in 1978. The Chelsea Art Society also decided to establish its home in the Stokes extension in 1994 and it began to hold a series of annual exhibitions there showing work by both professional and non-professional artists. An internal refurbishment of the rooms in the Brydon building was completed by Ark Build in February 2019.
