= Robert Bostock =

Robert Bostock may refer to:

- Robert Bostock (merchant) (1784–1847), English sea merchant
- Robert Bostock (cleric) (1607–1640), archdeacon of Suffolk
- Robert Bostock (slave trader, born 1743) (1743–1793), English slave trader
