= The Endwood =

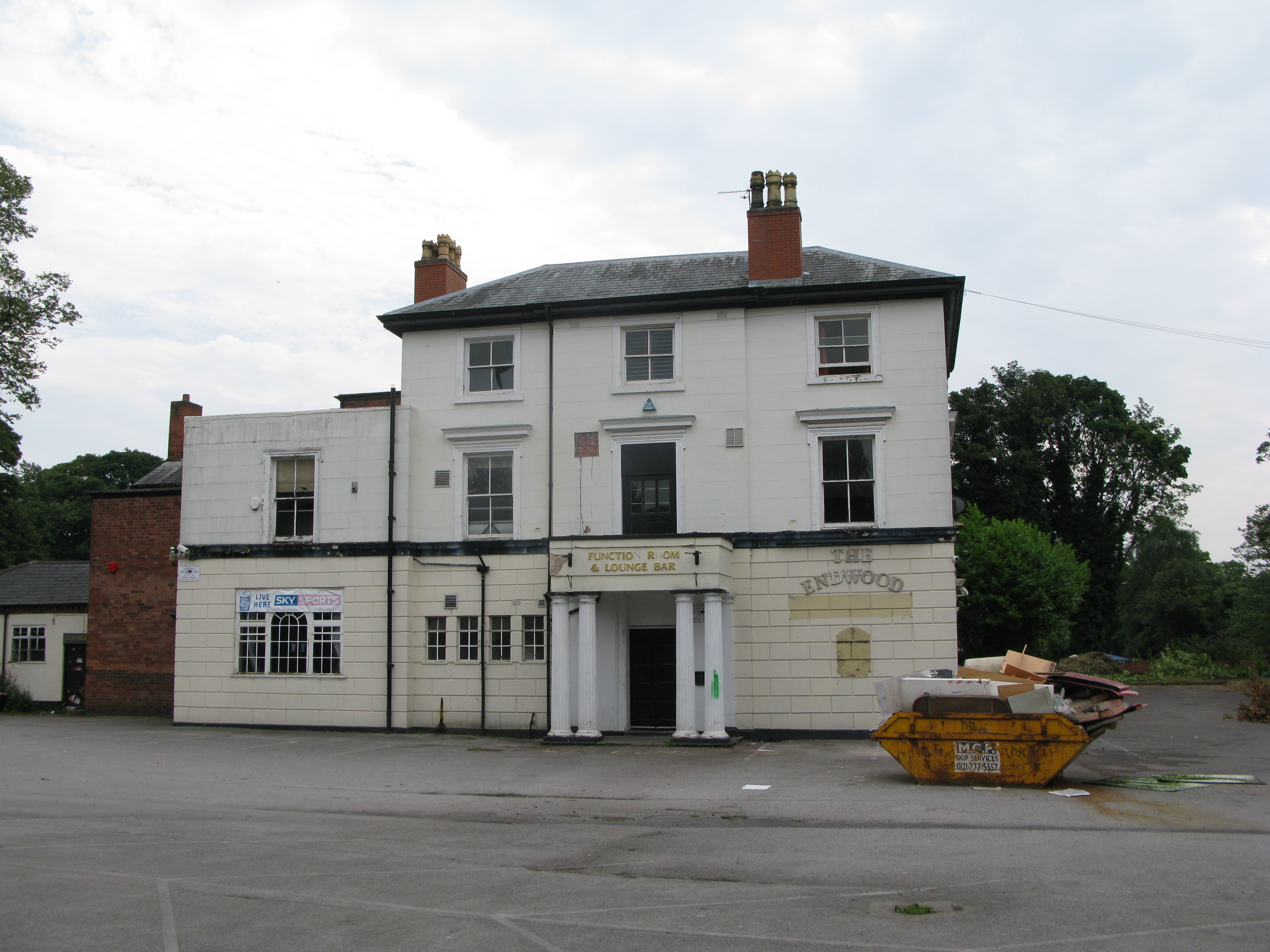
- The pub in 2013
- Interactive map of the The Endwood area
- Former names: Church Hill House; Hill House Hotel; Endwood Hotel

General information
- Status: Empty
- Type: Public House (former residence)
- Location: Birmingham, England
- Coordinates: 52.512362°N 1.919737°W
- Completed: 1820

Technical details
- Floor count: 3

Design and construction
- Designations: Grade II listed

The Endwood is a disused grade II listed public house on Hamstead Road, in the Handsworth Wood district of Birmingham, England.

The three-storey building was constructed as a private residence, Church Hill House, in 1820, when Handsworth Wood was part of Staffordshire. It has a stucco finish, a slate roof and porch with doric columns.

Around the 1880s, it was occupied by the Muntz family, George Frederic Muntz' second son William Henry Muntz having married Alice Parker, the second daughter of its occupant, George Parker, in 1846.

It subsequently became a hotel, known as the Hill House Hotel and then the Endwood Hotel, before being purchased in 1937 by the brewers Butlers of Wolverhampton, who used it as a pub. That company, and thus the Endwood, was acquired by Mitchells & Butlers in 1960.

It was given listed building status in July 1982.

A 2001 proposal to convert the building into flats was dismissed. In June 2015, a planning application was submitted to Birmingham City Council, for use of the building as an education centre.

The building sits immediately opposite the site of the defunct Handsworth Wood railway station (1896–1941), and the railway line passes beneath the house in a short tunnel. St Mary's Church (Norman, rebuilt 1820) and Handsworth Park (1880s) are also nearby to the south, as is the A4040 road to the north.
