= Fasting spittle =

Saliva produced first thing in the morning

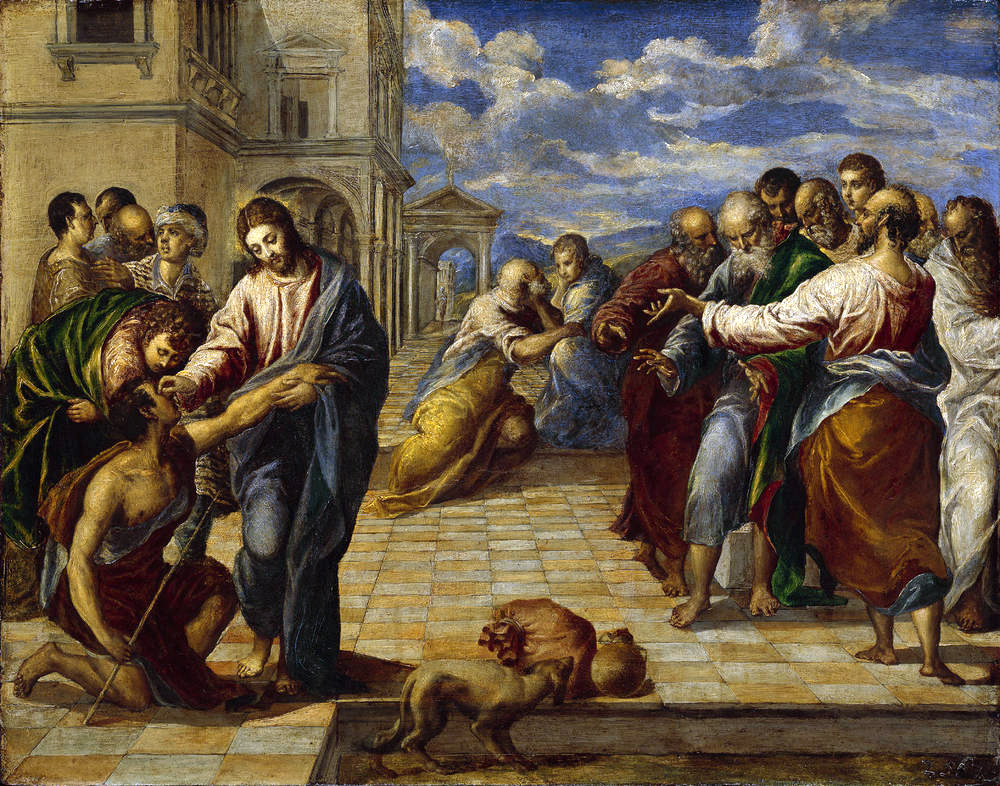
Jesus's miracle of Healing the man blind from birth as depicted in El Greco's Healing of the Man Born Blind, 1567

Fasting spittle – saliva produced first thing in the morning, before breakfast – was a treatment used in folk medicine in the ancient Mediterranean. Spittle was thought to cure many diseases. Spittle cures were usually considered to be more effective if fasting spittle was used.

An early reference to the alleged medicinal benefits comes from the Roman author Varro, who mentions it as a cure for epilepsy and snake bites among other ailments.

Roman natural philosopher Pliny commented in his Natural History that fasting spittle was efficacious in the treatment of ophthalmia, and that the fasting spittle of a woman was particularly beneficial for treating bloodshot eyes.

The New Testament contains multiple instances of Jesus using spit as a cure. The Gospel of Mark records Jesus spitting directly into the eyes of a blind man, and the Gospel of John records Jesus using a mixture of spit and mud to make a poultice for healing blindness.

And they bring unto him [Jesus] one that was deaf, and had an impediment in his speech ... And he took him aside from the multitude, and put his fingers into his ears, and he spit, and touched his tongue; and saith unto him, Ephphatha, that is, Be opened. Mark 7:32–5

When he had thus spoken, he spat on the ground, and made clay of the spittle, and he anointed the eyes of the blind man with the clay. John 9:6

Suetonius, Tacitus and Cassius Dio mention Roman Emperor Vespasian treating blindness in a similar fashion. Tacitus mentions that Vespasian consulted with physicians before healing the blind man with his spit. Tacitus also gives a natural, medical explanation for the healing, unlike Suetonius and Cassius Dio who ascribe a more supernatural aura to the restoration of the blind man's sight.

The Talmud also references the alleged medicinal benefits of saliva, particularly that of a first-born son.

A certain person once came before R. Hanina and said to him, 'I am sure that this man is firstborn'. R. Hanina said to him, 'How do you know?' — The person replied to him: 'Because when people came to his father, he used to say to them: "Go to my son Shikhath, who is firstborn and his saliva heals'. Might he not have been the firstborn of his mother only [but not of his father]? There is a tradition that the saliva of the firstborn of a father heals, but that of the firstborn of a mother does not heal.

— Bava Basra 12:6b of the Talmud
