= Francis Bostick =

American engineer

Francis X. Bostick
- Born: June 1, 1932; Shreveport, Louisiana, USA
- Died: October 20, 2021 (aged 89)
- Education: University of Texas at Austin
- Scientific career
- Fields: Electronics; Electromagnetic Field Theory
- Workplaces: University of Texas at Austin

Francis X. Bostick was an American engineer, and a Distinguished Professor Emeritus and the Hayden Head Centennial Professor Emeritus at Cockrell School of Engineering, University of Texas at Austin. He was chairman of the Electrical and Computer Engineering Department of the College of Engineering from 1996-2001. He was awarded the Chancellor's Council Outstanding Teaching Award.

Francis X. Bostick developed Electromagnetic array profiling (EMAP), a geophysical method for mapping subsurface resistivity.
