= Forward Operating Base Bostick =

FOB Bostick
- Naray, Kunar Province in Afghanistan
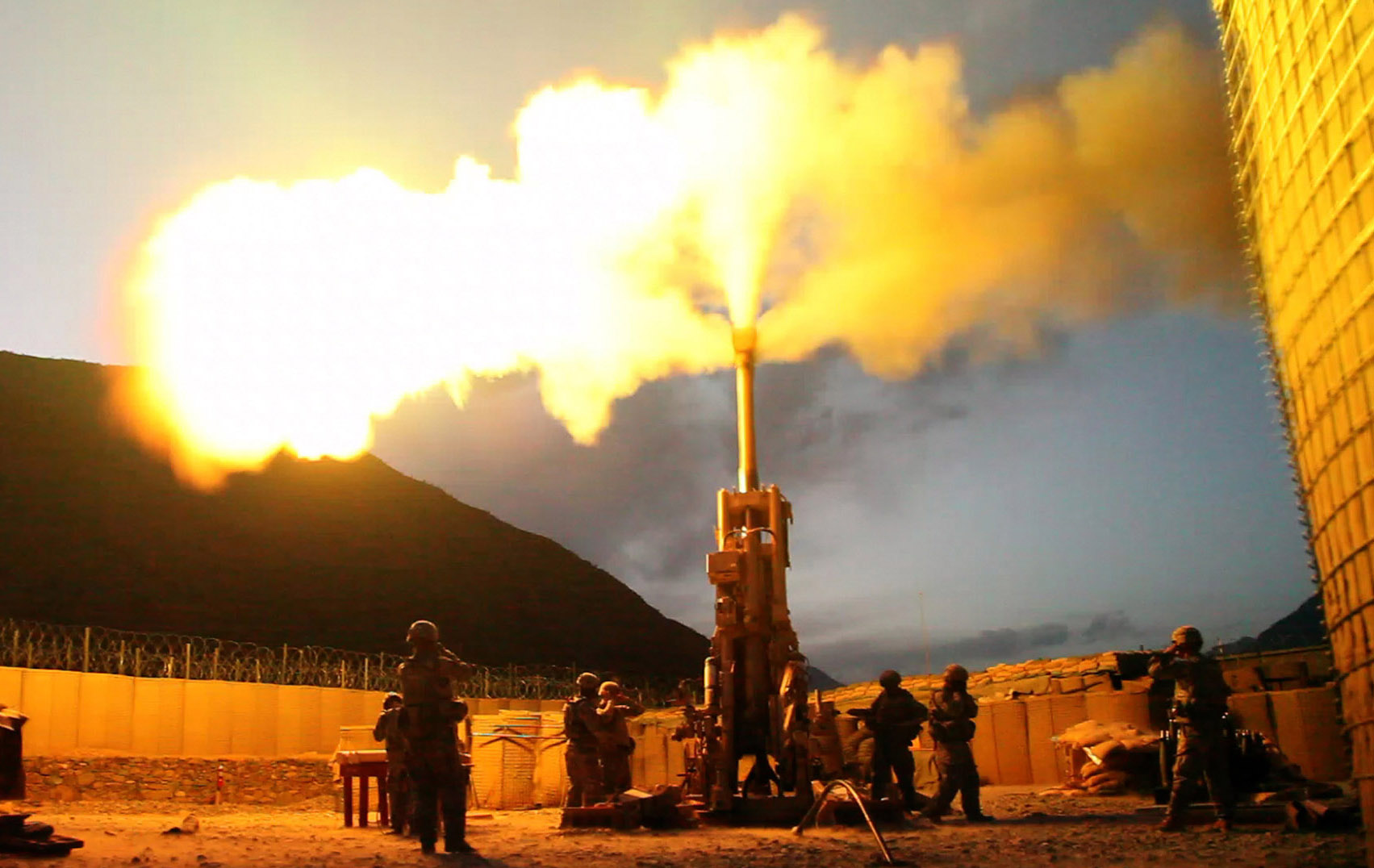
- U.S. Army soldiers firing M777 howitzer from FOB Bostick, 2009

Site information
- Type: Forward operating base
- Owner: International Security Assistance Force (ISAF)
- Operator: United States Armed Forces; Afghan National Army

Location
- Shown within Afghanistan
- Coordinates: 35°12′33″N 71°31′18″E

Site history
- Built: 2005
- In use: 2005-2013

Airfield information
Helipads
Number	Length and surface
01	30m x 20m Asphalt
02	30m x 20m Asphalt
03	30m x 20m Asphalt
04	30m x 20m Asphalt
05	30m x 20m Asphalt
06	30m x 20m Asphalt

Forward Operating Base Bostick (FOB Bostick), previously called FOB Naray, was a U.S. military outpost in the Kunar Province of Afghanistan. In July 2008, the name of the base was changed in memory of Major Thomas G. Bostick Jr. of Llano, Texas, who was killed in action.

== Deployed units ==
Units deployed to FOB Bostick have included:

- 367th Engineer Battalion Detachment (2005)
- Alpha Battery, 1st Battalion, 188th Air Defence Artillery (ND ARNG) (2006-2007)
- 3rd Squadron, 71st Cavalry Regiment (RSTA)(2006-2007)
- 1st Squadron, 91st Cavalry Regiment (2007)
  - Headquarters and Headquarters Troop
- 4th Battalion, 25th Field Artillery Regiment (2006-2007)
- Embedded Training Team 7-2
- 6th Squadron, 4th Cavalry Regiment (2008-2009)
- 3rd Battalion, 321st Field Artillery Regiment (2008-2009)
- Charlie Battery, 1st Battalion, 321st Field Artillery Regiment (Airborne) (2009-2010)
- Bravo Battery, 3rd Battalion, 321st Field Artillery Regiment (2010)
- 2nd Platoon, 984th Military Police Company (2009-2010)
- 3rd Squadron, 61st Cavalry Regiment (2009-2010)
- 1st Squadron, 32nd Cavalry Regiment (2010-2011)
  - Charlie Troop
  - Delta Troop
- 1st Battalion, 377th Field Artillery Regiment (2011-2012)
- 2nd Battalion, 27th Infantry Regiment ( March 2011-2012)
  - Battalion Headquarters
  - Headquarters and Headquarters Company
  - Charlie Company
  - Fox Company (Support/maintenance)
- 1st Battalion, 12th Infantry Regiment (March 2012 - )
  - Headquarters and Headquarters Company
  - Charlie Company
- 91st Cavalry Regiment

Aviation

- C Company, 563rd Aviation Support Battalion (2008-2009)
- Elements of 10th Combat Aviation Brigade (2010-2011)
- Elements of 101st Combat Aviation Brigade (2012-2013)
- Elements of 82nd Combat Aviation Brigade
  - 122nd Aviation Support Battalion (2007)
- Elements of 10th Combat Aviation Brigade

== See also ==
- List of forward operating bases
- List of NATO installations in Afghanistan
