= Nathan Bostock =

British banker

- Born: Nathan Mark Bostock; October 1960 (age 65–66)
- Occupation: Banker
- Title: CEO, Santander UK
- Term: September 2014-
- Predecessor: Ana Patricia Botín
- Spouse: Married
- Children: 2 sons

Nathan Mark Bostock (born October 1960) is a British banker, and was the CEO of Santander UK, until leaving the role in 2022.

== Early life ==
Nathan Bostock was born in October 1960. He has a bachelor's degree in mathematics.

== Career ==
Bostock started his career training as an accountant with Coopers & Lybrand before working for Chase Manhattan Bank in risk analysis and interest rate derivatives from 1988 to 1992, rising to head of risk analysis and finance, treasury and interest derivatives (Europe).

Bostock worked for RBS for nine years from 1993 to 2001, rising to head of risk.

From 2001 to 2009, Bostock worked for Abbey National (now Santander UK), and was a main board director from 2005.

In June 2009, Bostock returned to RBS as the "new right-hand man" to CEO Stephen Hester, tasked with trying to sell off non-core assets. He joined RBS as head of restructuring and risk, later becoming group chief risk officer and then finance director. In 2011 he turned down a move to head up the wholesale division of Lloyds Banking Group, reportedly due to the ill-health absence of their chief executive, António Horta Osório. He resigned after only ten weeks as finance director.

Bostock joined Santander UK as deputy CEO in August 2014, and became CEO in September 2014, succeeding Ana Patricia Botín.

In January 2018, the Liberal Democrat leader Sir Vince Cable stated in Parliament that Bostock had been responsible for RBS's Global Restructuring Group (GRG), when it had "engaged in an intentional strategy that resulted in mistreatment of business customers".

Bostock received a £6.4m pay package in 2018.

== Personal life ==
Bostock is married, with two sons, and has a farm near Maidstone, Kent.
