= Timothy Bostock =

English cricketer

Personal information
- Full name: Timothy Jon Bostock
- Born: 21 January 1962 (age 64); Widnes, Lancashire, England
- Nickname: Bozzy
- Batting: Right-handed
- Bowling: Right-arm off break

Domestic team information
- Years: Team
- 1992–1996: Cheshire

Career statistics
Competition	List A
Matches	4
Runs scored	57
Batting average	14.25
100s/50s	–/–
Top score	42
Balls bowled	66
Wickets	–
Bowling average	–
5 wickets in innings	–
10 wickets in match	–
Best bowling	–
Catches/stumpings	–/–
- Source: Cricinfo, 13 April 2011

Timothy Jon Bostock (born 21 January 1962) is a former English cricketer. Bostock was a right-handed batsman who bowled right-arm off break. He was born in Widnes, Lancashire.

He was educated at Merchant Taylors' School, Crosby in Liverpool on a scholarship, excelling at both cricket and rugby union whilst there.

His rugby career continued post school at Waterloo as a member of the successful Colts side captained by Mike Dixon.

He also played for Widnes Rugby Club for many years.

Bostock made his debut for Cheshire in the 1992 Minor Counties Championship against Cornwall. Bostock played Minor counties cricket for Cheshire from 1992 to 1996, including 16 Minor Counties Championship matches and 8 MCCA Knockout Trophy matches. In 1992, he made his List A debut against Gloucestershire in the NatWest Trophy. He played three further List A matches for Cheshire, the last coming against Northamptonshire in the 1996 NatWest Trophy. In his four List A matches, he scored 57 runs at a batting average of 14.25, with a high score of 42. His highest score came against Essex in the 1995 NatWest Trophy. With the ball he bowled 11 wicket-less overs.

Following his retirement from playing, he became involved in cricket administration. He is currently the chief executive of Durham County Cricket Club. Under his stewardship, Durham returned to the 1st Division in 2023, for the first time since 2016.

A golfer over five decades, playing off 2 at Blackwell Golf Club in Worcestershire, he is Captain of the ten man team that contests the John Harrison Trophy once a year against the OOM from Formby Golf Club.

In June 2023 he became Seniors Club Champion and followed it up a year later by becoming Club Champion.
