= Team Housing Solutions =

Team Housing Solutions (THS) is a defense contractor based in New Braunfels, Texas, providing housing for government contracts. It was founded by Mandy Cavanaugh in 1995.

== Economics ==
USAspending.gov identifies over $11 million in awards to the company to support border patrol operations.

THS supported Texas's Operation Lone Star immigration enforcement effort with over $825 million in no-bid contracts by 2025.

A United States Immigration and Customs Enforcement contract near Newport, Oregon noted a large effort by THS to acquire housing, in advance of a rumored yearlong deployment of an immigration force at the Newport Municipal Airport. Contract details implied a large detention facility, though THS has no history of building these.

The company received over $1 million in COVID-19 PPP loans and reported approximately 33 employees in January 2021.

== See also ==
- Corpay
- Corporate housing
- Short-term rental
