= James Bostock =

James Bostock may refer to:

- James Bostock (sport shooter) (1874–1948), British sports shooter
- James Bostock (painter) (1917–2006), British painter
