= Grade II* listed buildings in Surrey =

Surrey shown within England

The county of Surrey is divided into 11 districts: Spelthorne, Runnymede, Surrey Heath, Woking, Elmbridge, Guildford, Waverley, Mole Valley, Epsom and Ewell, Reigate and Banstead, and Tandridge.

As there are 358 Grade II* listed buildings in the county they have been split into separate lists for each district.

Grade II* is the mid-rank. Grade II is the initial rank with many more such buildings and particularly other structures, and Grade I is reserved to a very low percentage of buildings nationwide.

- Grade II* listed buildings in Spelthorne (12)
- Grade II* listed buildings in Runnymede (district) (20)
- Grade II* listed buildings in Surrey Heath (5)
- Grade II* listed buildings in Woking (district) (19)
- Grade II* listed buildings in Elmbridge (23)
- Grade II* listed buildings in Guildford (borough) (42)
- Grade II* listed buildings in Mole Valley (50)
- Grade II* listed buildings in Waverley, Surrey (95)
- Grade II* listed buildings in Epsom and Ewell (17)
- Grade II* listed buildings in Reigate and Banstead (23)
- Grade II* listed buildings in Tandridge (district) (52)

== See also ==
- Grade I listed buildings in Surrey
