= Billy Bostock =

Scottish footballer

Personal information
- Date of birth: 7 August 1943
- Place of birth: Inverkeithing, Scotland
- Date of death: 1996 (aged 51)
- Positions: Forward; utility player

Senior career*
Years	Team	Apps	(Gls)
–1967	Jubilee Athletic		
1967–1974	Cowdenbeath	199	(70)
- Lochgelly Albert
- * Club domestic league appearances and goals

Billy Bostock (7 August 1943 – 1996) was a Scottish footballer who played as a forward in the Scottish League for Cowdenbeath.

== Honours ==
Cowdenbeath

- Scottish League Second Division second-place promotion: 1969–70

Individual

- Cowdenbeath Hall of Fame
