= David Bostock (philosopher) =

British philosopher (1936–2019)

David Bostock (1936 – 29 October 2019) was a British philosopher and a Fellow of Merton College, Oxford.

== Life and career ==
Bostock was one of four children of Edward and Alice Bostock. He was educated at Amesbury School in Hindhead, Surrey, and at Charterhouse School. He undertook his National Service (1955-57), serving as a 2nd Lieutenant in the Surrey Regiment.

Having read Literae Humaniores at St John's College, Oxford, and after stipendiary posts at Leicester University (1963), the Australian National University at Canberra (1964) and Harvard University (1967), Bostock served as a Fellow and Tutor in philosophy at Merton College, Oxford between 1968 and his retirement in 2004. Bostock was subsequently an Emeritus Fellow of Merton College until his death on 29 October 2019.

== Family ==
In 1961 Bostock married, first, Jenny Lawton (died 1996), by whom he had two children, Timothy and Penelope. In 2002 he married, secondly, Rosanne, the daughter of Colonel Atherton George ffolliott Powell.

== Reputation ==
Following Bostock's death, a contemporary philosopher wrote of him:

His philosophical breadth was great, and his work was always characterised by clarity and precision. It was presented in a way that compelled the reader's interest – very often the reader's consent as well … he continued to think about philosophical issues until perhaps a year before he died. Then he decided that he had not read enough literature, and undertook a programme of reading all the books on his bookshelves, in the order in which they happened to have been placed.

== Works ==
Bostock wrote extensively on a range of philosophical issues, with particular focus on ancient philosophy. His publications included:

- Logic and Arithmetic Vol 1 (Oxford, Clarendon Press, 1974)
- Logic and Arithmetic Vol 2 (Oxford, Clarendon Press, 1979)
- Plato's Phaedo (Oxford, Clarendon Press, 1986)
- Plato's Theaetetus (Oxford, Clarendon Press, 1988)
- Aristotle's Metaphysics: Books Z and H (Oxford, Clarendon Press, 1994)
- Introduction and notes in Aristotle's Aristotle's Physics (translated by Robin Waterfield) (Oxford, Oxford University Press, 1996)
- Intermediate Logic (Oxford, Clarendon Press, 1997),
- Aristotle's Ethics (New York, Oxford University Press, 2000)
- On Motivating Higher-Order Logic, in Studies in the Philosophy of Logic and Knowledge (ed. Baldwin & Smiley, Oxford University Press, 2004)
- "The Interpretation of Plato's Crito" in Plato’s Euthyphro, Apology, and Crito (ed. Kamtekar; Rowman & Littlefield, 2005)
- Space, Time, Matter, and Form: Essays on Aristotle's Physics (Oxford, Clarendon Press, 2006)
- Philosophy of Mathematics: An Introduction (Chichester, Wiley-Blackwell, 2009)
- Aristotle's Philosophy of Mathematics, in The Oxford Handbook of Aristotle (ed. Shields; Oxford, Oxford University Press, 2012)
- Russell's Logical Atomism (Oxford, Oxford University Press, 2012)
