= Bostock =

Bostock may refer to:

- Bostock, Cheshire, a village and civil parish in Cheshire, England
- Bostock (surname), a surname (including a list of persons with the name)
- Bostock Hall, a country house in England
- Bostock Island, an island in the Pacific Ocean
- Bostock v. Clayton County, a 2020 decision of the Supreme Court of the United States dealing with discrimination of employees due to sexual orientation
- Bostock, a pastry made of stale brioche

== See also ==
- Bostock's Cup, British comedy drama from 1999
- Bostock Library, one of the Duke University Libraries, US
- Bostock Chambers, an office building in Australia
- Bostick (disambiguation)
- Vostok (disambiguation), including Восток
