= Sion Record Bostick =

- Born: December 7, 1819; Montgomery, Alabama
- Died: October 15, 1902 (aged 82); San Saba, Texas
- Known for: Soldier in the Texas Revolution, Mexican–American War, and the American Civil War

Sion Record Bostick (7 December 1819 – 15 October 1902) was a soldier for the Texas Army during the Texas Revolution, and later fought for the Confederate States Army during the American Civil War. Bostick is most famous as one of the Texas Army scouts who captured Antonio López de Santa Anna during the Texas Revolution.

== Early life ==
Bostick was born in Montgomery, Alabama on 7 December 1819. His father, Levi Bostick, was granted land by Stephen F. Austin in what was to become Matagorda County, Texas. Levi moved to Texas on 24 July 1824, and his family followed in 1828.

In 1829, the Bostick family moved to San Felipe. They again moved in 1832, this time to Colorado County near the present town of Columbus, Texas.

== Texas revolution ==
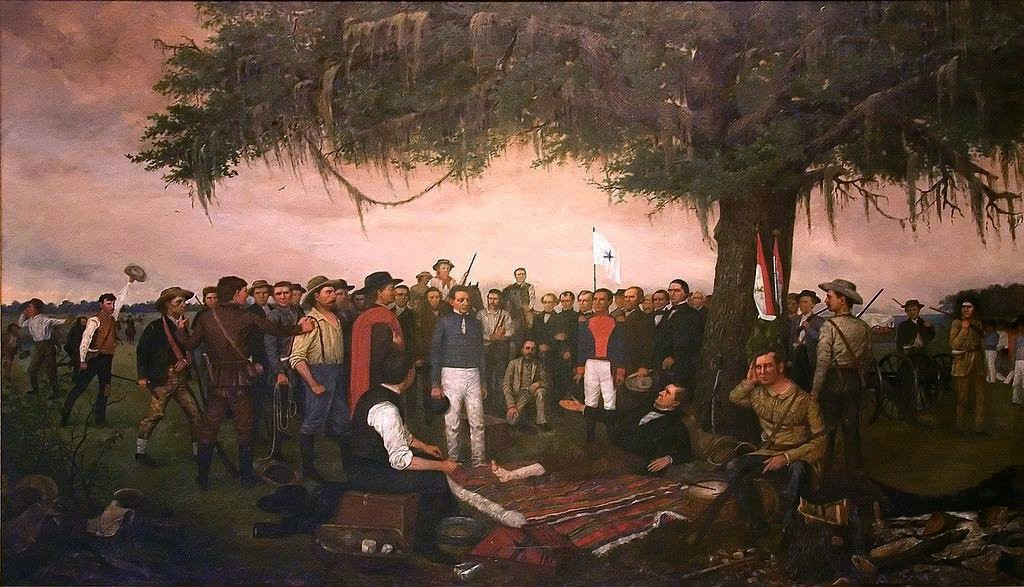
Surrender of Santa Anna by William Henry Huddle

Sion Bostick enlisted in the Texas Army at the age of 15. In 1835, he took part in the Battle of Gonzales, and later that year he fought at the Siege of Béxar.

When Mexican General Antonio López de Santa Anna marched into Texas in 1836, Bostick reenlisted as a private in Col. Edward Burleson's First Regiment of Texas Volunteers. On 21 April 1836, he fought in the Battle of San Jacinto.

The day after the Battle of San Jacinto, Captain Moseley Baker ordered Bostick and two other soldiers (Washington H. Secrest and James A. Sylvester) to scout around the prairie in search of escaping Mexican soldiers. They spotted and captured a Mexican soldier hiding in tall grass. Upon returning to camp, they discovered that their prisoner was the Mexican President and General Antonio López de Santa Anna. Bostick noted in his memoirs that:

When we got to camp, the Mexican soldiers, then prisoners, saluted him and said, "el presidente." We knew then that we had made a big haul.

Sion later accounted his story for the Texas historical association in 1901;

I was at home at Columbus, but on the 21st day of March, after the Alamo had fallen and Fannin and his men had been massacred, I reenlisted at Columbus under Captain Moseley Baker, who had a company in Colonel Ed. Burleson's regiment of Houston's army, then retreating before the victorious Mexicans. Baker's company was sent to San Felipe to guard it, and Houston's army crossed the Brazos above San Felipe at Groce's (Ferry). My company crossed the Brazos at San Felipe and threw up some little fortifications. After the Mexicans crossed the Colorado river General Houston ordered us to cross over the river and burn San Felipe. The people had already abandoned the place, leaving everything they had in the houses and stores. We obeyed our orders, but remained in camp on the east side of the Brazes opposite San Felipe, and placed a picket guard on the west side to give notice of the approach of the Mexicans.

In a few days, the Mexicans came up. One morning about sunrise they captured Simpson, one of our pickets. The other three pickets, Jack (James) Bell, I. L. Hill, and George W. Pettus got away and crossed the river in a dugout. We had some skirmish firing across the river at them. We would not let them cross, and they went down the Brazos and crossed at Richmond. We were ordered to join Houston at Donoho's below Groce's outside of the Brazos bottom in the edge of the prairie. The scouts reported that Santa Anna had gone down to Harrisburg on Buffalo bayou, where he never halted, but, after burning the place, moved on down the bayou to a point opposite the San Jacinto river, or rather below there. Houston's army followed, found Harrisburg burned up, moved on down the bayou, and went into camp just above the mouth of the San Jacinto river. The Mexicans came back up the river and some skirmishing took place on the 20th. They camped that night not far from Houston's army. The next day in the evening Houston ordered us to attack the Mexicans. Sherman on the left commenced the fight. We were all on foot except a small cavalry force under Lamar. We moved down a slope slowly, but when we started up a long sloping ridge (the Mexican breastworks were on the top of it), we all went in double quick. Everyone of us was yelling: 'Remember the Alamo! Remember Fannin!' In a little while the Mexicans broke and ran. Just back of there was low marshy land and a kind of lake. Many of them tried to cross, but they bogged down, and we shot them. A few got through, and we captured them next day.

Captain Moseley Baker told me on the morning of the 22nd to scout around on the prairie and see if I could find any escaping Mexicans. I went and fell in with two other scouts, one of whom was named Joel Robinson, and the other Henry Sylvester. We had horses that we had captured from the Mexicans. When we were about eight miles from the battle field, about one o'clock, we saw the head and shoulders of a man above the tall sedge grass, walking through the prairie. As soon as we saw him we started towards him in a gallop. When he discovered us, he squatted in the grass; but we soon came to the place. As we rode up we aimed at him and told him to surrender. He held up his hands and spoke in Spanish, but I could not understand him. He was dressed a common soldier with dingy looking white uniform. Under the uniform he had on a fine shirt. As we went back to camp the prisoner rode behind Robinson awhile and then rode behind Sylvester. I was the youngest and smallest of the party, and I would not agree to let him ride behind me. I wanted to shoot him. We did not know who he was. He was tolerably dark skinned, weighed about one hundred and forty-five pounds, and wore side whiskers. When we got to camp, the Mexican soldiers, then prisoners, saluted him and said 'el presidente.' We knew then that we had made a big haul. All three of us who had captured him were angry at ourselves for not killing him out on the prairie to be consumed by the wolves and buzzards. We took him to General Houston, who was wounded and lying under a big oak tree.

The remainder of the story of the battle others have told. It is history. I have told what I saw as a young private; I was not seventeen years old. The causes of the discontent and the troubles with Mexico I did not then know. History tells all that. As a boy all I knew was that we had a row on our hands, and they wanted to fight. I thought I could kill Mexicans as easily as I could deer and turkeys. In 1842 I helped General Burleson whip the Comanches at Plum Creek fight, and in 1848, during the Mexican War, I went out again under Claiborne Herbert. Still later, in 1861, I went again, this time to Virginia, and served in Hood's brigade in the Fifth Texas. During the war with Spain I was very much troubled because I was too old to go......

Sion Bostick can be seen in the painting Surrender of Santa Anna by William Henry Huddle, which depicts Santa Anna surrendering to a wounded Sam Houston. The painting is on display in the Texas State Capitol in Austin.

== Mexican American War and the Civil War ==
Bostick was living in Colorado County in 1840, and he fought in the Battle of Plum Creek. He claimed to have served in the Mexican–American War in Company E of Col. John Coffee Hays's First Texas Mounted Rifles. Although the Company was recruited in Columbus County, Bostick's name does not appear on the Company's muster roll.

On 21 March 1862, Bostick enlisted in the Fifth Texas Infantry regiment of the famed Hood's Texas Brigade at the age of 42. He served in Virginia and fought in the Battle of Antietam. Five days after the battle at Antietam, Bostick was discharged by the secretary of war because he was deemed too old to fight.

== Personal life and later years ==
Sion Bostick married Susan Townsend (22 November 1823 - 27 February 1860) on 4 April 1839. They had seven children. The couple divorced in 1856. Bostick later married Mary Indiana Rhodes (1841–1917) on 3 October 1858.

In 1864 Bostick was charged with attacking a slave named Joseph with a 'sharp stick'. The charges were eventually dropped.

Bostick spent his later years at his home in San Saba, Texas. He was a member of the Texas Veteran's Association. At the age of 80, he dictated his memoirs of the Texas Revolution, which were published in 1901 in the Southwestern Historical Quarterly. Sion Bostick died of cancer in San Saba on 15 October 1902.

== Texas Historical Marker ==
In 1973, a Historical Marker was erected in honor of Sion Bostick in San Saba, Texas near his grave site. The text of the marker reads:

Sion Record Bostick. (December 7, 1819-October 15, 1902) A member of the party of young Texans who captured the escaping Mexican General Santa Anna after Battle of San Jacinto, during the Texas War for Independence. Migrated from Alabama in 1828. Served in Texas army at Gonzales and Bexar (San Antonio), 1835; at San Jacinto, 1836; and 1840 stand against Comanches, at Plum Creek. An American soldier in Mexican War, 1846; a Confederate in Hood's Brigade in the Civil War, 1860s. Married Susan Townsend; after her death, Mary Indiana Rhodes. Had several children. Became a leader in veterans reunions. He is buried in San Saba Cemetery.
