= Hugh Bostock =

British neuroscientist (born 1944)

Hugh Bostock FRS (born 25 August 1944) is a British neuroscientist, and Emeritus Professor of Neurophysiology, at University College, London.

== Life ==
He was educated at Charterhouse School and earned a BA from Merton College, Oxford in 1966, and MSc and PhD in 1974 from University of London.

== Works ==
- H. Bostock; P. A. Kirkwood; A. H. Pullen, eds. (1996). The neurobiology of disease: contributions from neuroscience to clinical neurology. Cambridge University Press. ISBN 978-0-521-45132-1.
