= Amesbury School =

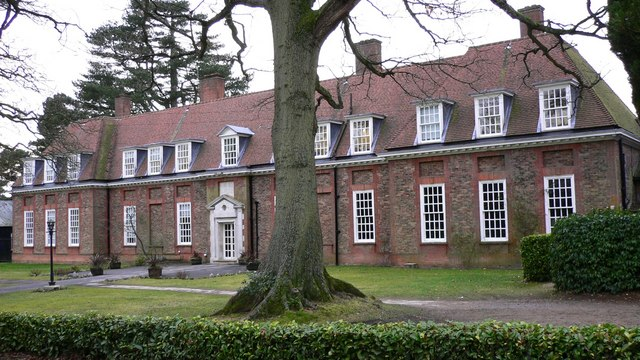

Location
- Hazel Grove; Hindhead, Surrey, GU26 6BL; England; 51.1008°N 0.74276°W

Information
- Type: Independent school Day and boarding school Co-educational
- Motto: Nitere ut Vincas
- Established: 1870
- Founder: Revd. Edmund Fowle
- Local authority: Surrey
- Department for Education URN: 125346 Tables
- Chair: Craig Decker
- Head: Gavin Franklin
- Gender: Coeducational
- Age: 9 months to 13 years
- Enrolment: 339 (2017)
- Houses: Henwood an Lawson
- Colours: Navy, brown and green
- Website: http://www.amesburyschool.co.uk/

Amesbury School is a co-educational independent prep school in the Hindhead/Haslemere area of Surrey, England. It was founded in 1870 and educates pupils between the ages of 9 months and 13 years. Sir Edwin Lutyens designed the Grade II*-listed main building, which stands on a 34-acre (140,000 m^{2}) In August 2026 Amesbury School will join the Charterhouse family of schools.

== Ethos ==
Amesbury was ISI Inspected in September 2017 and was awarded 'Excellent' within every category.

== History ==
Reverend Edmund Fowle, the son of the vicar of Amesbury, Wiltshire – Rev. Fulwar William Fowle – founded hisni' school in 1870 in Redhill in Surrey, as Amesbury House. It moved to Reigate a year later and then, in 1876, it moved again, this time to a seven-acre site in Bickley, Kent. All of these moves were due to growing pupil numbers.

In 1887 Amesbury House was sold to E. H. Moore who ran it in partnership with E. A. Thompson until 1889 when the latter migrated to South Africa. Continuing success entailed another move and Bickley House was bought in 1902. At this point the school's name changed to that which it bears today. Moore died a year later and in The Old Amesburians Club instituted a prize in his memory which is still awarded.

The school moved to its current location in Hindhead at the end of 1917, under the headmastership of E. Cotgreave Brown. The reason on this occasion was to be further away from the dangers of London in war-time and to benefit from the healthy atmosphere of a rural location. It also became full boarding.

The main school building was designed by Sir Edwin Lutyens in 1903. The building is classified as a Grade 2* structure as it was the earliest design completed by Lutyens in the Wren style. Of particular interest are the strainer arches in the upstairs passage and the small windows on the eastern western face of the building, small because Lutyens believed that a room should contain pools of light rather than overall brightness.

In 1920, Brown resigned and was replaced by C. L. MacDonald. By the autumn term of 1923, there were a then record 51 boarders. A neighbouring house called Bracklands was bought in 1927 and was to remain part of the school until 1979, housing classrooms, library, music and games room and some staff accommodation. MacDonald died in 1939,

The next headmaster, Major Tom Reynolds, took over the school in 1938 as MacDonald's health was failing. One of the first things he did was to help design the school chapel, which built during the summer holidays and dedicated on 2 October 1938 in the name of St Francis, by Reverend J.V. Macmillan, Bishop of Guildford. The wooden paneling covering the walls of the chancel was completed in 1942 and was a gift to the school from General Sir Bernard Montgomery and his son, David, who had been a pupil since 1936. Amesbury was 'home' for Montgomery and David during the 1940s and the Reynolds became David's guardians. King George V1 gave Montgomery his consent to allow the Amesbury Chapel Choir to wear scarlet cassocks.

By 1944 Amesbury had become Montgomery's Rear HQ. A plaque was put on the door of his room in the headmaster's house with the 21st Army Group sign and it was here and in the summerhouse in the remembrance garden that he was visited by his staff and generals. Here he also made his final plans for D-Day.

Realising how important it was that he should not, like Churchill, disappoint his generals, Monty decided to go down to Amesbury for a few days [the first week of April 1944]. There in the seclusion of the Reynolds' school, he cast his mind over the events and personalities with which and with whom he had been associated over the past three months. 'I have a lot of thinking to do and notes to make, and I would like to sit quietly alone on Saturday and most of Sunday too', he warned Reynolds.

On 5 June 1944, Montgomery dined at Amesbury before leaving for Normandy. That evening, Monty drove up to Hindhead to see the Reynolds and to make "final arrangements" regarding David. Reynolds retired four years later, being replaced as headmaster by A. G. Peel.

The school's centenary year, 1970, was a year of extreme difficulty and a crucial one in Amesbury's history. After a long period of good pupil numbers and a virtually unchanged staff, changes began to happen. Peel was himself reaching an age when he could reasonably think of retiring and there had been one or two abortive attempts to find a suitable successor to take over the school. Eventually the parents formed a committee, chaired by H. H. Rose, and looked into the possibility of turning the school into an Educational Trust. By May the £25,000 minimum required had been assured by interest free loans and donations: the school became an Educational Trust and a board of governors was appointed, with Peel continuing as headmaster until a replacement could be found. Today the main academic scholarship is named 'The Rose Scholarship'.

During this uncertain time, numbers in the school suffered and by the time Dominick Spencer became the school's first salaried headmaster in 1971, there were only 59 boys in the school. The next three years saw numbers steadily rise: full boarding continued but day boys were welcomed and weekly boarding was started for the younger pupils. With numbers steadily increasing, the school was back on a sound financial footing and the governors felt able to start some much needed improvements.

The old theatre was now too small and the gymnasium was converted to act as a centre for PT, fencing, badminton, theatre and cinema. In 1973, with Science due to become a compulsory subject in Common Entrance, a dedicated teaching facility was needed. The early 1980s saw the stable block converted for staff accommodation and the old vegetable garden became grass tennis courts until 1987 when the all-weather hard courts were built. A new teaching block was added in 1987 housing classrooms, art room and a new science lab. In 1995, the main entrance was renamed Spencers as a tribute to Dominick and Sue Spencer, who retired in 1989 and were succeeded until 1994 by Paul Cheater.

In 1987 Amesbury opened a Pre-Prep Department catering for pupils under seven.

== Former Heads ==
- E. Cotgreave Brown 1917
- Jonathan Whybrow 2010
- Nigel Taylor 2017
