= David Bostock (diplomat) =

British diplomat

Sir David John Bostock, KCMG (11 April 1948 – 3 September 2016) was a British diplomat.

== Biography ==
David John Bostock was born on 11 April 1948, the son of John C. Bostock and his wife, Gwendoline G. Bostock, née Lee. After attending Cheltenham Grammar School, Bostock went up to Balliol College, Oxford, graduating with a Bachelor of Arts degree in 1969; he later completed a Master of Science degree in the Economics of Public Policy at University College London in 1978.

Bostock joined the Civil Service in 1971, working for the Treasury. He was Second Secretary to the Office of the Permanent Representative to the European Economic Community from 1973 to 1975 and then a Principal at the Treasury until 1981. After two years with the Cabinet Office, he returned to the Treasury as an Assistant Secretary and then, in 1985, was posted as Financial and Economic Counsellor to the Office of the Permanent Representative to the European Community. In 1990, he became Under Secretary at the Treasury then, in 1995, he was posted as Deputy Permanent Representative to the European Union. In 1999, he became Head of the European Secretariat to the Cabinet Office. After spending a year as a visiting fellow at the London School of Economics (2000–01), he was appointed a Member of the European Court of Auditors in 2002, retiring in 2013. Having been appointed a Companion of the Order of St Michael and St George (CMG) in 1998, he was advanced to Knight Commander of the Order in 2015 (KCMG).

Shortly before his death he filmed two episodes of the 2016–17 season of University Challenge as a member of the SOAS, University of London team. He had been studying for a Master of Arts degree in South East Asian Studies at SOAS. The episodes aired after his death and were followed by a dedication.

Bostock was Chairman of the Museum of Richmond in south-west London.
