= Church Hill House, Haslemere =

House in Surrey, England

Church Hill House
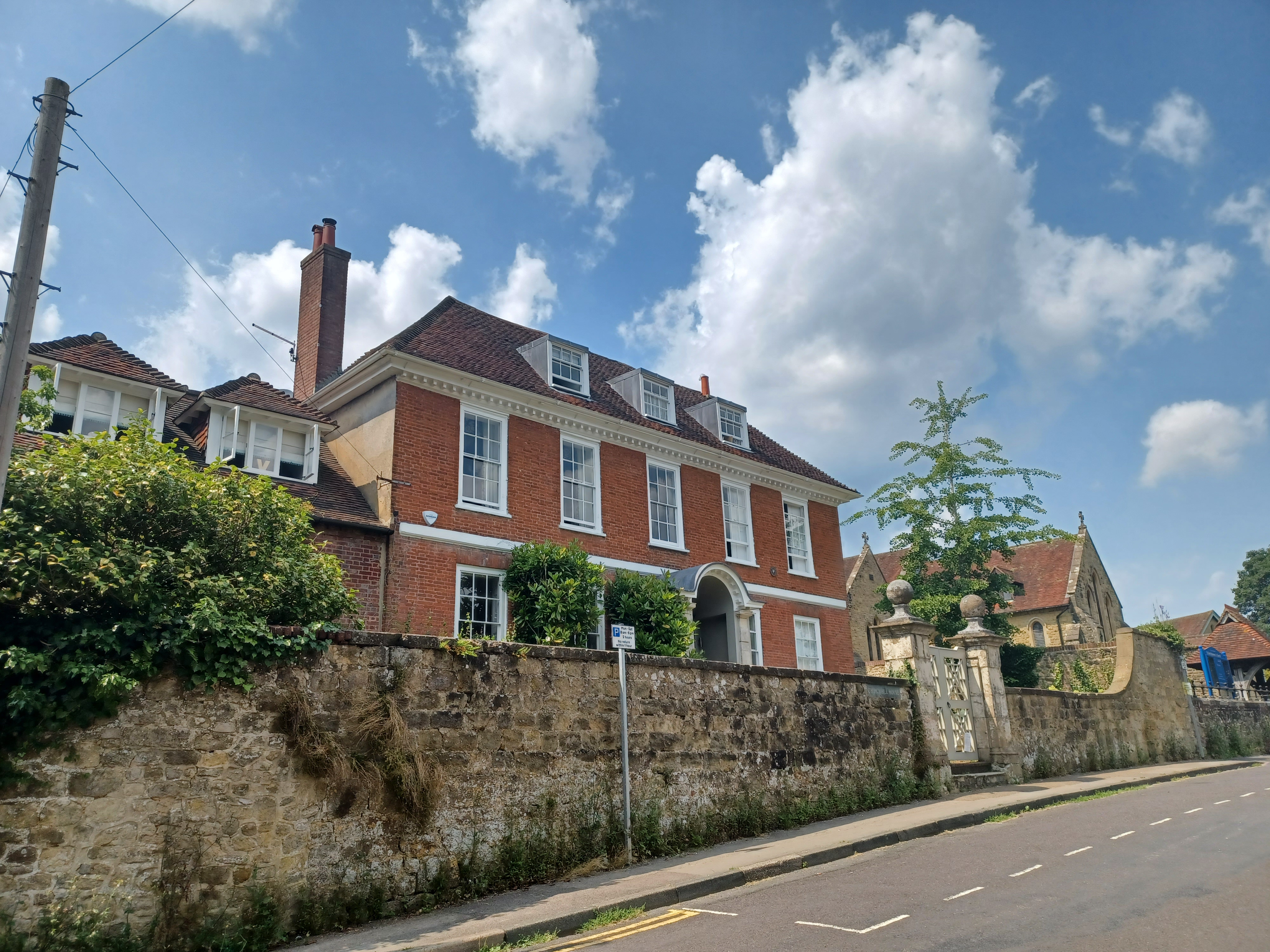

- Location within Surrey
- 51°05′34″N 0°42′42″W
- Location: Haslemere, Surrey
- OS grid reference: SU 90314 33386

History
- Built: 18th century

Listed Building – Grade II*
- Official name: Church Hill House
- Designated: 3 December 1953
- Reference no.: 1243900

Church Hill House is a grade II* listed house in Tanners Lane, Haslemere, Surrey. Parts of the walls are grade II listed as well as the adjoining Church Hill Gate.
