= Thomas Edward Bostock =

Australian politician

Thomas Edward Bostock (also known as T.E. Bostock) was Geelong's mayor from 1905 to 1908 and served on Council from 1898 to 1912. He also established the Barwon Heads Golf Club early in the century.
