= Grade I listed buildings in London =

There are over 9,000 Grade I listed buildings in England. Greater London is divided into 32 boroughs and the City of London and contains 589 of these structures. The buildings have been split into separate lists for each district. There are no Grade I listed buildings in the London Borough of Waltham Forest.

The City of London and the 32 London boroughs
1. City of London; 2. City of Westminster; 3. Kensington and Chelsea; 4. Hammersmith and Fulham; 5. Wandsworth; 6. Lambeth; 7. Southwark; 8. Tower Hamlets; 9. Hackney; 10. Islington; 11. Camden; 12. Brent; 13. Ealing; 14. Hounslow; 15. Richmond; 16. Kingston; 17. Merton	18. Sutton; 19. Croydon; 20. Bromley; 21. Lewisham; 22. Greenwich; 23. Bexley; 24. Havering; 25. Barking and Dagenham; 26. Redbridge; 27. Newham; 28. Waltham Forest; 29. Haringey; 30. Enfield; 31. Barnet; 32. Harrow; 33. Hillingdon

== See also ==
- Grade II* listed buildings in London
- Grade II listed buildings in London
- Listed buildings in England
