= Grade II* listed buildings in London =

London is divided into 32 boroughs and the City of London. As there are 1,387 Grade II* listed buildings in London they have been split into separate lists for each borough.

The City of London and the 32 London boroughs
1. City of London; 2. City of Westminster (1–9 and A–Z); 3. Kensington and Chelsea; 4. Hammersmith and Fulham; 5. Wandsworth; 6. Lambeth; 7. Southwark; 8. Tower Hamlets; 9. Hackney; 10. Islington; 11. Camden; 12. Brent; 13. Ealing; 14. Hounslow; 15. Richmond; 16. Kingston; 17. Merton	18. Sutton; 19. Croydon; 20. Bromley; 21. Lewisham; 22. Greenwich; 23. Bexley; 24. Havering; 25. Barking and Dagenham; 26. Redbridge; 27. Newham; 28. Waltham Forest; 29. Haringey; 30. Enfield; 31. Barnet; 32. Harrow; 33. Hillingdon

== See also ==
- Grade I listed buildings in London
- Grade II listed buildings in London
- Category:Grade II* listed buildings in London
