= Grade I and II* listed buildings in the London Borough of Enfield =

There are over 9,000 Grade I listed buildings and 20,000 Grade II* listed buildings in England. This page is a list of these buildings in the London Borough of Enfield.

== Grade I ==
Name	Location	Type	Completed (Note: The date given is the date used by Historic England as significant for the initial building or that of an important part in the structure's description.)	Date designated	Grid ref. (Note: Sometimes known as OSGB36, the grid reference is based on the British national grid reference system used by the Ordnance Survey.) Geo-coordinates	Entry number (Note: The "List Entry Number" is a unique number assigned to each listed building and scheduled monument by Historic England.)	Image
Forty Hall	Forty Hill, Enfield	House	1629–1636	19 March 1951	TQ3364098561; 51°40′12″N 0°04′08″W	1294469	Forty Hall More images
Forty Hall Screen wall, gateway and north pavilions	Forty Hill, Enfield	Gate	c. 1630	19 March 1951	TQ3366598576; 51°40′12″N 0°04′07″W	1079565	Forty Hall Screen wall, gateway and north pavilions More images
Grovelands Park Hospital (original Block Only)	Enfield	Hospital	1797	31 January 1974	TQ3038694275; 51°37′56″N 0°07′03″W	1078925	Grovelands Park Hospital (original Block Only) More images

== Grade II* ==
Name	Location	Type	Completed	Date designated	Grid ref. Geo-coordinates	Entry number	Image
Arnos Grove Underground station	Enfield	Underground Railway Station	Opened 1932	19 February 1971	TQ2932092482; 51°36′59″N 0°08′01″W	1358981	Arnos Grove Underground station More images
Arnoside House and Essex House	Southgate, Enfield	House	Early 18th century	12 June 1950	TQ2981993475; 51°37′30″N 0°07′34″W	1358705	Arnoside House and Essex House More images
Forecourt Walls, Railings and Gates to Number 4 (Essex House) and Number 5 (Arnoside House)	Southgate, Enfield	Gate	Early 18th century	31 January 1974	TQ2982893456; 51°37′30″N 0°07′33″W	1079535	Forecourt Walls, Railings and Gates to Number 4 (Essex House) and Number 5 (Arnoside House)
Broomfield House, Broomfield Park	Enfield	House	Early 18th century	12 June 1950	TQ3045292653; 51°37′03″N 0°07′02″W	1078934	Broomfield House, Broomfield Park More images
Broomfield House East wall, garden house and stable block	Enfield	Gate	Mid 16th century	12 June 1950	TQ3045492548; 51°37′00″N 0°07′02″W	1188544	Broomfield House East wall, garden house and stable block
Capel Manor College	Enfield	House	Mid-late 18th century	19 March 1951	TQ3434299687; 51°40′48″N 0°03′30″W	1078898	Capel Manor College More images
Christ Church Southgate	Southgate, Enfield	Parish Church	1861	12 June 1950	TQ2968393418; 51°37′29″N 0°07′41″W	1294372	Christ Church Southgate More images
Church of All Saints	Edmonton, Enfield	Church	12th century	10 April 1954	TQ3398293660; 51°37′33″N 0°03′57″W	1079548	Church of All Saints More images
Church of St Andrew's	Enfield	Church	1800	19 March 1951	TQ3278196656; 51°39′11″N 0°04′55″W	1079549	Church of St Andrew's More images
Church of St Mary Magdalene	Windmill Hill, Enfield	Church	1897–1899	31 January 1974	TQ3173196750; 51°39′15″N 0°05′50″W	1294385	Church of St Mary Magdalene More images
Clarendon Cottage	Enfield	House	17th century	19 March 1951	TQ3247296791; 51°39′16″N 0°05′11″W	1079527	Clarendon Cottage More images
Formerly Arnos Grove Southgate House (central section)	Enfield	House	1722	12 June 1950	TQ3001393238; 51°37′23″N 0°07′24″W	1294639	Formerly Arnos Grove Southgate House (central section) More images
Lamb's Cottage	Edmonton, Enfield	House	Late 17th century or early 18th century	14 January 1950	TQ3419493647; 51°37′32″N 0°03′46″W	1188759	Lamb's Cottage More images
Millfield House	Upper Edmonton, Enfield	Country House	Late 18th century	31 January 1974	TQ3301292539; 51°36′57″N 0°04′49″W	1079504	Millfield House More images
Enfield Grammar School North East Building	Enfield	School	Late 16th century	19 March 1951	TQ3274596662; 51°39′11″N 0°04′57″W	1079551	Enfield Grammar School North East Building
Oakwood Underground station	Enfield	Booking Office	Built 1933	19 February 1971	TQ2933895972; 51°38′52″N 0°07′55″W	1078930	Oakwood Underground station More images
St John the Evangelist, Palmers Green, with Parish Room	Palmer's Green, Enfield	Church	1907–1908	31 January 1974	TQ3129493350; 51°37′25″N 0°06′17″W	1078929	St John the Evangelist, Palmers Green, with Parish Room More images
Salisbury House	Enfield	House	Modern	10 April 1954	TQ3335094515; 51°38′01″N 0°04′29″W	1188620	Salisbury House More images
Southgate House	Southgate, Enfield	House	Late 18th century	12 June 1950	TQ2974993946; 51°37′46″N 0°07′37″W	1079541	Southgate House More images
Southgate Underground station	Southgate, Enfield	Underground station	1933	19 February 1971	TQ2967194269; 51°37′56″N 0°07′40″W	1188692	Southgate Underground station More images
Southgate Underground station Pylons	Southgate, Enfield	Lamp post, sign and seat	1933	19 February 1971	51°37′57″N 0°07′41″W	1359011	Southgate Underground station Pylons More images
The Hermitage Stable block	Cannon Hill, Southgate	House	Late 17th century or early 18th century	19 March 1951	TQ3353098244; 51°40′02″N 0°04′14″W	1189040	The Hermitage Stable block More images
The Paddocks	Crews Hill, Enfield	Farmhouse	Early-Mid 17th century	9 December 1983	TL3103600506; 51°41′17″N 0°06′21″W	1100968	Upload Photo
