= Grade I and II* listed buildings in the Royal Borough of Kingston upon Thames =

There are over 9,000 Grade I listed buildings and 20,000 Grade II* listed buildings in England. This page is a list of these buildings in the Royal Borough of Kingston upon Thames.

== Grade I ==
Name	Location	Type	Completed (Note: The date given is the date used by Historic England as significant for the initial building or that of an important part in the structure's description.)	Date designated	Grid ref. (Note: The grid reference is based on the British national grid reference system, sometimes known as OSGB36, used by the Ordnance Survey.) Geo-coordinates	Entry number (Note: The "List Entry Number" is a unique number assigned to each listed building and scheduled monument by Historic England.)	Image
Church of All Saints	Kingston upon Thames	Church	Norman	30 July 1951	TQ1790369300; 51°24′38″N 0°18′22″W	1358437	Church of All Saints More images
Clattern Bridge	Kingston upon Thames	Bridge	12th century with later alterations	30 July 1951	TQ1786169094; 51°24′31″N 0°18′24″W	1080064	Clattern Bridge More images
Coronation Stone	Kingston upon Thames	Balustrade	Mid 19th century	6 October 1983	TQ1786769069; 51°24′30″N 0°18′24″W	1080066	Coronation Stone More images

== Grade II* ==
Name	Location	Type	Completed	Date designated	Grid ref. Geo-coordinates	Entry number	Image
Chantry Chapel of St Mary Magdalene	Kingston upon Thames	School	1951	30 July 1951	TQ1857569358; 51°24′39″N 0°17′47″W	1358425	Chantry Chapel of St Mary Magdalene More images
Church of St Raphael	Kingston upon Thames	Church	1847-8	24 December 1968	TQ1782368365; 51°24′08″N 0°18′27″W	1080045	Church of St Raphael More images
Cleave's Almshouses	Kingston upon Thames	Almshouse	1668	30 July 1951	TQ1847669366; 51°24′39″N 0°17′52″W	1184584	Cleave's Almshouses More images
Coombe Conduit House	Kingston upon Thames	Tunnel	1538–1540	30 May 1951	TQ2049469841; 51°24′53″N 0°16′07″W	1080099	Coombe Conduit House
Druid's Head Public House	Kingston upon Thames	Public House	17th century	6 October 1983	TQ1788369161; 51°24′33″N 0°18′23″W	1184751	Druid's Head Public House More images
Gallows Conduit House (in Grounds of Hampton Spring)	Kingston upon Thames	Conduit House	1538–1540	30 May 1951	TQ2004670220; 51°25′06″N 0°16′30″W	1080062	Upload Photo
Kingston Bridge	Kingston upon Thames	Bridge	1825-8	30 July 1951	TQ1773669370; 51°24′40″N 0°18′31″W	1300232	Kingston Bridge More images
Market House	Kingston upon Thames	Building	1706	10 June 1983	TQ1789569226; 51°24′35″N 0°18′23″W	1358428	Market House More images
105 London Road	Kingston upon Thames	Building	Late C17/C18	6 October 1983	TQ1857169361; 51°24′39″N 0°17′47″W	1184600	105 London Road
37–41 High Street	Kingston upon Thames	House	16th century	30 July 1951	TQ1780268900; 51°24′25″N 0°18′28″W	1358459	37–41 High Street More images
Picton House	Kingston upon Thames	House	1740s	20 February 1970	TQ1778168961; 51°24′27″N 0°18′29″W	1080069	Picton House More images
