= Crooked Billet =

Area in southwest London, England, in the London Borough of Merton

Coordinates: 51°25′17″N 00°13′39″W

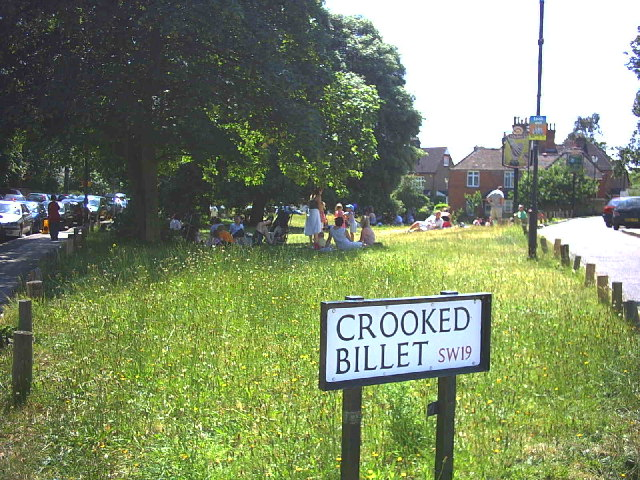

- Location within Greater London
- London borough: Merton
- Ceremonial county: Greater London
- Region: London
- Country: England
- Sovereign state: United Kingdom
- Post town: London
- Postcode district: SW19
- Dialling code: 020
- Police: Metropolitan
- Fire: London
- Ambulance: London
- UK Parliament: Wimbledon
- London Assembly: Merton and Wandsworth

Crooked Billet, also known as Shepherd's Hatch Gate, (Note: Occasionally and erroneously called "Cromwell's Half Acre.") is a hamlet which forms part of Wimbledon Common and incorporates its own commons. The district encompasses a small area in southwest London, England, in the London Borough of Merton. The area is regarded as a popular greenspot and an adjunct to events in Wimbledon.

== History ==
Crooked Billet is a small corner of Wimbledon Common with a green, housing mainly in the form of houses, and two public houses. Contrasting with adjoining developed environs, it has maintained its core "identity as a semi-rural enclave". Formerly, it encompassed grazing land, cottages and farm buildings; surviving parts hark back to at least the 17th century. Currently, the public houses host various events, and the Wimbledon Morrismen perform there. A 1617 survey calls it "Shepherd's Hatch Gate" which refers to gates for grazing livestock. A cottage was occupied by Richard Atkins who cultivated one of the fields south of the Ridgway.

It is a small, rather obscure area on the southern edge of Wimbledon Common. One theory is that it is named after the Crooked Billet pub (Note: Quite apart from the location or the present pub, "Crooked Billet" was (and is) a very common pub and inn name. In its most generic form, it refers to a bent staff or branch that has fallen from a tree or ready to be split. There were at least five around London in the 18th century — which then arguably carried a connotation disparaging the presumed clientele.) which was first mentioned in 1509. Both the pub and the area are well regarded. Along with the Hand in Hand pub, it faces onto a small triangular green. Nearby can be found King's College School. (Note: The origin of the name is disputed.) Eagle House and Wimbledon House are also in the vicinity.

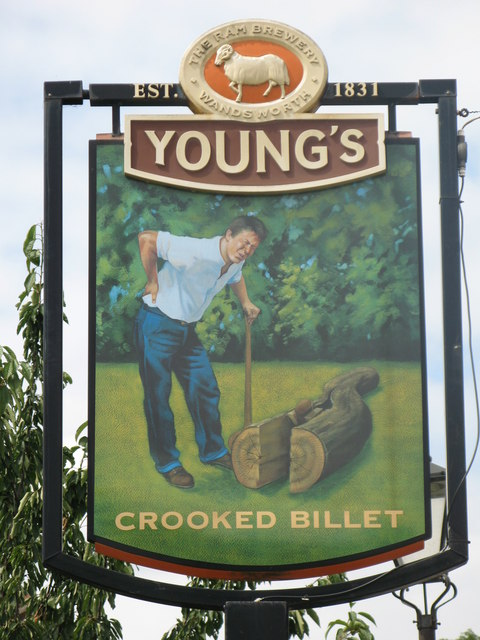

After his son died in the Great Plague of London, Robert Pennington, a friend of Charles II, built Southside House (on nearby Woodhayes Road) as a safe haven for his family.

In the 1770s, the "Cinque Cottages" were built on the green, perhaps as an illegal encroachment.

In the 1820s, Gothic House (later renamed Gothic Lodge) was home to novelist Captain Frederick Marryat. In 1874 it became the home of engineer Sir William Preece (Note: Sir William was the premier campaigner for electric street lighting in Wimbledon. His son, Arthur Preece, opened the town's first electricity power station in 1899.) who permitted use of his garden by Guglielmo Marconi to position a radio transmitter "used to send some of the earliest telegraph messages". It was the first house in London with a telephone and London's first house with electricity for illumination, boiling a kettle and ironing.

In the 1860s Earl Spencer was Lord of the Manor, and owner of Wimbledon Common. His stated intent to enclose the common land before selling it for building development led to the passage of the Wimbledon and Putney Commons Act 1871 (34 & 35 Vict. c. cciv). Consequently, the land is preserved as a commons and saved "for the public in perpetuity". A Board of Conservators manages the property.

In 1872, Sir Henry Peek of Wimbledon House, Parkside, constructed the "Cinque Cottages" which displaced the earlier cottages. The deed of trust provides for the beneficiaries to be "poor men of good character in needy circumstances" 54 years old or older who resided within one of 40 Surrey parishes. Peek played a signal role in passing the Commons Act. (Note: Sir Henry was a son of the founder of biscuit maker Peek Frean & Co.) He was a Member of Parliament for East Surrey from 1868 until 1884.

In 1888 Young's Brewery leased the Crooked Billet pub, and bought the freehold in 1928. In 1974 Young's purchased the Hand in Hand. After the pubs were enlarged and refurbished, they were sold in 2006. The pubs are separated from the green. In Wright's Alley, Shire horses historically pulled brewer's drays delivering ale to customers.

== Notable resident ==
- Imogen Hassall (1942–1980)
