= Crooked Billet, Wimbledon =

Pub in Wimbledon, London

The Crooked Billet
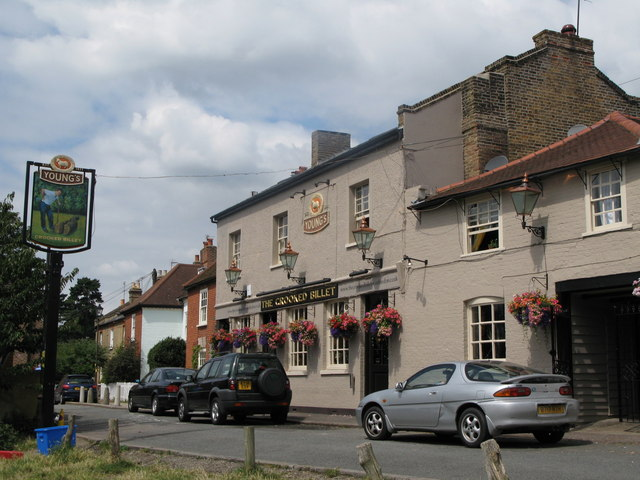
- The Crooked Billet

- Location within London Borough of Merton Location within Greater London

General information
- Location: 14–15 Crooked Billet Wimbledon Common, Wimbledon, London, London, England
- Coordinates: 51.4215°N 0.2278°W

The Crooked Billet is a pub at 14–15 Crooked Billet, facing onto Wimbledon Common, Wimbledon, London. The building dates from the early 18th century and became the Crooked Billet during the 1750s. The district of Wimbledon called Crooked Billet may have taken its name from the pub.

In 1888 Young's Brewery leased the Crooked Billet pub, and bought the freehold in 1928. In 1974 Young's Brewery purchased the nearby Hand in Hand. After the pubs were enlarged and refurbished, they were sold in 2006. The pubs are separated from the green. In Wright's Alley, ale was historically delivered to customers by Shire horses pulling brewer's drays.

Along with the Hand in Hand, the Crooked Billet faces onto a small triangular green. Nearby can be found King's College School. (Note: The origin of the name is disputed.) Eagle House and Wimbledon House are also in the vicinity.

The pub's cellars are said to be haunted by the ghost of an Irish woman.
