= William Tash =

- Born: c. 1746
- Died: 17 July 1816 (aged 69–70)
- Education: Eton College
- Occupation: Landowner
- Board member of: Weld Chapel, Southgate
- Spouse: Mary Jackson

William Tash (c.1746 - 17 July 1816) was a landowner in the parish of Edmonton, in the English county of Middlesex, now in Greater London. Educated at Eton College, he married into the Jackson family, thus acquiring Broomfield House and its estate. He held numerous other pieces of land in the parish, and in 1804 was its second largest landowner with 582 acres. He was also lord of the manor of Bowes and Dernsford, and a trustee of the Weld Chapel where he played a significant role in the dispute about the transfer of the living there in 1813. He is remembered in a monument that was transferred to Christ Church when the Weld Chapel was demolished.

== Early life and family ==
William Tash was born around 1746. He was educated at Eton College from 1755 to 1763, his home address being noted as Shenley Hill, Hertfordshire. He was still resident there when, in November 1772, he married Mary Jackson. She pre-deceased him in 1812, in her 73rd year.

== Parish of Edmonton ==
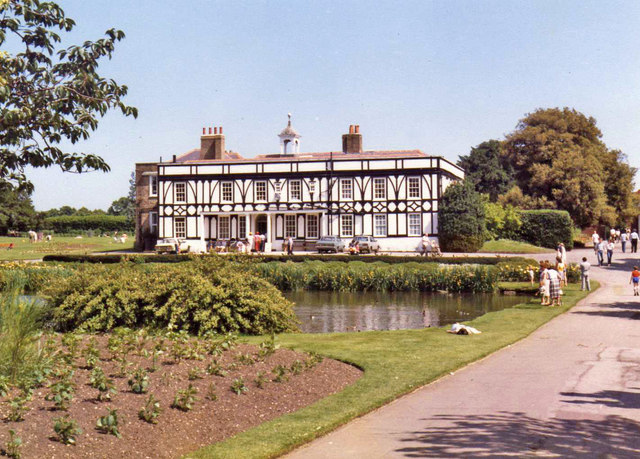
Broomfield House in 1981.

Tash acquired Broomfield House in Palmers Green in 1773 when it passed to his wife Mary who was heir to the house and estate. It had been acquired by her ancestor Joseph Jackson in the early 17th century. Tash was also lord of the manor of Bowes and Dernsford, which included land in Edmonton and Tottenham, and was one of those who received land following the enclosure of Enfield Chase in 1777. At the time of inclosure in 1804, Tash owned 582 acres around Broomfield House and near Southgate and Tottenham, making him the second largest landowner in Edmonton.

Tash was one of the trustees of the Weld Chapel at Southgate and played a significant role in the argument about the disposal of the living of the chapel that took place in 1813.

== Death and legacy ==
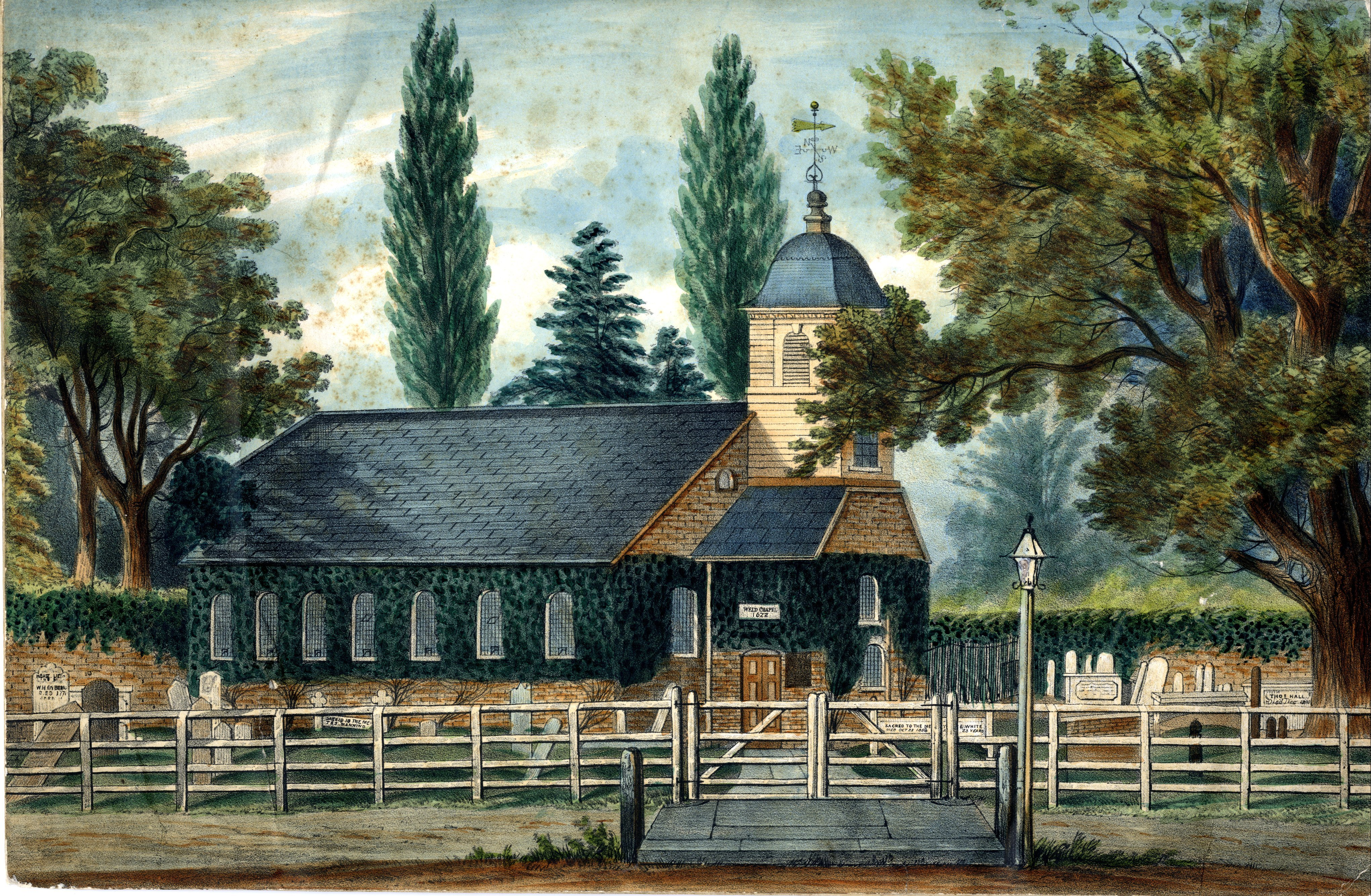
Illustration of the Weld Chapel, Southgate, of which Tash was a trustee and which formerly contained the monument to him and his wife.

Tash died on 17 July 1816 at the age of 70. His will is held at the British National Archives. A monument to the memory of William and Mary Tash was erected in the Weld Chapel at Southgate and later transferred to Christ Church, Southgate, along with the other monuments in the chapel, when the Weld Chapel was demolished. Broomfield House was sold to the Powys family.

== See also ==
- Sir John Tash
