= Rosa Lee (artist) =

Rosa Lee (1957–2009) was a Hong Kong-born British painter, teacher and writer. She was known for her layered and textured paintings created using oil and wax and constructed using lace-like stencils and spray through paper doilies. “Lee’s paintings demand a shifting of critical categories towards a re-evaluation of the ‘merely’ decorative in painting.”

She was selected for the John Moores Painting Prize in 1989, winning one of 10 awards given as part of the exhibition. Her work is held in collections including The New Hall Art Collection at the University of Cambridge, Victoria Gallery and Museum at the University of Liverpool and the Maclaurin Art Gallery at Rozelle House, Scotland.

Her writing was published in academic and arts press, and included articles on feminism and painting, the work of Bridget Riley, and the working processes of painting and teaching.

Lee studied art history at Sussex University, and painting at Saint Martin's and the Royal College of Art. She was born in Hong Kong and died in London.

== Exhibitions ==
=== Solo exhibitions ===
- Rosa Lee: Ellipsis, Winchester Gallery, Winchester, 1989
- Rosa Lee, Todd Gallery, London, 1990
- Rosa Lee: Paintings, Eagle House, Mitcham, 2012

=== Group exhibitions ===
- (Dis)parities, Mappin Art Gallery, Sheffield, 1992
- Warped: Painting and the Feminine, Angel Row Gallery Nottingham, 2001 (and touring)
- Simply Painting, Inverness Museum and Art Gallery, Scotland, 2015
