= Sir John Tash =

Sir John Tash (c. 1673 – 12 October 1735) was a leading wine merchant in London in the early eighteenth century. He was alderman for the ward of Walbrook in the City of London and a sheriff of London in 1720.

== Early life ==
John Tash was born around 1673. Among his children was his second son Thomas Tash (1730-1794) by his second wife Elizabeth who built Vale Mascall, a house in Ruxley Hundred, Kent. Thomas was governor of the English Copper Company and one of the King's commissioners of customs. He died in 1770.

== Career ==
Tash was a successful wine merchant who owned the Castle Tavern, on the south-western corner of Shoe Lane in London. He was described by T. C. Noble in Memorials of Temple Bar (1869) as the "most considerable wine merchant of his day" with "a quarter a million of money".

He was an alderman for the ward of Walbrook Ward in the City of London and a sheriff of London in 1720.

== Death and legacy ==
Tash died on 12 October 1735, age 62, and was buried and remembered with various members of his family in a plaque at the church of All-Hallows the Great.
