= Clattern Bridge =

Bridge in London, England

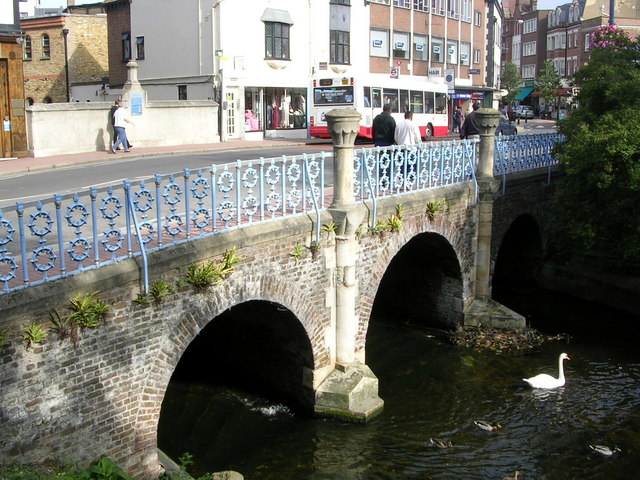
- Coordinates: 51.4086°N 0.3068°W
- Carries: High Street
- Crosses: Hogsmill River
- Locale: Kingston upon Thames
- Heritage status: scheduled ancient monument, Grade I listed

Characteristics
- Design: arch
- Material: Stone
- Piers in water: 2

Location
- Interactive map of Clattern Bridge

The Clattern Bridge is a bridge over the Hogsmill River in Kingston upon Thames. It was built around 1175 and is thus one of the oldest intact bridges in England. It replaced an older Saxon bridge which was known as the Clatrung Bridge. Its various names, such as the Clateryngbrugge, are thought to derive from the clattering of horses' hooves as they crossed the bridge. The bridge still carries a full load of modern vehicle traffic.

Up to the 18th century, the bridge was used as a site for the ducking of scolds with a cucking stool. The bridge also featured in the traditional game of football held in the centre of Kingston each year on Shrove Tuesday. It was the goal for one of the teams, while the nearby Kingston Bridge was the other goal.

== Construction ==
The bridge was constructed around 1175, during the Norman era, replacing an earlier Saxon bridge. The lower portion consists of three arches made of properly dressed ashlar stones with a filling of flint rubble. In 1758, the local authority, which was then the Kingston Court of Assembly, agreed to widen the bridge. The addition was made of red brick which was bonded into the existing stone arches. Brick parapets were built and these were capped with stone. In 1852, the bridge was widened again with the addition of a more brick-built structure. An ornamental railing was added at this time. This structure is considered quite sound and continues to bear a full load of traffic. It was scheduled as an ancient monument on 16 February 1938 and its structure is now Grade I listed.

In 2012, a zoological survey found that eels were having difficulty migrating upstream under the bridge, because of the fast flow of water across the smooth surface under the bridge. Tiles were fixed to the river bed with protrusions so that the eels could wriggle up them to pass the bridge and eels are now found upstream on the Hogsmill.

== Traditions ==
The annual game of Shrove Tuesday football in front of the town hall, as shown in the Illustrated London News in 1846. The Clattern Bridge was a goal off to the left of the picture.

Scolds were ducked at the bridge, using a cucking stool. Kingston was still doing this as late as 1745 when the landlady of the Queen's Head was ducked before a large crowd.

A traditional game of football was held each year for centuries in Kingston. Men of the town would meet at the Druid's Head on Shrove Tuesday and then the two teams – the Townsend and the Thames-Street – would compete to get the ball to one of the two goals: the great bridge over the Thames or the Clattern Bridge. William Biden tells that this started with an 8th-century dispute between rivals Kenulf and Kynard. In the late 18th century, the authorities tried to suppress the game on account of its violence and disruption of the town's trade. The Riot Act was read in 1798 and the cavalry at Hampton Court was sent for but did not respond as they were playing football too. The game was finally displaced from the public highway in 1867, when the authorities managed to move the game to a local playing field.
