= Grade I and II* listed buildings in the London Borough of Hammersmith and Fulham =

There are over 9,000 Grade I listed buildings and 20,000 Grade II* listed buildings in England. This page is a list of these buildings in the London Borough of Hammersmith and Fulham.

== Grade I ==
Name	Location	Type	Completed (Note: The date given is the date used by Historic England as significant for the initial building or that of an important part in the structure's description.)	Date designated	Grid ref. (Note: Sometimes known as OSGB36, the grid reference is based on the British national grid reference system used by the Ordnance Survey.) Geo-coordinates	Entry number (Note: The "List Entry Number" is a unique number assigned to each listed building and scheduled monument by Historic England.)	Image
Fulham Palace	Hammersmith and Fulham	Bishops Palace	c. 1480	7 May 1954	TQ2400576117; 51°28′14″N 0°12′58″W	1286903	Fulham Palace More images

== Grade II* ==
Name	Location	Type	Completed	Date designated	Grid ref. Geo-coordinates	Entry number	Image
Church of Holy Trinity, Brook Green W6	Hammersmith and Fulham	Roman Catholic Church	1851	14 February 1985	TQ2388378812; 51°29′41″N 0°13′01″W	1079845	Church of Holy Trinity, Brook Green W6 More images
Church of St John the Evangelist, Glenthorne Road W6	Hammersmith and Fulham	Former church	1857-9	17 June 1954	TQ2297578790; 51°29′41″N 0°13′48″W	1286817	Church of St John the Evangelist, Glenthorne Road W6 More images
Church of St Paul, Queen Caroline Street, Hammersmith W6	Hammersmith, Hammersmith and Fulham	Church	1882–91	17 June 1954	TQ2330078444; 51°29′29″N 0°13′31″W	1079802	Church of St Paul, Queen Caroline Street, Hammersmith W6 More images
St Peter's Church, Hammersmith, Black Lion Lane W6	Hammersmith and Fulham	Church	1827	17 June 1954	TQ2215578399; 51°29′29″N 0°14′31″W	1079843	St Peter's Church, Hammersmith, Black Lion Lane W6 More images
Church of St Thomas of Canterbury, Rylston Road SW6	Hammersmith and Fulham	Church	1847-9	12 May 1970	TQ2467477386; 51°28′54″N 0°12′21″W	1358590	Church of St Thomas of Canterbury, Rylston Road SW6 More images
Church of the Holy Innocents, Paddenswick Road W6	Hammersmith and Fulham	Church	1890–98	17 June 1954	TQ2260179070; 51°29′50″N 0°14′07″W	1192523	Church of the Holy Innocents, Paddenswick Road W6 More images
Convent and School of the Sacred Heart, 212 Hammersmith Road W6	Hammersmith and Fulham	House	1899–1900	17 June 1954	TQ2343578678; 51°29′37″N 0°13′24″W	1192062	Convent and School of the Sacred Heart, 212 Hammersmith Road W6 More images
Cremorne Bridge, West London Extension Railway Bridge	Hammersmith and Fulham	Railway Bridge	1863	26 November 2008	TQ2650776503; 51°28′24″N 0°10′48″W	1393006	Cremorne Bridge, West London Extension Railway Bridge More images
Hammersmith Odeon, former cinema, now concert venue	Hammersmith and Fulham	Cinema	1932	26 March 1990	TQ2336678361; 51°29′27″N 0°13′28″W	1252993	Hammersmith Odeon, former cinema, now concert venue More images
Fulham Town Hall (original Building and 1904-5 Extension)	Fulham Road, Fulham SW6	Town Hall	Built 1888–1890	31 July 1981	TQ2545877187; 51°28′47″N 0°11′41″W	1191939	Fulham Town Hall (original Building and 1904-5 Extension) More images
Gatehouse at HM Prison Wormwood Scrubs	Hammersmith and Fulham	Gatehouse	1885	6 March 2009	TQ2220281165; 51°30′58″N 0°14′25″W	1393182	Gatehouse at HM Prison Wormwood Scrubs More images
Chapel at HM Prison Wormwood Scrubs	Hammersmith and Fulham	Chapel	1894–1899	6 March 2009	TQ2219581220; 51°31′00″N 0°14′25″W	1393205	Chapel at HM Prison Wormwood Scrubs More images
Greenside Primary School, Westville Road W12	Hammersmith and Fulham	Elementary School	1950	30 March 1993	TQ2243979754; 51°30′12″N 0°14′14″W	1253036	Greenside Primary School, Westville Road W12 More images
Hammersmith Bridge	Hammersmith and Fulham	Suspension Bridge	1884–1886	12 May 1970	TQ2300578145; 51°29′20″N 0°13′47″W	1079819	Hammersmith Bridge More images
Hurlingham House	Hammersmith and Fulham	House	1760	7 May 1954	TQ2505975670; 51°27′58″N 0°12′04″W	1192658	Hurlingham House More images
Kelmscott House, 26 Upper Mall	Hammersmith and Fulham	House	c. 1785	17 June 1954	TQ2260078325; 51°29′26″N 0°14′08″W	1193040	Kelmscott House, 26 Upper Mall More images
Parish Church of All Saints, Putney Bridge Approach SW6	Fulham, Hammersmith and Fulham	Parish Church	14th century to early 15th century	7 May 1954	TQ2430375919; 51°28′07″N 0°12′43″W	1286566	Parish Church of All Saints, Putney Bridge Approach SW6 More images
Royal Masonic Hospital, with Associated Boundary Walls, Gates, Railings and Planters, Ravenscourt Park W6	Hammersmith and Fulham	Gate	1933	10 October 1980	TQ2217478945; 51°29′47″N 0°14′29″W	1192740	Royal Masonic Hospital, with Associated Boundary Walls, Gates, Railings and Planters, Ravenscourt Park W6 More images
Sandford Manor House, Kings Road SW6	Hammersmith and Fulham	Manor House	Later 17th century	7 May 1954	TQ2602177094; 51°28′44″N 0°11′12″W	1286723	Sandford Manor House, Kings Road SW6 More images
Sir William Powell's Almshouses, Including Gate Piers, Railings and Gates to West, 1–12 Church Gate SW6	Hammersmith and Fulham	Almshouse	1869	12 May 1970	TQ2431775994; 51°28′09″N 0°12′42″W	1079809	Sir William Powell's Almshouses, Including Gate Piers, Railings and Gates to West, 1–12 Church Gate SW6 More images
Sussex House including Boundary Wall to North	12-14 Upper Mall, Hammersmith W6	House	c. 1726	14 February 1985	TQ2264478355; 51°29′27″N 0°14′05″W	1079781	Sussex House including Boundary Wall to North More images
22 and 22A, Avonmore Road W14	Hammersmith and Fulham	Studio House	1888-9	22 March 1983	TQ2458678850; 51°29′42″N 0°12′24″W	1079838	22 and 22A, Avonmore Road W14
7 Hammersmith Terrace	Hammersmith and Fulham	Terraced House	c1760-70	17 June 1954	TQ2212178230; 51°29′23″N 0°14′33″W	1079821	7 Hammersmith Terrace More images
13 and 15, Upper Mall W6	Hammersmith and Fulham	House	Early 18th century	14 February 1985	TQ2266278331; 51°29′26″N 0°14′05″W	1079782	13 and 15, Upper Mall W6 More images
Campbell Family Mausoleum	St Mary's Catholic Cemetery, Harrow Road, Kensal Green	Mausoleum	1904	14 February 1985	TQ2260282661; 51°31′46″N 0°14′02″W	1079822	Upload Photo
