= Gerard Lanscroon =

Flemish baroque artist

Gerard Lanscroon was a Flemish baroque artist who worked in England. His father was the sculptor Valentin Lanscroon, who worked as a carver at Chatsworth House in 1695–96. Gerard completed work at Drayton House in Northamptonshire, and murals at Arnos Grove house, Southgate, London and on the staircase at Broomfield House in Palmers Green, London. The murals at Broomfield House were damaged by fires in 1984 and 1994.
