= Grade I and II* listed buildings in the London Borough of Merton =

There are over 9,000 Grade I listed buildings and 20,000 Grade II* listed buildings in England. This page is a list of these buildings in the London Borough of Merton.

== Grade I ==
Name	Location	Type	Completed (Note: The date given is the date used by Historic England as significant for the initial building or that of an important part in the structure's description.)	Date designated	Grid ref. (Note: The grid reference is based on the British national grid reference system, sometimes known as OSGB36, used by the Ordnance Survey.) Geo-coordinates	Entry number (Note: The "List Entry Number" is a unique number assigned to each listed building and scheduled monument by Historic England.)	Image
Church of St Lawrence	Morden	Church	1636 and Earlier	7 May 1954	TQ2503867443; 51°23′32″N 0°12′15″W	1080899	Church of St Lawrence More images
Eagle House	Mitcham	House	1705	7 May 1954	TQ2778369243; 51°24′28″N 0°09′51″W	1358013	Eagle House More images
Eagle House Forecourt walls, piers, railings and gates	Mitcham	Gate	1705	16 January 1954	TQ2778669244; 51°24′28″N 0°09′51″W	1193413	Eagle House Forecourt walls, piers, railings and gates More images

== Grade II* ==
Name	Location	Type	Completed	Date designated	Grid ref. Geo-coordinates	Entry number	Image
22 Parkside	Wimbledon	House	1968–1970	22 February 2013	TQ2370571239; 51°25′36″N 0°13′19″W	1409979	22 Parkside More images
Church of St Mary	Merton Park	Church	Early 13th century	7 May 1954	TQ2511269434; 51°24′36″N 0°12′09″W	1080946	Church of St Mary More images
Church of the Sacred Heart	Wimbledon	Church	1887–1901	28 May 1987	TQ2391670250; 51°25′04″N 0°13′10″W	1080957	Church of the Sacred Heart More images
Eagle House	Wimbledon	House	1613	1 June 1949	TQ2387971169; 51°25′34″N 0°13′11″W	1193286	Eagle House More images
Morden Park, including Walls and Pair of Circular Garden Buildings Attached to North West	Morden	House	1770	2 September 1988	TQ2484567557; 51°23′36″N 0°12′25″W	1080902	Morden Park, including Walls and Pair of Circular Garden Buildings Attached to North West More images
Church of St Mary	Wimbledon	Church	Late Medieval	1 June 1949	TQ2450271458; 51°25′42″N 0°12′38″W	1080917	Church of St Mary More images
Church of St Peter and St Paul	Mitcham	Church	1819–22	16 January 1954	TQ2704768689; 51°24′11″N 0°10′30″W	1080948	Church of St Peter and St Paul More images
Southside House	Merton Park	House	Earlier	7 May 1954	TQ2338370594; 51°25′15″N 0°13′37″W	1194026	Southside House More images
The Canons	Mitcham	House	Later alteration	7 May 1954	TQ2786568345; 51°23′59″N 0°09′48″W	1358036	The Canons More images
The Old Rectory House	Merton Park	House	c. 1500	1 June 1949	TQ2447271534; 51°25′45″N 0°12′39″W	1080951	Upload Photo
The Old Windmill	Wimbledon	House	1860s	1 June 1949	TQ2301172444; 51°26′16″N 0°13′54″W	1358050	The Old Windmill More images
