= Old House & Essex Coach House =

Buildings in Southgate, London, England

Coordinates: 51°37′30″N 0°07′32″W

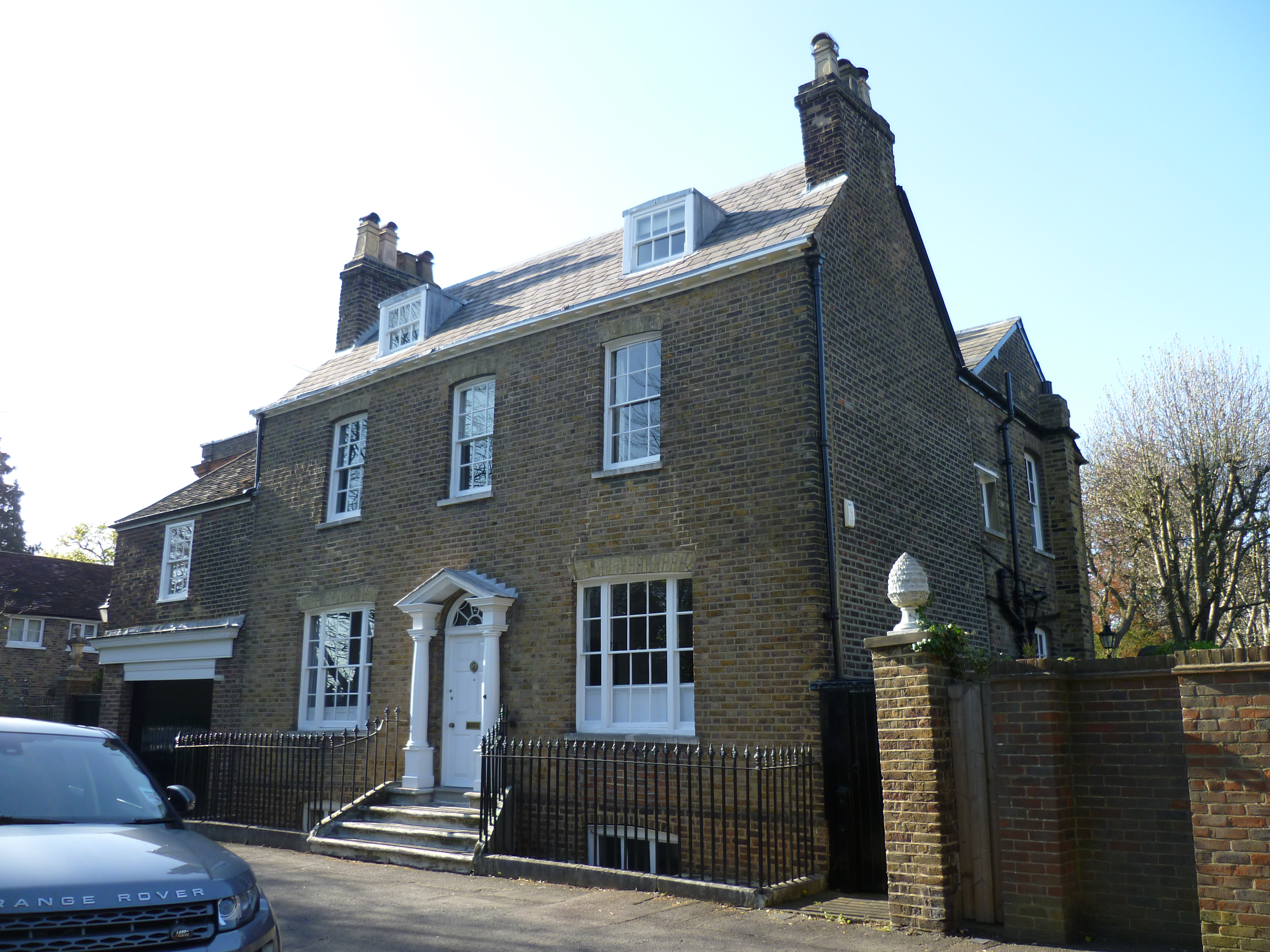
Old House with Essex Coach House on the left.

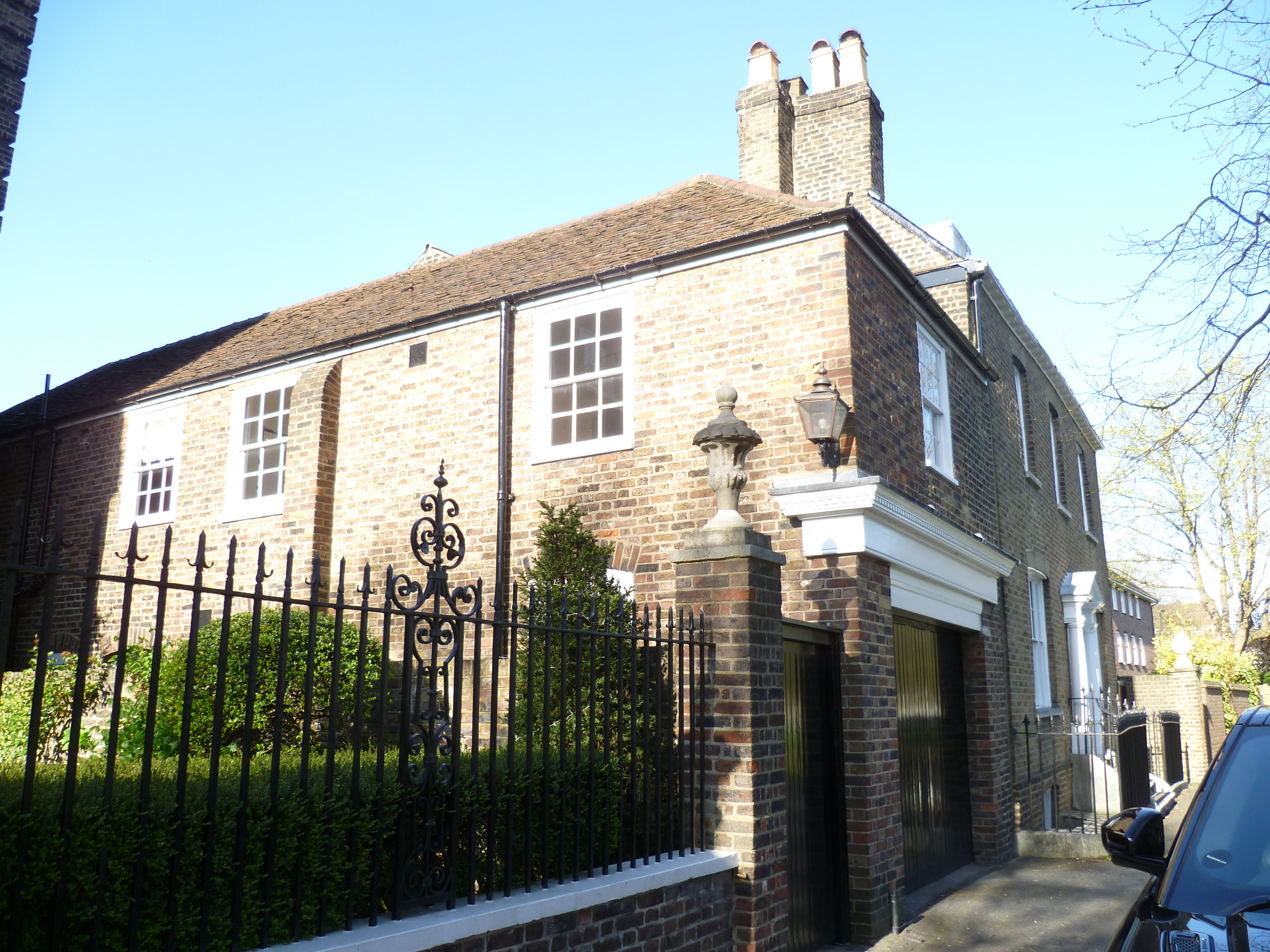
Essex Coach House

Old House and Essex Coach House are adjoining grade II listed buildings on The Green, Southgate, London.

== See also ==
- Arnoside House and Essex House
