= Holy Trinity, Brook Green =

Coordinates: 51.494687°N 0.216857°W

Holy Trinity Church
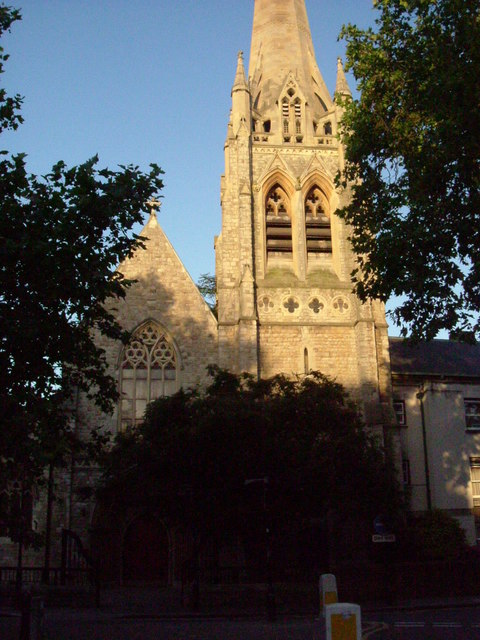
- Holy Trinity Church
- Location: 41 Brook Green, Hammersmith, London W6
- Country: England
- Denomination: Roman Catholic
- Website: www.holytrinityw6.org

History
- Status: Parish church
- Dedication: Holy Trinity

Architecture
- Functional status: Active
- Heritage designation: Grade II*
- Designated: 14 February 1985
- Architect(s): William Wardell, with spire by Joseph Hansom
- Style: Gothic Revival
- Years built: 1851–53, 1867 or 1871
- Groundbreaking: 1851 by Cardinal Wiseman
- Completed: 1853
- Construction cost: £20,000

Administration
- Archdiocese: Westminster
- Parish: ragstone

Clergy
- Priest: Fr Richard Andrew

Holy Trinity Roman Catholic Church is a Roman Catholic church in Hammersmith, London W6. Its building is Grade II* listed

== History and architecture ==
Cardinal Wiseman donated the land on which to build the church, and on 6 May 1851 he laid the foundation stone. It is built of Kentish ragstone and cost about £20,000 to complete. Helen, Countess Tasker, a benefactor of several Roman Catholic church and school projects, gave £4,000. The church was opened on 26 July 1853.

The architect was William Wardell, who designed the church in a Gothic Revival rendition of Decorated Gothic. It has north and south side aisles and the nave is lit by a clerestory. The nave and chancel have arch-braced roofs. The building has stained glass windows by John Hardman.

From the beginning, Holy Trinity served a growing Catholic community in the area, initially boosted by the Irish mass migrations to Great Britain.

In 1862 a school for girls and infants was built behind the church to designs by Joseph John Scoles. In 1894 the children were transferred to the nearby Sacred Heart School and the former school building became the parish rooms.

The church has a southwest tower, with a spire that was added later. Sources disagree as to whether the spire was added in 1867 or 1871. Most sources agree that it was designed by Joseph Hansom, although Nikolaus Pevsner originally attributed it to his brother Charles Francis Hansom.

The present presbytery was completed in 1964.

== Holy Trinity today ==
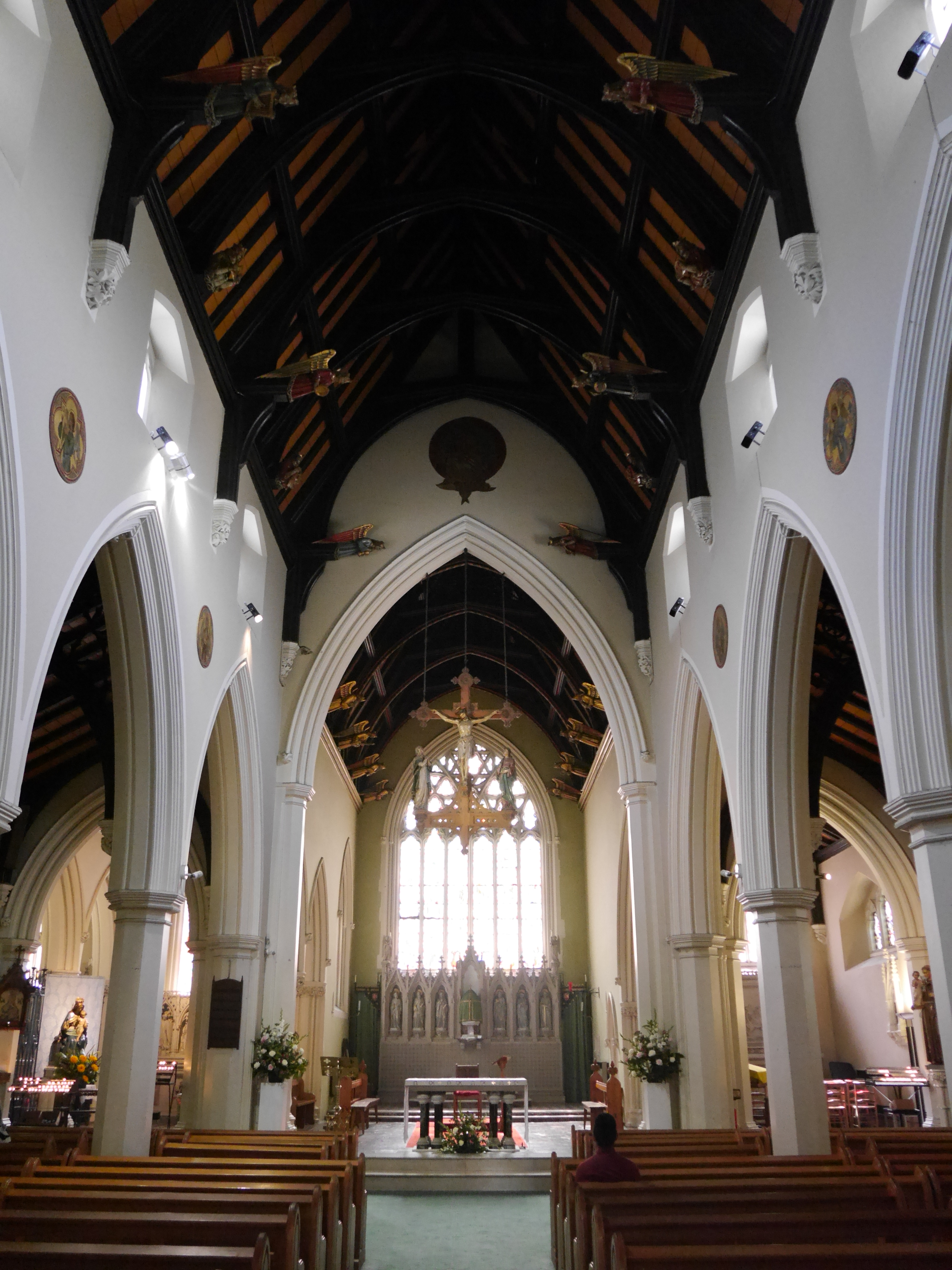
Inside the church, looking east to the chancel

Today Holy Trinity serves an ethnically diverse parish as the demographics of the parish change. There is a sizable French-speaking population because the church is near the Lycée Français Charles de Gaulle in nearby South Kensington. It is also used by the Syriac Catholic Church, who hold Mass here in Arabic and Aramaic on Sunday afternoons.

== See also ==
- History of Shepherd's Bush
- St Simon's Church, Shepherd's Bush
