= Broomfield House =

Listed building in Broomfield Park, Palmers Green, Enfield, London

Coordinates: 51.6176°N 0.1172°W

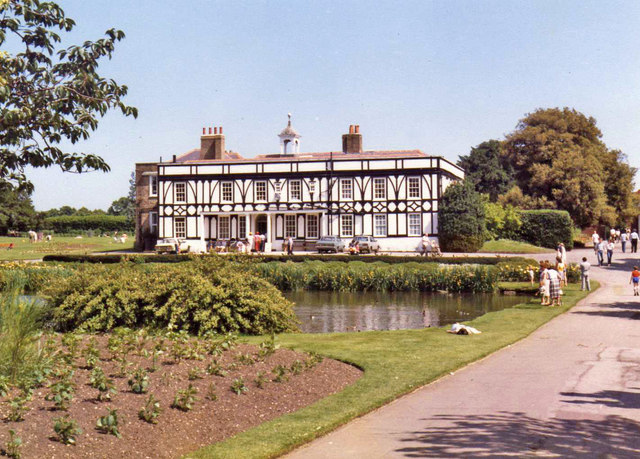
Broomfield House in 1981, before the fires

Broomfield House is a listed building of historical interest located in Broomfield Park, Palmers Green, Enfield, London. Built during the 16th century, it was damaged by fires in 1984, 1993, 1994 and 2019. Various programmes of restoration have been proposed for the building – none have made progress as of January 2024.

== History ==
Broomfield House was sold to London merchant Joseph Jackson in 1624 after several previous occupants. During the 150 years that the Jackson family were in possession of the house, the house was internally remodelled to a considerable extent. The grand staircase was built and murals were painted by Gerard Lanscroon, and the surrounding Broomfield Park was created. In 1773 the house was acquired by William Tash on his marriage to Mary Jackson who was heir to the house and estate.

During the late 18th century to early 19th century the once U-shaped building was altered into a rectangular shape, enclosing the once east-facing courtyard. After a period where the house was let to tenants, the house and 54 acres (220,000 m^{2}) of land were sold for development to Southgate Urban District Council, who opened the park to the public in 1903.

Between 1907 and 1910 the building housed Southgate County School, with Southgate's first maternity centre opening there in 1917. The building was classified as Grade II* in 1950 because of its history and architectural uniqueness.

== Fires ==
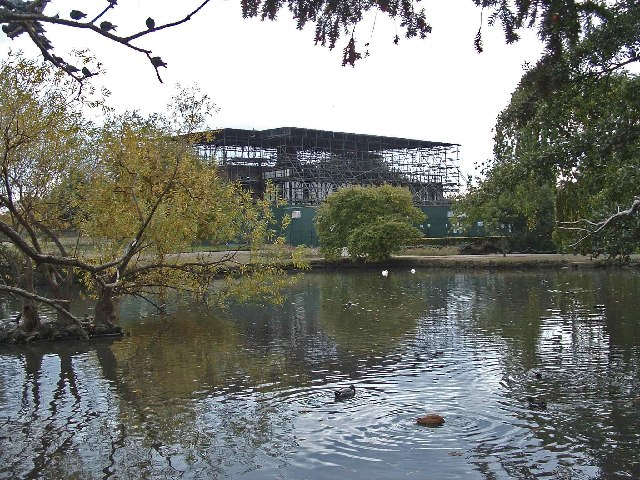
Broomfield House covered in scaffolding after the fire in 1984

In 1984 a fire broke out in the building which damaged the roof and the top floor. The cause was deemed to be electrical. A temporary roof was erected to ensure further damage was kept to a minimum, though a permanent roof was not rebuilt as the house was no longer in use. Further fires in 1993-1994 made the building in its current state unusable and unsafe. Though Enfield Borough Council wanted to demolish the building, heritage groups persuaded the council to obtain a report looking into the possibility of restoration. The report concluded that restoration should be undertaken, and the building was made safe.

On Tuesday 9 April 2019 early morning park visitors called the Fire Brigade to a large fire at the house; further extensive damage was sustained. The building remains enclosed by scaffolding until details of the full restoration and its future use by the community can be agreed upon.

== Restoration proposals ==
In 2003 Broomfield House was featured on the BBC television series Restoration as a nominee for the south-east segment of the show, alongside Wilton's Music Hall in London and Darnley Mausoleum in Kent; Broomfield House lost out to Wilton's Music Hall.

On 25 November 2009 a new proposal was initiated, when the Mayor of London's office made up to £500,000 available for preparatory and public consultation work to make the house into sheltered housing accommodation. Concerns were raised by some local people about the proposals which the Enfield Council was to address as part of its public consultation. An unknown proportion of the £500,000 was used to create extensive evaluations of environmental issues, planning ideas and future strategies. However, further funding was later withdrawn and the project was abandoned.
