= T. C. Noble =

Antiquarian

Theophilus Charles Noble (1840 – 1 March 1890) was an English antiquarian and non-fiction author.

== Selected publications ==
- The Lord Mayor of London. 1860.
- Memorials of Temple Bar; with some account of Fleet Street, and the Parishes of St. Dunstan and St. Bride, London. &c. Diprose & Bateman, London, 1869.
- A Ramble Round the Crystal Palace. 1875.
- A Brief Account of the Westminster Tobacco-box. 1879.
- A Caxton Memorial. 1880.
- A Brief Memorial of W. F. Bray. 1880.
- Biographical Notices of Thomas Wood, D.D., Bishop of Lichfield. 1882.
- An Historical Essay on the Rise and Fall of the Spanish Armada, 1588. 1886.
- A Brief History of the Worshipful Company of Ironmongers, London A.D. 1351–1889. 1889.
