= Sussex House =

Building in Hammersmith, London, England

Coordinates: 51.490850°N 0.234855°W

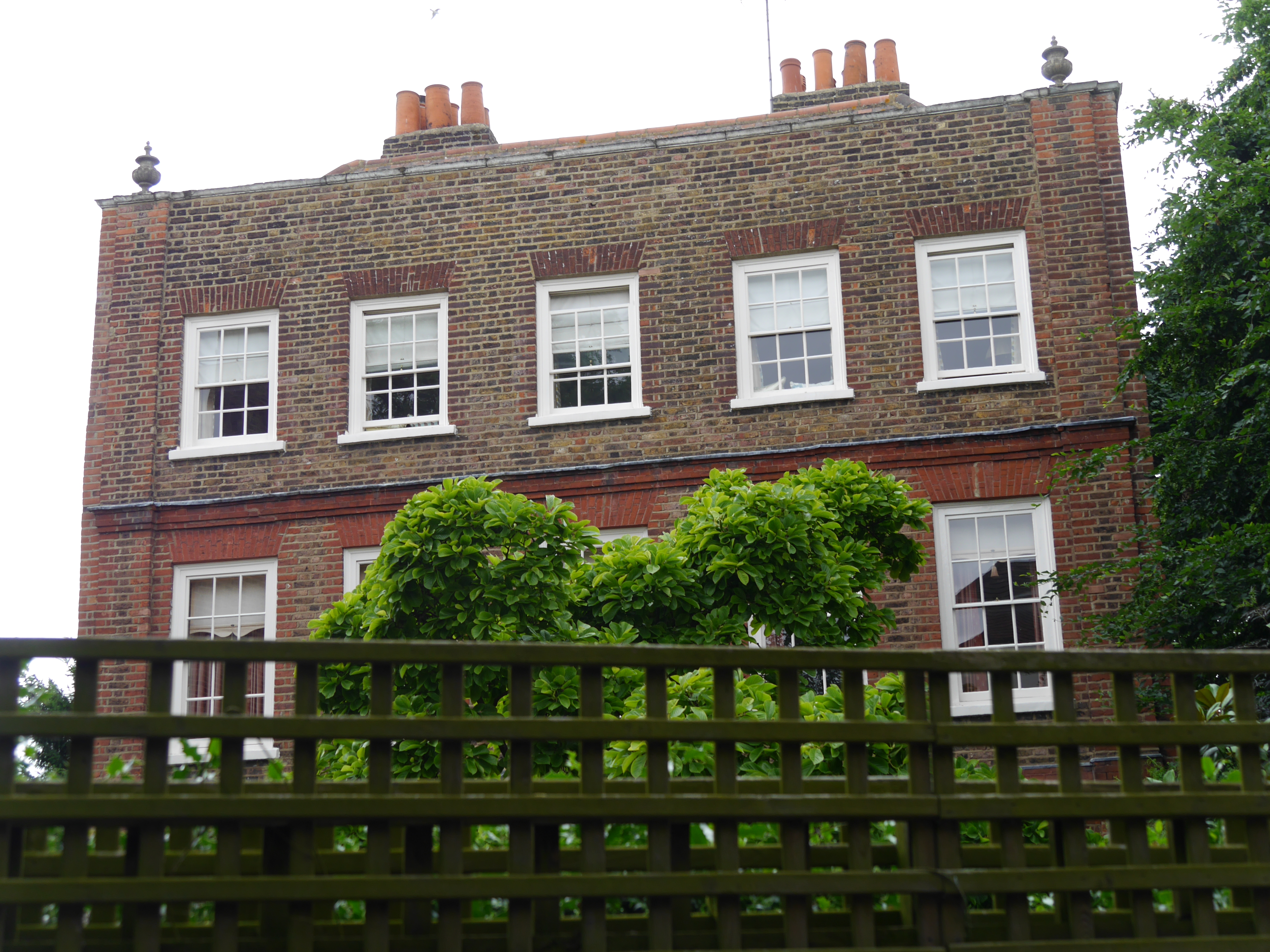
Sussex House

Sussex House is a Grade II* listed house at 12–14 Upper Mall, Hammersmith, London W6 9TA.

It is just south of the Great West Road, and was built in about 1726.

This building is listed under the Planning (Listed Buildings and Conservation Areas) Act 1990 as amended for its special architectural or historic interest, since 1985.

The house features an old brick boundary wall on the north and east sides.
