= St John the Evangelist, Palmers Green =

Church in the London Borough of Enfield, England

Coordinates: 51.6237°N 0.1048°W

St John the Evangelist
- St John the Evangelist, Palmers Green
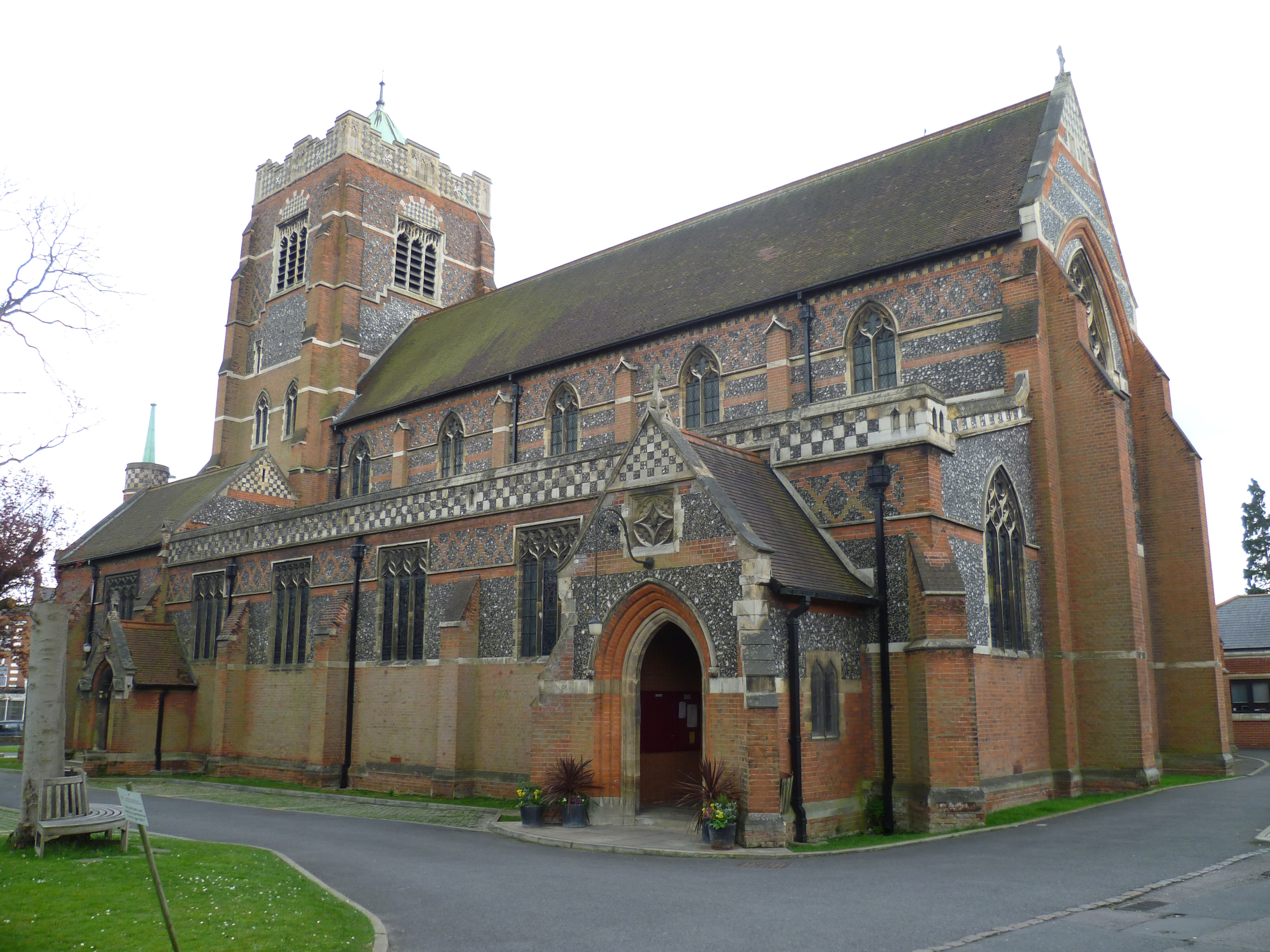
- St John the Evangelist
- Location: Palmers Green, London Borough of Enfield, North London.

History
- Founded: 1903–1909

Architecture
- Architect: John Oldrid Scott
- Architectural type: Parish church

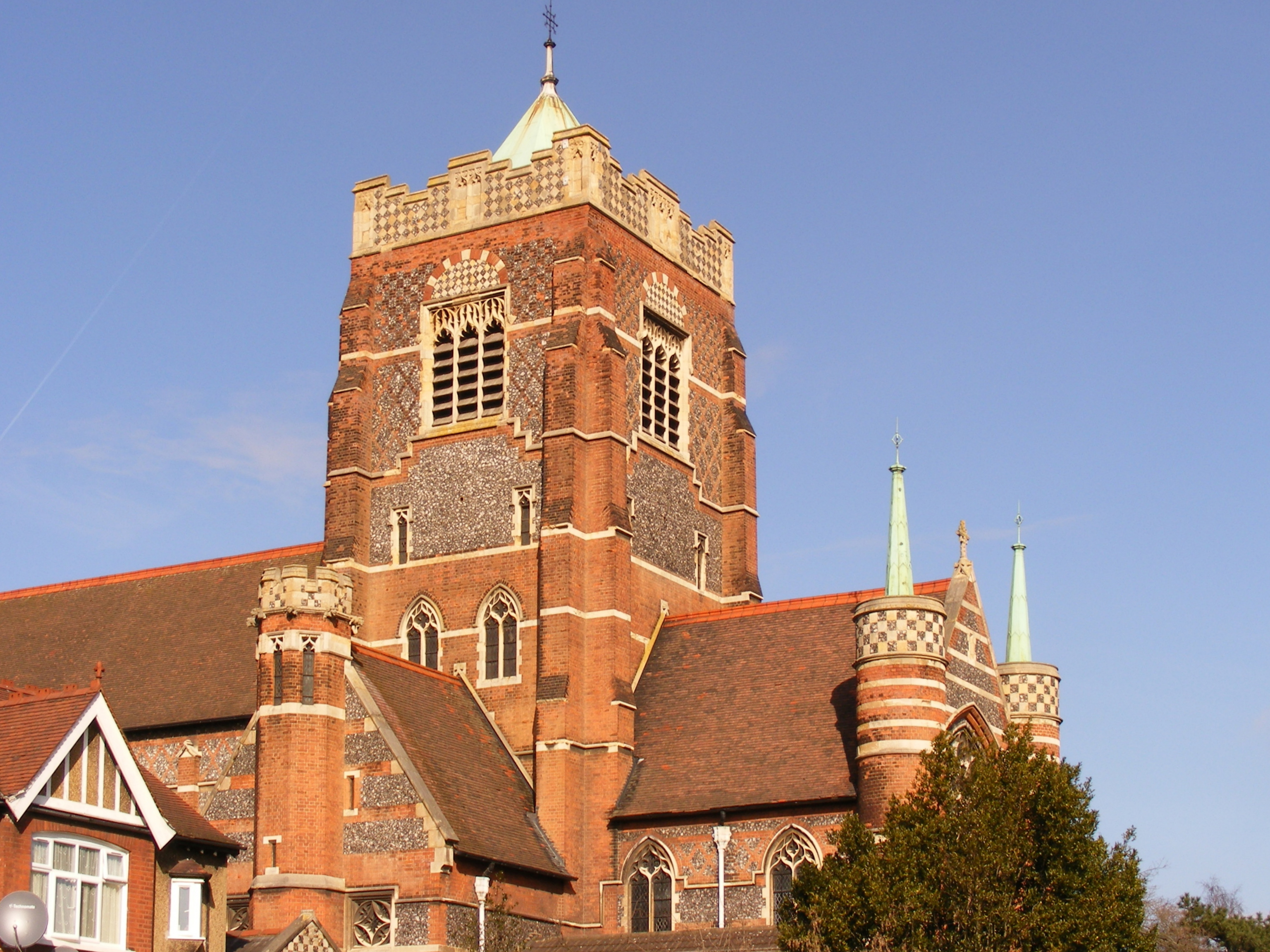
St John Palmers Green.JPG

St John the Evangelist, Palmers Green is the Church of England parish church of Palmers Green, London Borough of Enfield, North London. It was designed by John Oldrid Scott (brother of George Gilbert Scott Junior) in 1903–9.

== History ==
The church was built in what was then part of the parish of Southgate. The site was given by Vyell E. Walker of Arnos Grove, who also donated £1,000 towards the cost of building and left a further £500 in his will. Walker's sister, Anna Maria Baird, who had married a former vicar of Southgate, donated £5,000 on condition that the chancel and tower should be built first.

The foundation stone was laid on 17 October 1903 and the east end was consecrated on 12 November 1904 by the Bishop of London. St John's was made a parish on 12 January 1906, and the completed church was consecrated on 5 April 1908.
