= Arnoside House and Essex House =

Houses in Southgate, London, England

Coordinates: 51°37′30″N 0°07′33″W

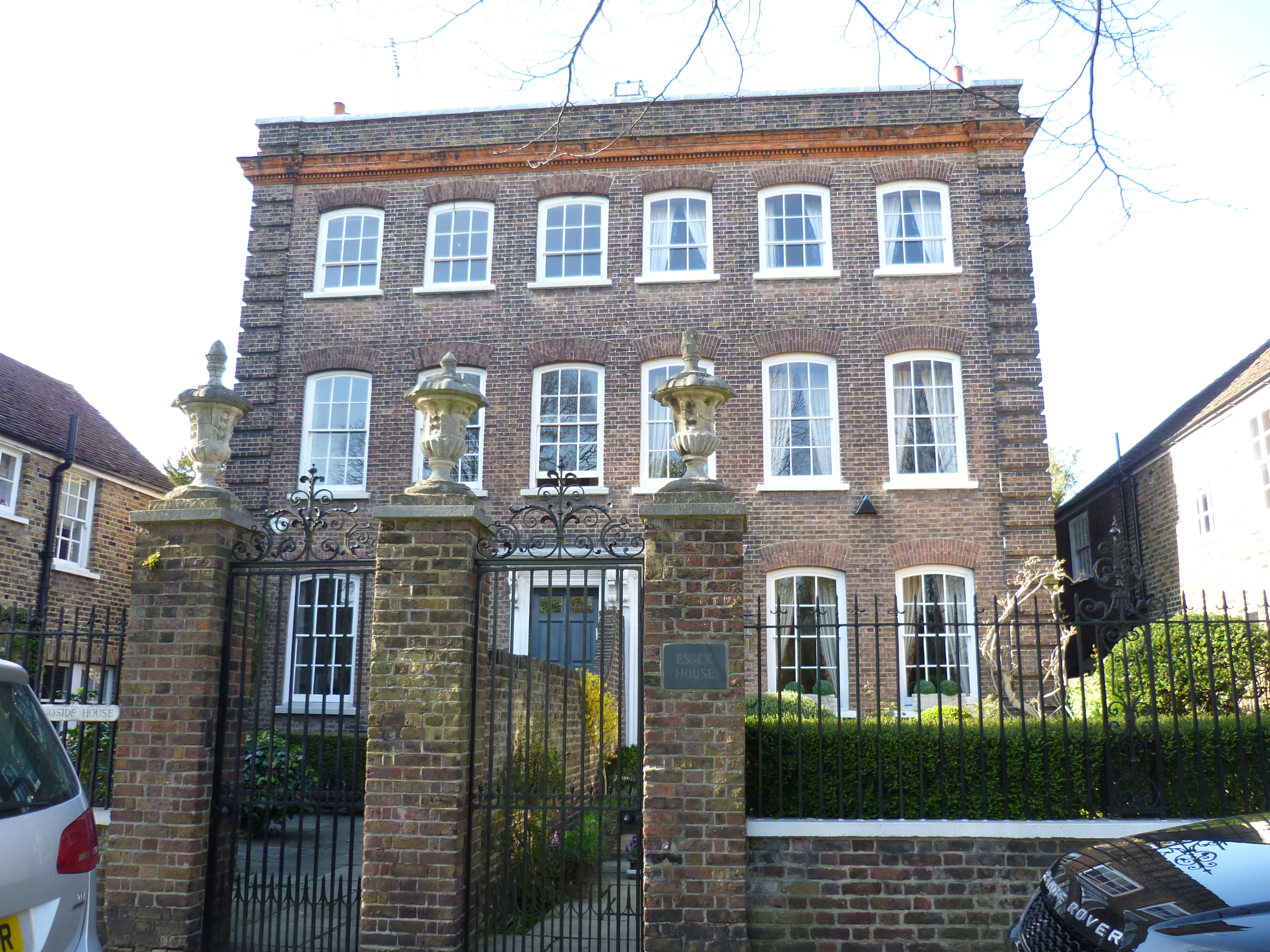
Arnoside House and Essex House

Arnoside House and Essex House are adjoining grade II* listed buildings on The Green, Southgate, London.

The walls and railings at the front of the houses are also grade II* listed, while Arnoside Cottage to the west is grade II listed.

== See also ==
- Old House & Essex Coach House
