= Market House, Kingston =

Market building in Kingston upon Thames

Market House
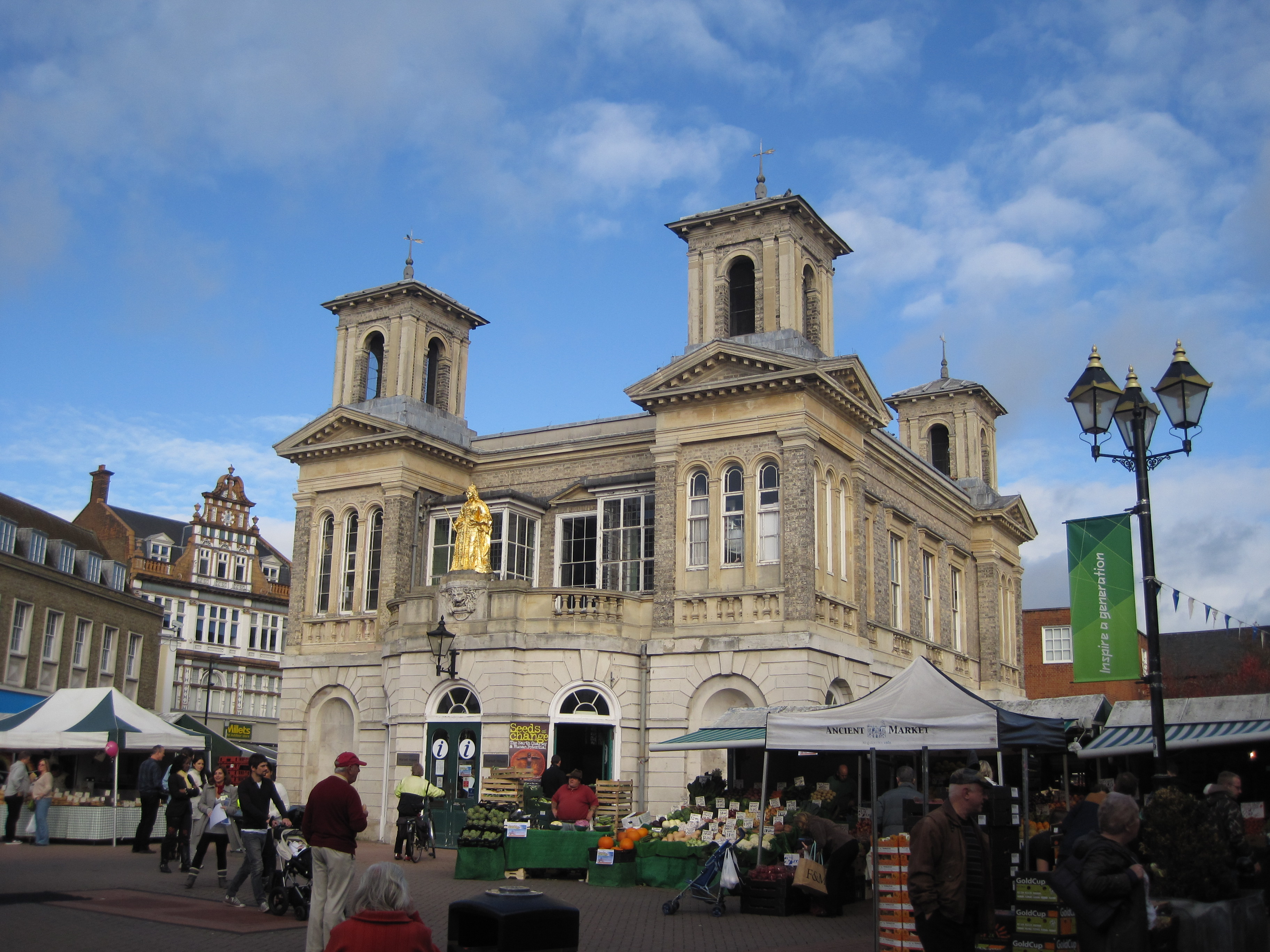
- Interactive map of the Market House area

General information
- Architectural style: Italianate architecture
- Location: Kingston Upon Thames, London, England
- Coordinates: 51.4098°N 0.3062°W
- Year built: 1838-1840

Design and construction
- Architect: Charles Henman Senior

Listed Building – Grade II*
- Official name: Market House
- Designated: 10 June 1983
- Reference no.: 1358428

Market House is a Grade II* listed building in Kingston Market, London. It previously served as the town hall for Kingston, and the ground floor was also used for market space. Market House is also part of the Kingston Old Town conservation area.

== History ==
Since 1505 the site of Market House had held the previous town hall. The current building was built between 1838 and 1840 remained the town hall of Kingston until the Kingston Guildhall's construction in 1935. There have been a number of minor modifications to the building throughout the years. As of 2025 the building sits empty although there have been plans to reuse it as a commercial space along with as a broader scheme to revitalise the struggling Ancient Kingston Market which was founded around 1170. In 2025, Kingston council consolidated Market House with the surrounding market with a longer term lease in order to encourage a more unified approach.

== Description ==
The building's plot is roughly rectangular in shape and sits on the northern side of the triangular Market Place. It is built in an Italianate style with Portland stone and Bath stone masonry as well as brick and ironwork features. The balcony on its southern facade holds a statue of Queen Anne from 1706 that was re-gilded in 1995.
