= Broomfield Park, Palmers Green =

Park in Palmers Green, London

Coordinates: 51.61827°N 0.11761°W

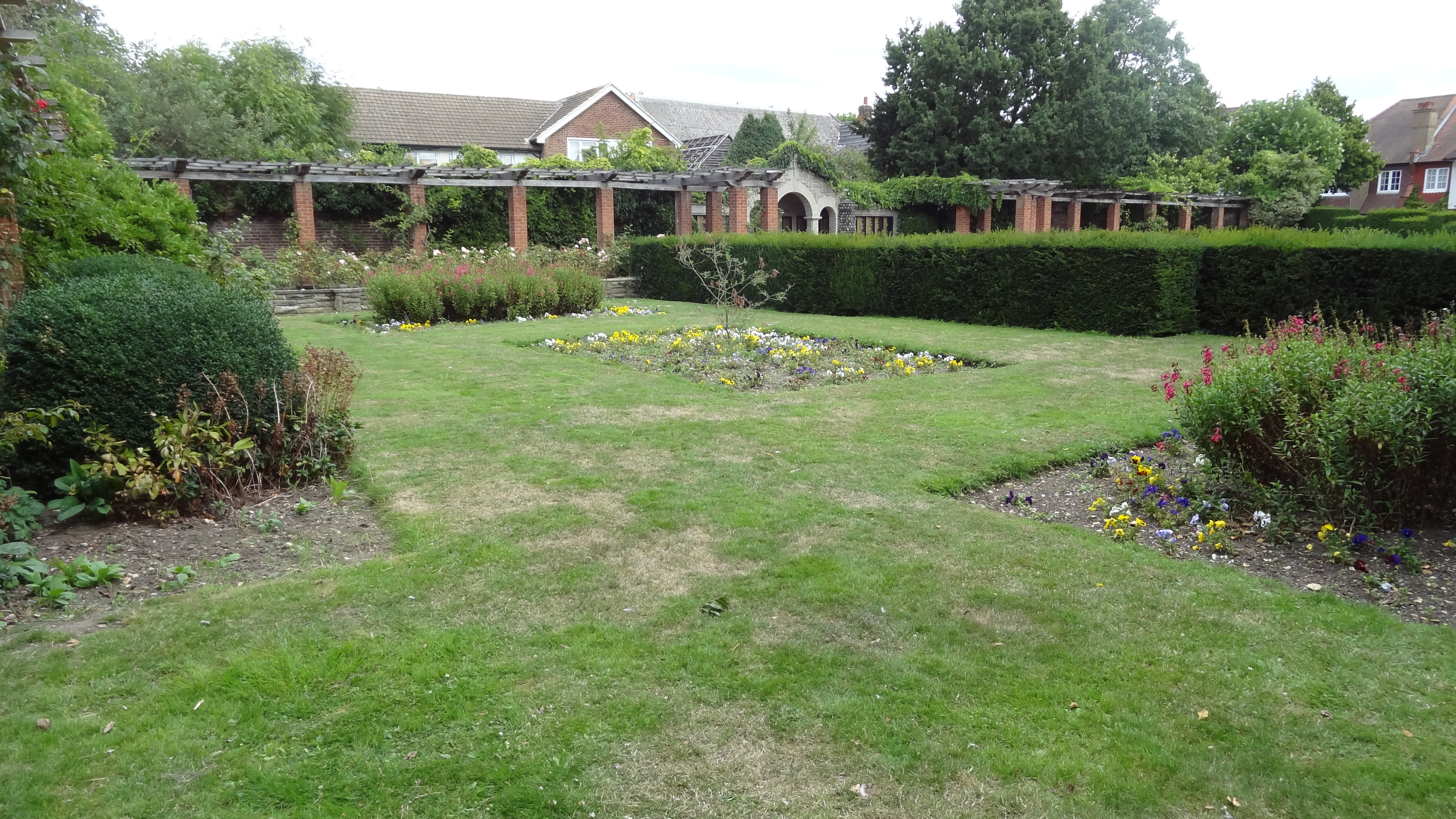
Garden in Broomfield Park

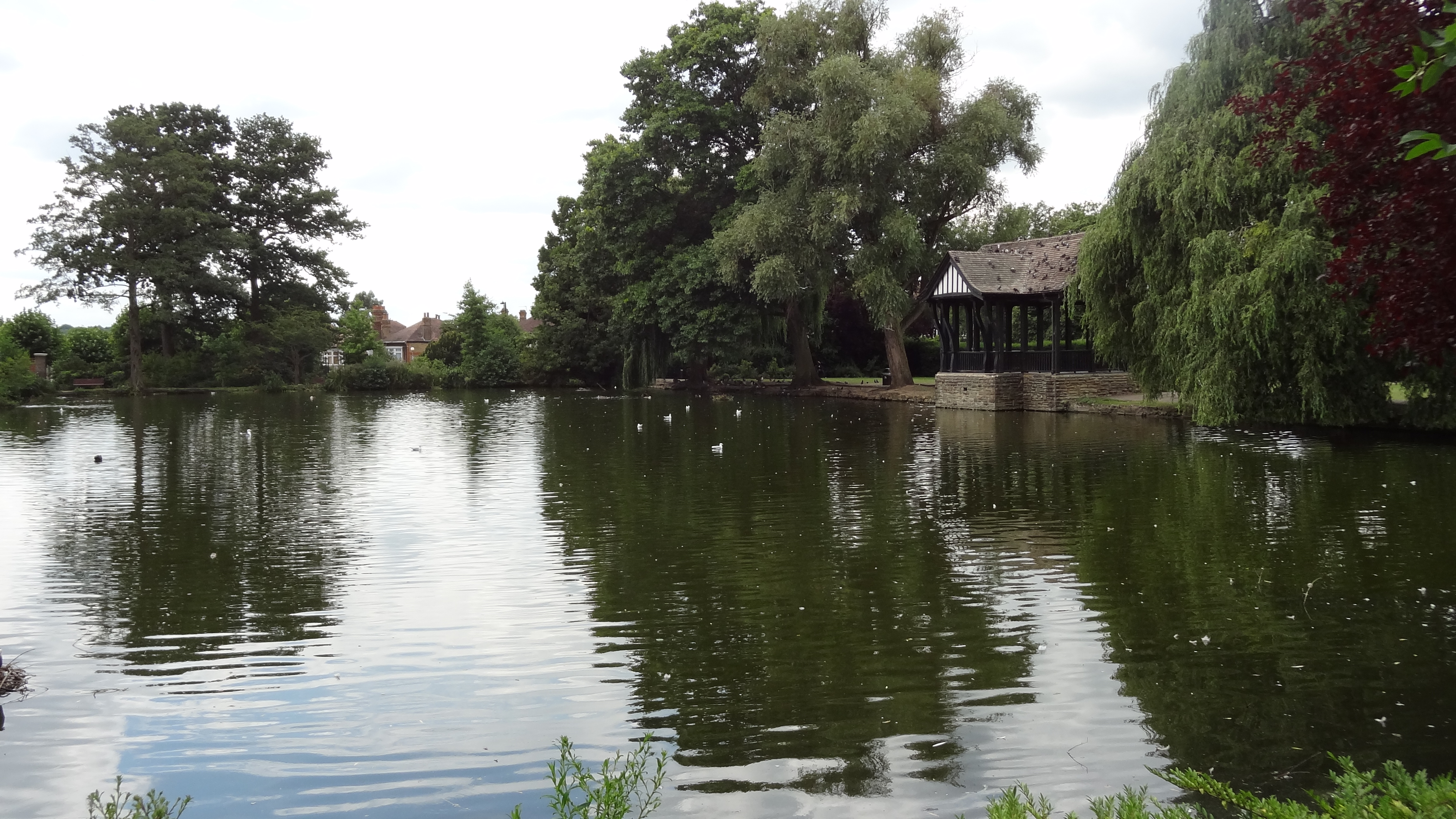
One of the Broomfield Park lakes

Broomfield Park is a 21 hectare public park in Palmers Green in the London Borough of Enfield. It is a Site of Local Importance for Nature Conservation and is registered by English Heritage in the Register of Historic Parks and Gardens for its special historic interest

== History ==
The park was the garden of Broomfield House, which was built in the sixteenth century, although the oldest part of the present house is about 200 years old. Rocque's map of Middlesex in 1754 shows the park with its current boundaries, with ponds and an avenue. Three of the four ponds date from the eighteenth century, but the northernmost one was created early in the twentieth. In 1902 Southgate Urban District Council purchased the house and grounds, and they were opened to the public in 1903. The house was gutted by fires in the 1980s and 1990s and has remained in a derelict state since then.

In August 2019, a new wetland area was opened in the park, with the aim of creating a new wildlife habitat and improving river water quality nearby.

== Facilities ==
The park has tennis, basketball and netball courts, a conservatory, a bandstand (where music events are occasionally held) a children's playground and a garden of remembrance. Two former bowling greens have been re-purposed, one for a community orchard and the other as an events space. An active group of volunteers, 'Friends of Broomfield Park', have in collaboration with Enfield Council, revived the conservatory, herbaceous borders, lakes and parkland. Volunteers are planting new trees and hedgerows.

Arthur Mee described it as "one of the most charming and varied in all the London area". The park has a variety of wildlife habitats, including the lakes, some small woods and magnificent oak trees. Aquatic plants include rigid hornwort, which is rare in London. There are also breeding birds such as Canada geese, mallard, tufted duck, coot and moorhen. There used to be a running track at the North East of the park. There is a community run cafe staffed by volunteers.

== Access ==
The park is bounded by Aldermans Hill, Powys Lane, Broomfield Lane and Broomfield Avenue, and there is access from all sides.
