= Salisbury House, Edmonton =

House in Edmonton, London, England

Coordinates: 51°38′01″N 0°04′28″W

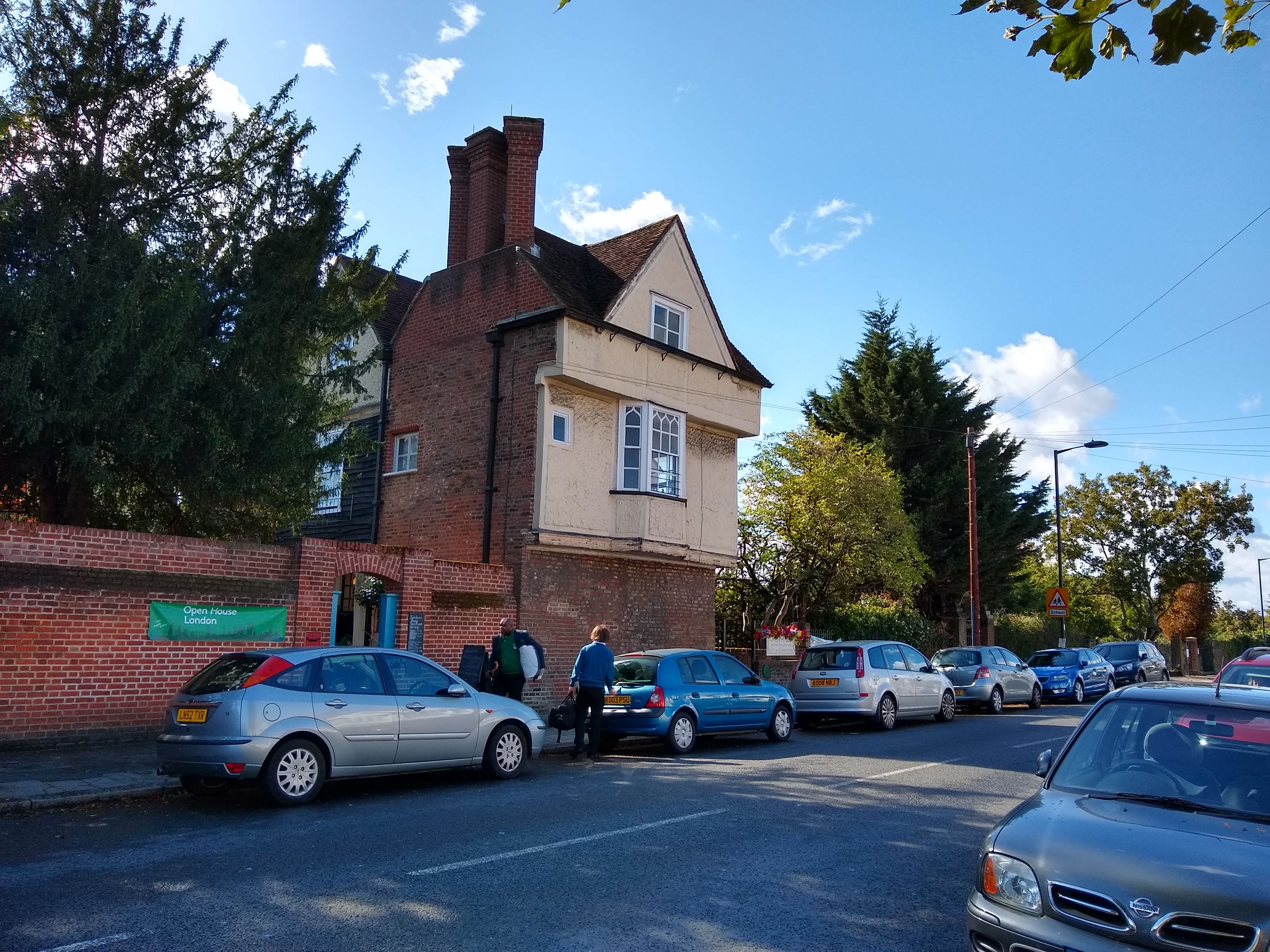
Salisbury House in Bury Street West

Salisbury House in Bury Street West, Edmonton, London, is a grade II* listed building with Historic England.

== Gallery ==
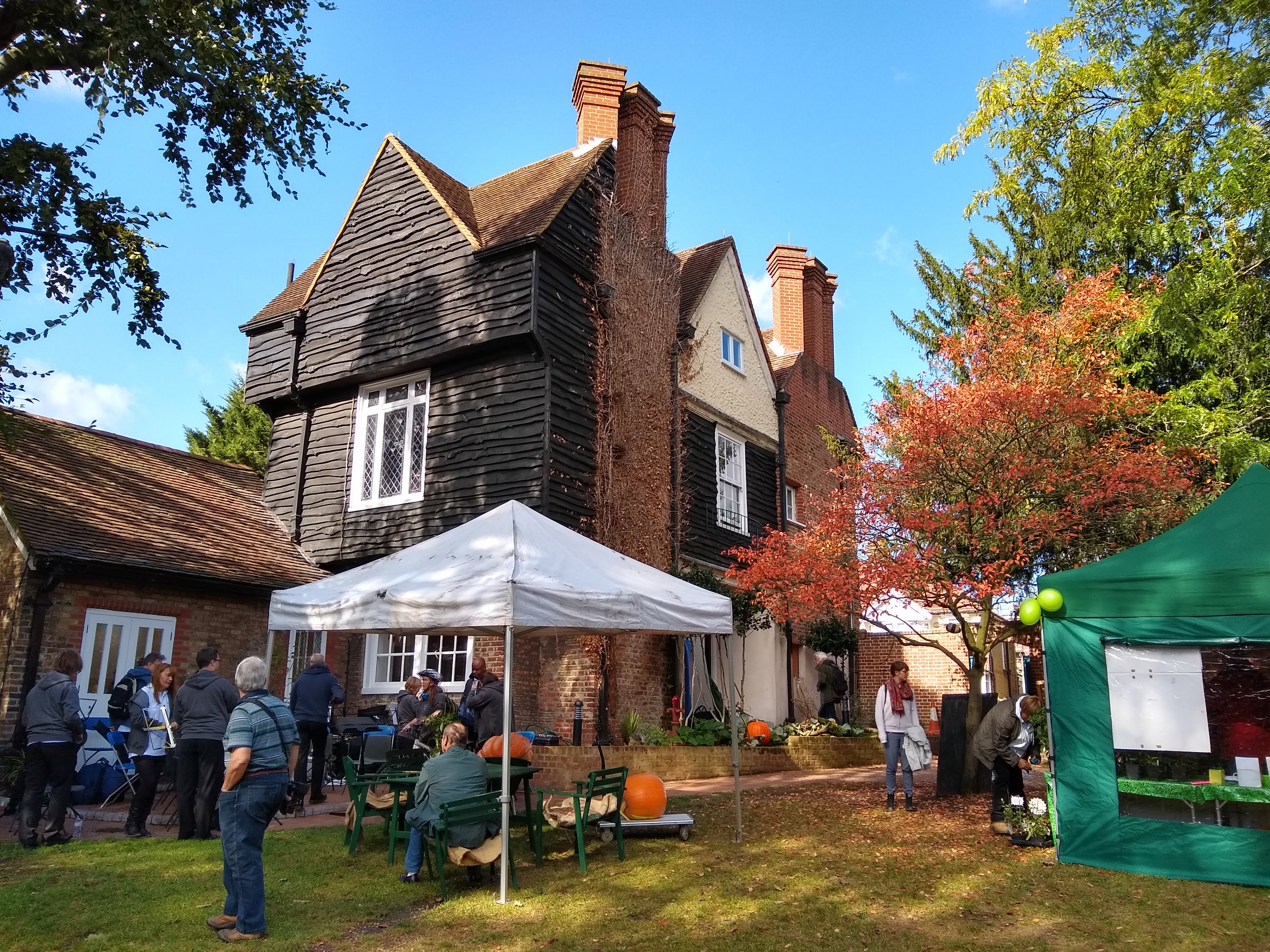
East side

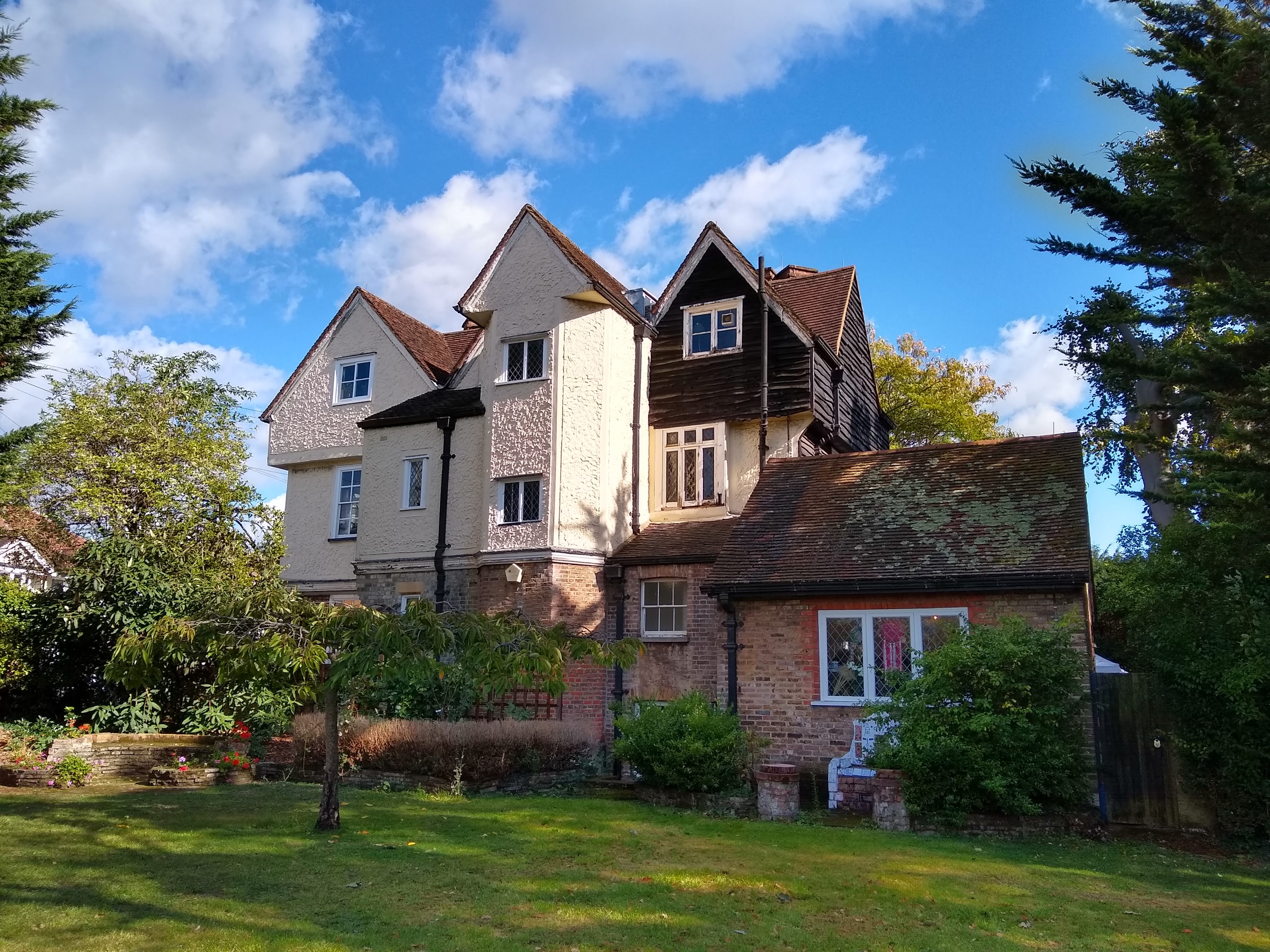
West side

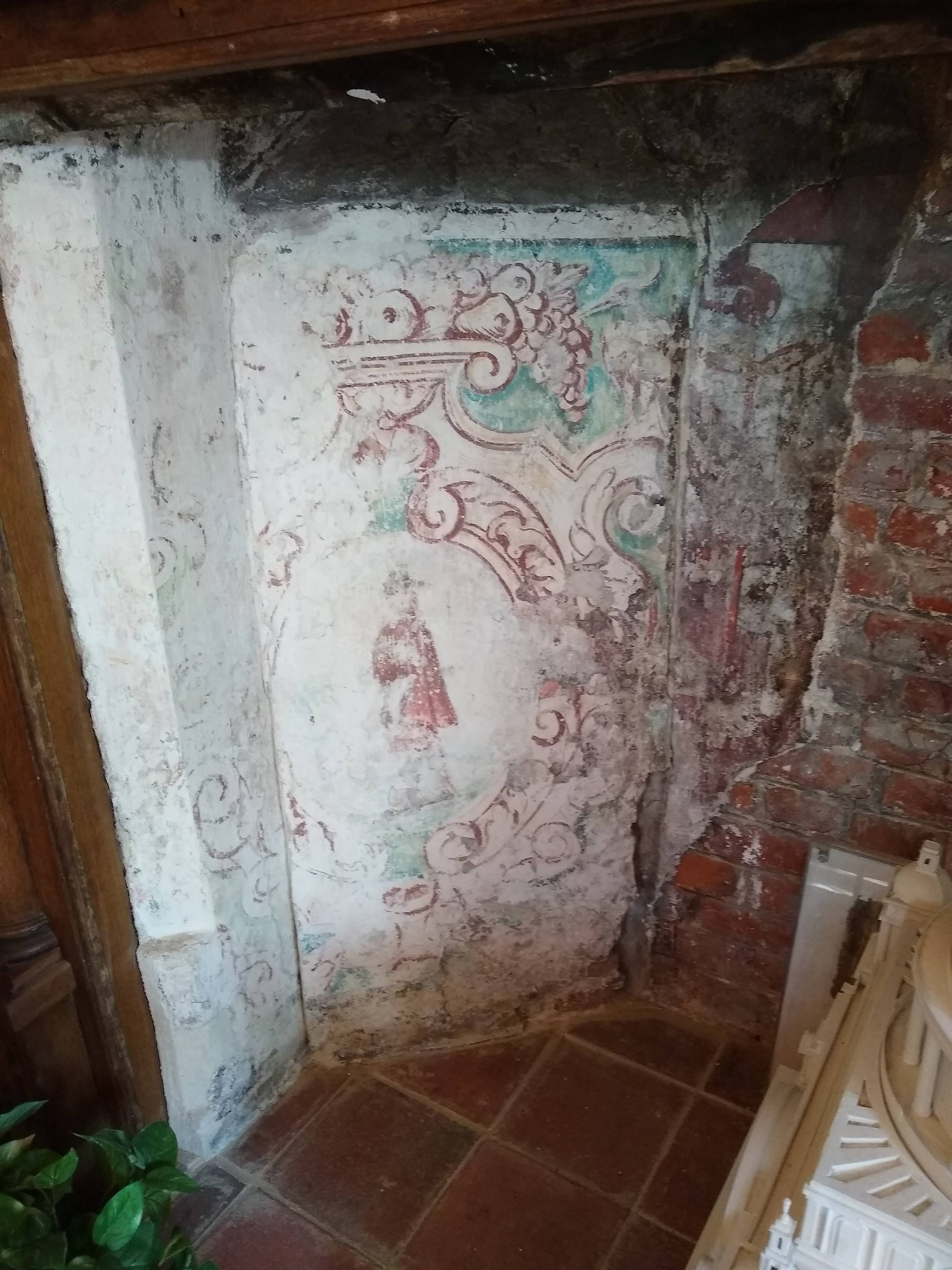
Fireplace painting

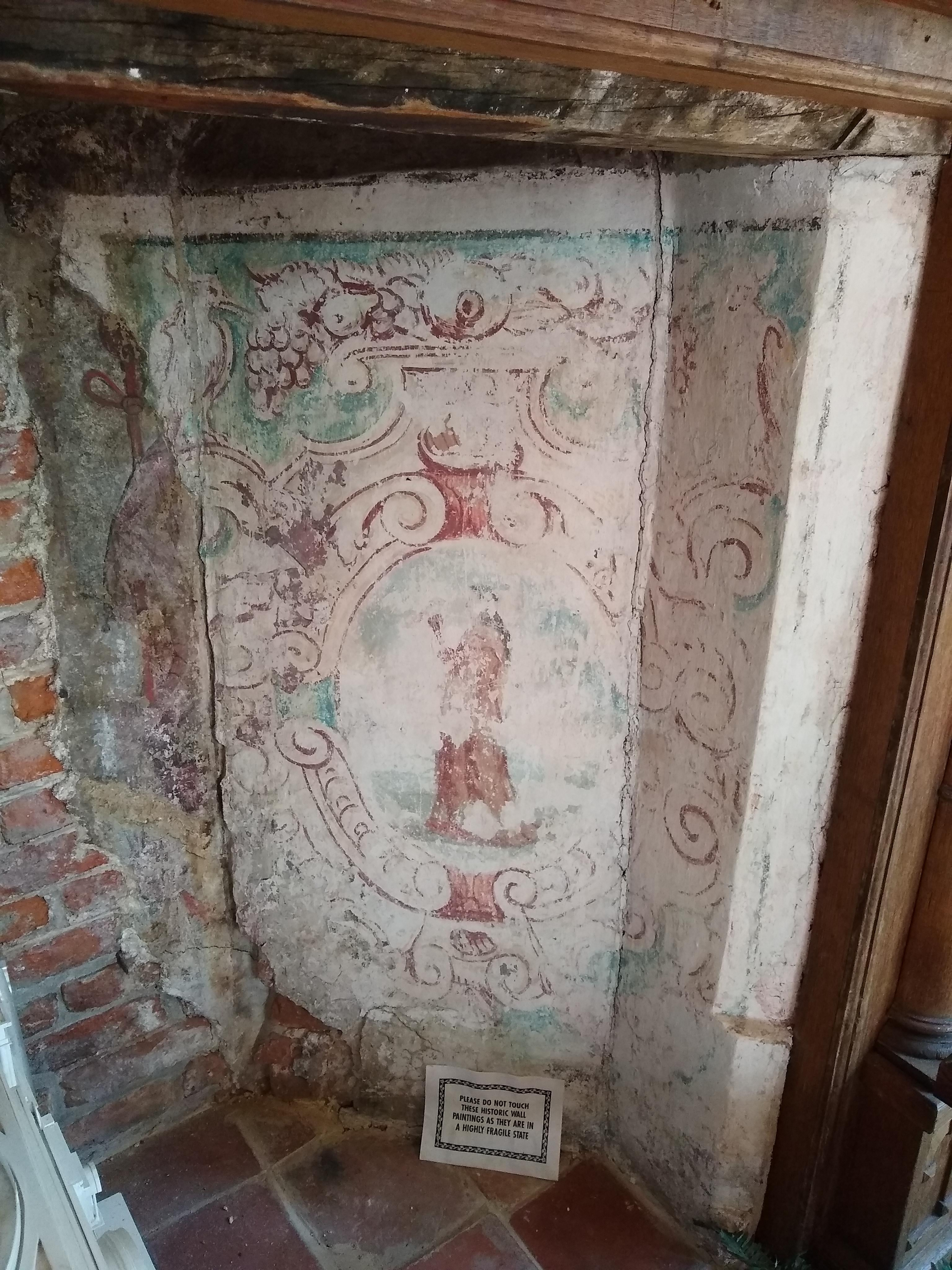
Fireplace painting

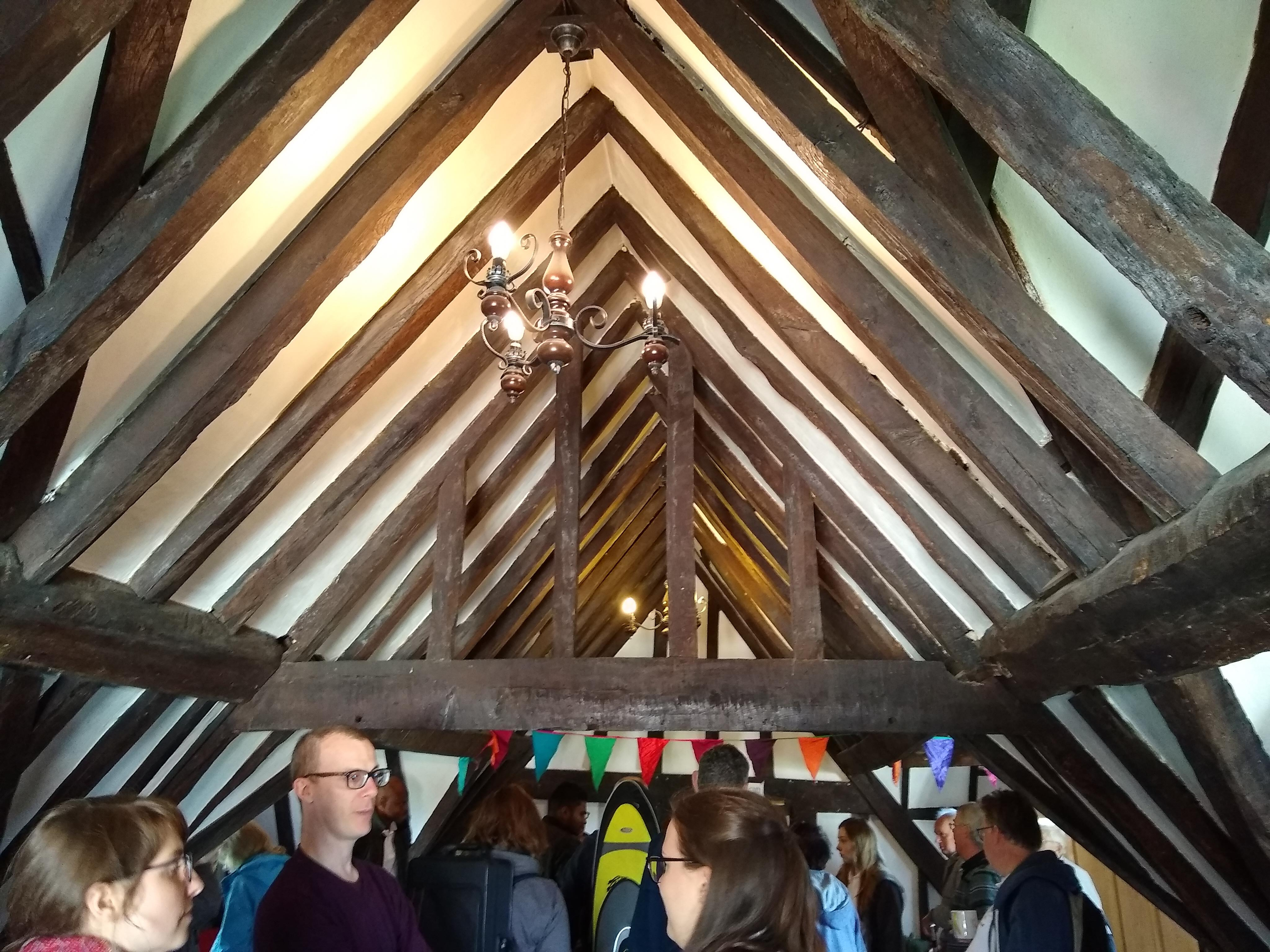
Roof beams
