= Eagle House, Mitcham =

Grade I listed house in Mitcham, London

Coordinates: 51°24′30″N 0°9′57″W

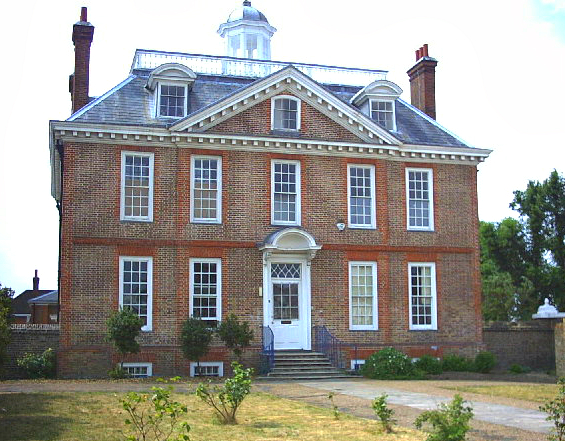
Eagle House, London Road, Mitcham

Eagle House is a Grade One Listed Queen Anne house built in the Dutch style. It is on London Road, Mitcham, in the London Borough of Merton, the grounds forming a triangle bounded by London Road, Bond Road and Western Road.

The building dates back to 1705, having been commissioned by the Marrano doctor Fernando Mendes (1647–1724), former physician to Charles II, and in whose family it remained for three generations.

Following the death in 1821 of the last private occupant—the widow of City banker John Bond—the property was converted into a private boarding school for young gentlemen.

In the early days of the Holborn Union Industrial Schools, built in the northern part of the estate, it served as the school infirmary.

In 1933, the building was bought by the Surrey County Council, for the care of 'mentally deficient girls'. Since 2005, the building has been a school for children and young people with autism.
