= Grade I and II* listed buildings in the London Borough of Ealing =

There are over 9,000 Grade I listed buildings and 20,000 Grade II* listed buildings in England. This page is a list of these buildings in the London Borough of Ealing.

== Grade I ==
Name	Location	Type	Completed (Note: The date given is the date used by Historic England as significant for the initial building or that of an important part in the structure's description.)	Date designated	Grid ref. (Note: Sometimes known as OSGB36, the grid reference is based on the British national grid reference system used by the Ordnance Survey.) Geo-coordinates	Entry number (Note: The "List Entry Number" is a unique number assigned to each listed building and scheduled monument by Historic England.)	Image
Church of St Mary	Northolt	Church	c.1300	24 February 1950	TQ1320384034; 51°32′38″N 0°22′08″W	1079414	Church of St Mary More images
Church of St Mary the Virgin	Perivale	Church	Probably 13th century	24 February 1950	TQ1642882780; 51°31′55″N 0°19′22″W	1079402	Church of St Mary the Virgin More images
Church of the Holy Cross (old church)	Ealing	Church	Late 15th or early 16th century	24 February 1950	TQ1451983155; 51°32′08″N 0°21′01″W	1294306	Church of the Holy Cross (old church) More images
Pitzhanger Manor	Ealing Green	Country house	1770	24 February 1950	TQ1757280473; 51°30′39″N 0°18′26″W	1358808	Pitzhanger Manor More images
Pitzhanger Manor Entrance archway and gates	Ealing Green	Gate	1802	19 January 1981	TQ1760080517; 51°30′41″N 0°18′24″W	1079350	Pitzhanger Manor Entrance archway and gates More images
Wharncliffe Viaduct	Hanwell	Viaduct	1836–37	8 November 1949	TQ1492280399; 51°30′39″N 0°20′43″W	1358811	Wharncliffe Viaduct More images

== Grade II* ==
Name	Location	Type	Completed	Date designated	Grid ref. Geo-coordinates	Entry number	Image
Walpole Park Bridge	Ealing Green	Bridge	1801–11	19 January 1981	TQ1749480489; 51°30′40″N 0°18′30″W	1079351	Walpole Park Bridge More images
Hoover Factory Main front block	Perivale	Electrical goods factory	1932–35	10 October 1980	TQ1667482965; 51°32′01″N 0°19′09″W	1079353	Hoover Factory Main front block More images
Hoover Factory Canteen block	Perivale	Canteen	1938	7 May 1981	TQ1661282987; 51°32′02″N 0°19′13″W	1079361	Hoover Factory Canteen block More images
Church of St Mary	Ealing	Church	1739	19 January 1981	TQ1769479743; 51°30′16″N 0°18′20″W	1079376	Church of St Mary More images
Church of St Mary	Norwood Green	Church	12th century	8 November 1949	51°29′43″N 0°22′00″W	1189501	Church of St Mary More images
Church of St Mary	Hanwell	Church	c.1841	24 February 1950	TQ1476980730; 51°30′50″N 0°20′51″W	1079453	Church of St Mary More images
Church of St Peter	Ealing	Church	1889–92	19 January 1981	TQ1773281732; 51°31′20″N 0°18′16″W	1079390	Church of St Peter More images
Church of St Thomas the Apostle	Ealing	Anglican church	1933–34	3 January 1996	TQ1599379352; 51°30′04″N 0°19′49″W	1244068	Church of St Thomas the Apostle More images
Former Norwood Free School	Norwood Green	Free school	1767	29 September 1976	TQ1354078671; 51°29′44″N 0°21′57″W	1079381	Former Norwood Free School More images
Goldsmiths' Almshouses and railings fronting road	Ealing	Gate	1811	25 January 1951	TQ2084880401; 51°30′35″N 0°15′36″W	1358762	Goldsmiths' Almshouses and railings fronting road More images
Holy Cross New Church	Ealing	Church	1939	19 January 1981	TQ1449283158; 51°32′09″N 0°21′02″W	1079417	Holy Cross New Church More images
Liberty Cinema	Ealing	Former cinema	1928	18 September 1980	TQ1277580331; 51°30′38″N 0°22′35″W	1079380	Liberty Cinema More images
No. 14 South Parade	Ealing	House	1889–91	2 February 1970	TQ2092778852; 51°29′44″N 0°15′34″W	1294239	No. 14 South Parade More images
Odeon Cinema	Ealing	Cinema	c.1932	16 January 1974	TQ1706479079; 51°29′55″N 0°18′54″W	1079396	Odeon Cinema More images
Church of Christ the Saviour	Ealing	Church	1852	24 February 1950	TQ1771780760; 51°30′49″N 0°18′18″W	1079392	Church of Christ the Saviour More images
Roman Bridge	Ealing	Bridge	Late 18th century	8 November 1949	TQ1440979024; 51°29′55″N 0°21′12″W	1079401	Roman Bridge More images
Southall Manor House	Ealing	House	c.1821	8 November 1949	TQ1247079400; 51°30′08″N 0°22′52″W	1079419	Southall Manor House More images
The Elms	Ealing	House	c.1720	25 January 1951	TQ1954580329; 51°30′33″N 0°16′44″W	1079349	The Elms More images
