= Grade I and II* listed buildings in the London Borough of Brent =

There are over 9,000 Grade I listed buildings and 20,000 Grade II* listed buildings in England. This page is a list of these buildings in the London Borough of Brent.

== Grade I ==
Name	Location	Type	Completed (Note: The date given is the date used by Historic England as significant for the initial building or that of an important part in the structure's description.)	Date designated	Grid ref. (Note: The grid reference is based on the British national grid reference system, sometimes known as OSGB36, used by the Ordnance Survey.) Geo-coordinates	Entry number (Note: The "List Entry Number" is a unique number assigned to each listed building and scheduled monument by Historic England.)	Image
Old St Andrew's Church, Kingsbury	Brent	Church	12th century	6 October 1952	TQ2063586864; 51°34′05″N 0°15′42″W	1188676	Old St Andrew's Church, Kingsbury More images

== Grade II* ==
Name	Location	Type	Completed	Date designated	Grid ref. Geo-coordinates	Entry number	Image
Church of All Souls	Harlesden	Church	1879	23 January 1974	TQ2160883276; 51°32′07″N 0°14′53″W	1359000	Church of All Souls More images
Church of St Andrew	Willesden	Church	1885	26 July 1951	TQ2271584597; 51°32′49″N 0°13′54″W	1078881	Church of St Andrew More images
Church of St Mary	Willesden	Church	13th century	26 July 1951	TQ2144684798; 51°32′56″N 0°15′00″W	1359036	Church of St Mary More images
Hundred Elms Farm Outbuilding	Sudbury	Outbuilding	Early 16th century	6 October 1952	TQ1644385882; 51°33′35″N 0°19′18″W	1078876	Hundred Elms Farm Outbuilding
Mecca Bingo	Kilburn	Cinema	1936–37	10 October 1980	TQ2504584032; 51°32′29″N 0°11′54″W	1078889	Mecca Bingo More images
New Parish Church of St Andrew	Kingsbury	Church	1844–47	6 October 1952	TQ2057086894; 51°34′05″N 0°15′42″W	1078874	New Parish Church of St Andrew More images
Sudbury Town Underground station	Sudbury	Underground station	1930–31	19 February 1971	TQ1688884888; 51°33′03″N 0°18′56″W	1294594	Sudbury Town Underground station More images
The Old Oxgate	Cricklewood	Farmhouse	16th century	26 July 1951	TQ2247386845; 51°34′02″N 0°14′04″W	1078875	The Old Oxgate
