= Grade I and II* listed buildings in the London Borough of Newham =

There are over 9,000 Grade I listed buildings and 20,000 Grade II* listed buildings in England. This page is a list of these buildings in the London Borough of Newham.

== Grade I ==
| Name | Location | Type | Completed (Note: The date given is the date used by Historic England as significant for the initial building or that of an important part in the structure's description.) | Date designated | Grid ref. (Note: Sometimes known as OSGB36, the grid reference is based on the British national grid reference system used by the Ordnance Survey.) Geo-coordinates | Entry number (Note: The "List Entry Number" is a unique number assigned to each listed building and scheduled monument by Historic England.) | Image |
|---|---|---|---|---|---|---|---|
| Church of All Saints | Newham | Church | 12th century | 25 October 1984 | TQ3941283862; 51°32′11″N 0°00′31″E | 1358002 | Church of All Saints More images |
| Church of St Mary Magdalene | Newham | Church | 12th century | 21 October 1982 | TQ4292982378; 51°31′20″N 0°03′32″E | 1080961 | Church of St Mary Magdalene More images |
| Church of St Mary the Virgin | Little Ilford, Manor Park, Newham | Church | 12th century | 17 November 1980 | TQ4289885292; 51°32′54″N 0°03′34″E | 1190948 | Church of St Mary the Virgin More images |
| Tide Mill (known as the House Mill) | Bromley by Bow, Newham | Mill | 1776 | 30 March 1955 | TQ3828582826; 51°31′39″N 0°00′29″W | 1080970 | Tide Mill (known as the House Mill) More images |

== Grade II* ==
| Name | Location | Type | Completed | Date designated | Grid ref. Geo-coordinates | Entry number | Image |
|---|---|---|---|---|---|---|---|
| Abbey Mills Pumping Stations | Newham | Sewage Pumping Station | 1868 | 6 November 1974 | TQ3871583222; 51°31′51″N 0°00′06″W | 1190476 | Abbey Mills Pumping Stations More images |
| Former St Mark's Church (Brick Lane Music Hall) | Newham | Parish Church | Built 1860–62 | 17 December 1971 | TQ4188980173; 51°30′10″N 0°02′34″E | 1080963 | Former St Mark's Church (Brick Lane Music Hall) More images |
| Gallions Hotel | Beckton, Newham | Hotel | 1881–1883 | 27 August 1998 | TQ4397280689; 51°30′24″N 0°04′23″E | 1376224 | Gallions Hotel More images |
| Newham Council Offices | Newham | Town Hall | 1901-3 | 31 January 1973 | TQ4268083544; 51°31′58″N 0°03′20″E | 1190712 | Newham Council Offices More images |
| The Theatre Royal | Newham | Theatre | 1884 | 28 June 1972 | TQ3885584527; 51°32′33″N 0°00′03″E | 1293425 | The Theatre Royal More images |
| University House, University of East London (West Ham Precinct) | Newham | Column | 1895–98 | 25 October 1984 | TQ3946184629; 51°32′36″N 0°00′35″E | 1080964 | University House, University of East London (West Ham Precinct) |
