= Druid's Head, Kingston upon Thames =

Pub in Kingston upon Thames, London

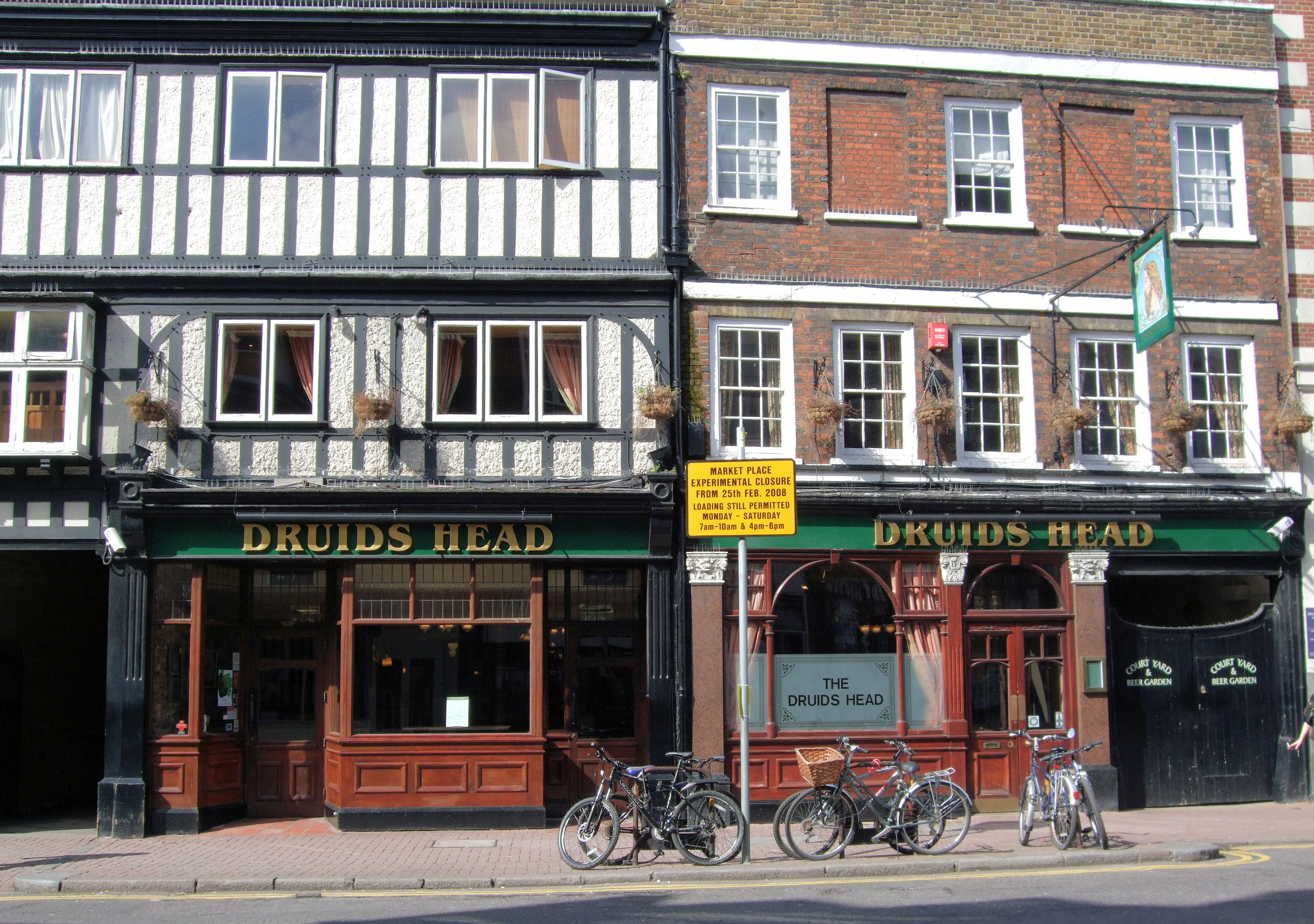
- Druid's Head

- Location within Royal Borough of Kingston upon Thames Location within Greater London

General information
- Location: 3 Market Place, Kingston upon Thames, London, KT1 1JT, England
- Coordinates: 51°24′33″N 0°18′23″W

Design and construction
- Designations

Listed Building – Grade II
- Official name: Druid's Head Public House
- Designated: 6 October 1983
- Reference no.: 1184751

The Druid's Head is a Grade II* listed public house at 3 Market Place, Kingston upon Thames, London.

Built in the 17th and early 18th centuries, it originally consisted of two pubs: The Druid and The Hog's Head. Situated side-by-side, they merged in the 1980s. Despite this, it is still the oldest surviving pub in Kingston. Originally a coaching inn, it was frequented by a number of patrons including Charles Dickens and Jerome K. Jerome. The latter left an inscription on the upstairs window. A 1983 study noted the building's attractive early 18th century brick front, as well as the original staircase and plaster ceilings on the first floor.
