= Eagle House, Wimbledon =

Historic house in Wimbledon, London

Eagle House
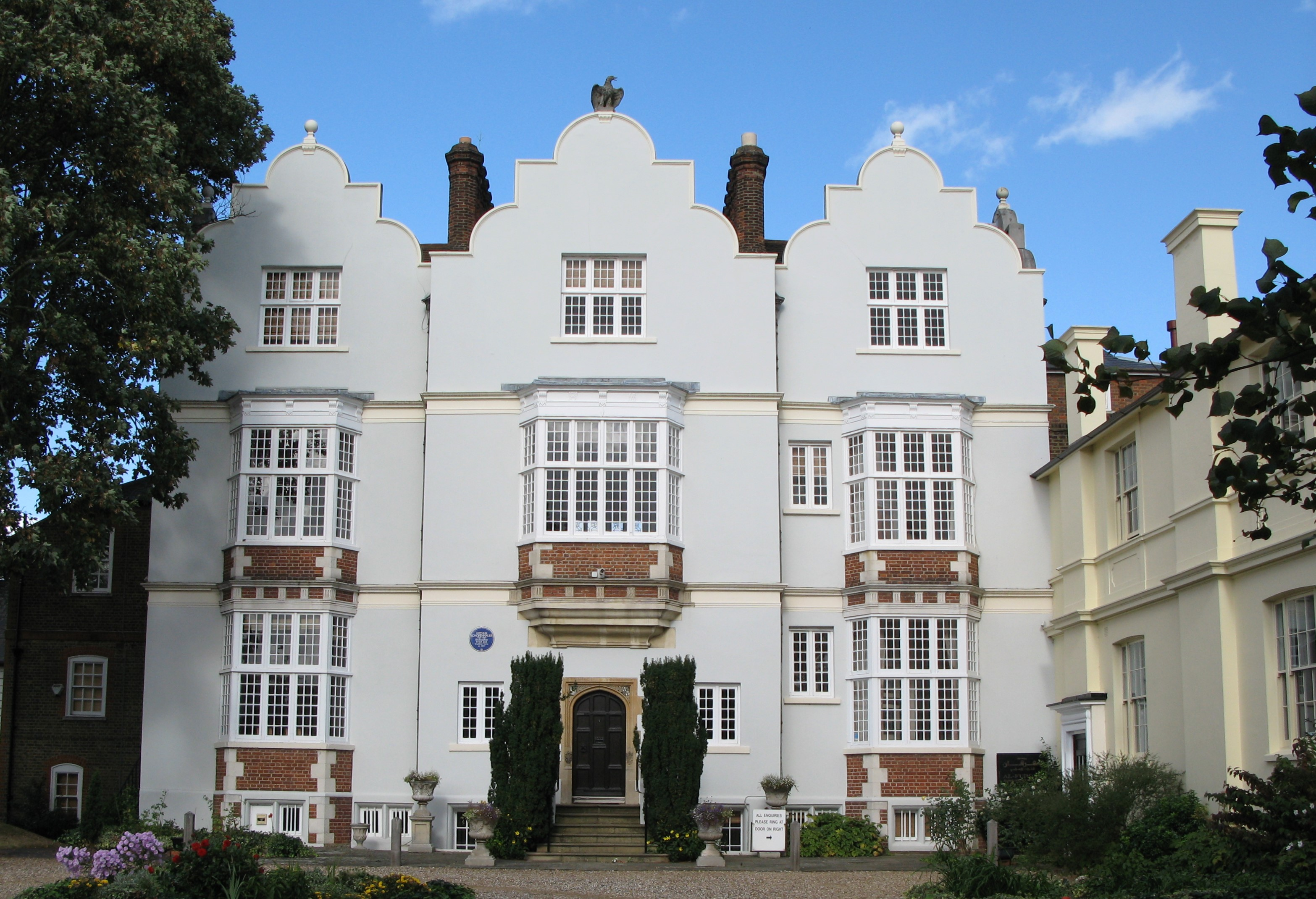
- Interactive map of the Eagle House area

General information
- Type: Residential
- Architectural style: Jacobean
- Location: Wimbledon, London, England
- Coordinates: 51°25′33″N 0°13′10″W
- Completed: 1613

Listed Building – Grade II*
- Official name: Eagle House
- Designated: 1 June 1949
- Reference no.: 1193286

Eagle House is a Grade II* listed house in Wimbledon, London. The house was built in 1613 for Robert Bell who was among the founders of the East India Company. Built in the Jacobean style, much of the original exterior was brick, although little of it is visible on the exterior today.

== History ==
The house has hosted numerous notable figures throughout its time, in the 17th and 18th centuries passing hands variously between the Marquesses of Bath, William Pitt's foreign ministers, and a Lord Grenville who would frequently host his cousin, the Prime Minister, at the house.

The house's ownership was then transferred to that of a Thomas Lancaster who in 1790 transformed it into a school. In 1860, Dr Huntingford took over the school bringing the stone eagle from his previous school and placing it atop the house, giving it its current name.

In 1887 the house was bought and restored by architect Thomas Graham Jackson who extended the property. The house would further be used as a military academy and cultural centre before falling into disrepair in the 2000s and finally being restored and split into flats.

Other notable residents are said to include Arthur Schopenhauer who is commemorated in a blue plaque there.
