= List of places of worship in the Borough of Eastleigh =

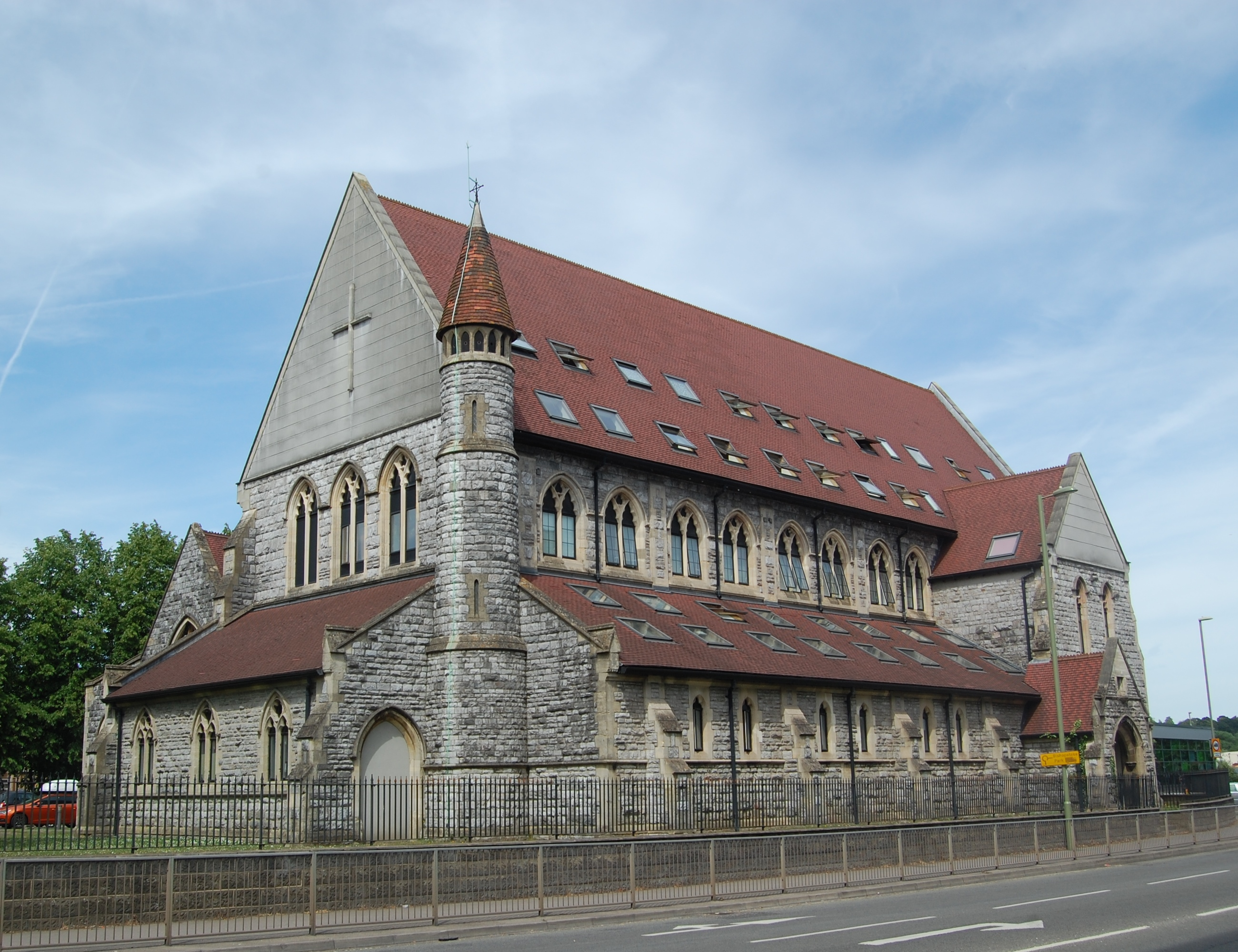
The late Victorian Church of the Resurrection served as the Church of England parish church of Eastleigh town from 1905 until its closure in 1978.

There are nearly 70 current and former places of worship in the borough of Eastleigh in Hampshire, England. Various Christian denominations and groups use 53 churches, chapels and halls for worship and other activities, and a further 14 buildings no longer serve a religious function but survive in alternative uses. Eastleigh is one of 13 local government districts in the county of Hampshire—a large county in central southern England, with a densely populated coastal fringe facing the English Channel and a more rural hinterland. The borough, which is predominantly urban and suburban in character, is centrally located in the south of the county between the major cities of Southampton and Portsmouth and forms part of the South Hampshire conurbation. Its main town is also called Eastleigh.

Many settlements in the borough have ancient origins, being recorded in the Domesday Book, and several churches can trace their origins back to that period. A French-owned alien priory at Hamble-le-Rice controlled three of the oldest churches, all of which survive with varying degrees of alteration; but the ancient chapels at Bishopstoke and North Stoneham have been replaced by newer buildings, and of Botley's medieval church—superseded since the 1830s—only the chancel remains. Most of the borough's places of worship, though, are from the 19th and 20th centuries. "For Victorian churches Hampshire is a bumper county", and this applies especially in the Eastleigh area where the sudden growth of Eastleigh town (which "owes its very existence to [a] railway junction" built in 1841) encouraged the Church of England, the Roman Catholic Church and various Nonconformist denominations to provide churches and chapels for the influx of new residents in the town and its rapidly suburbanising hinterland. Steady population growth continues to the present day, and many new places of worship opened in the 20th century—including churches, chapels and meeting halls for smaller groups such as Spiritualists, Jehovah's Witnesses and Plymouth Brethren.

The 2011 United Kingdom census recorded a majority Christian population in the borough of Eastleigh, and there are no places of worship in the borough for followers of other faiths. The Church of England—the country's Established Church—has the largest stock of church buildings, but many other denominations and groups are represented. A Roman Catholic mission was established in Eastleigh town in 1885; several Baptist chapels opened in the second half of the 19th century; Methodism was strong locally, with 11 chapels in use by 1940; and the Congregational Church and The Salvation Army have had a constant presence in the area now covered by the borough since the 19th century. Since the 1960s the group now known as the Plymouth Brethren Christian Church have also established several meeting rooms in the area, although groups with a Brethren character have worshipped locally for much longer.

Historic England has awarded listed status to nine current and three former places of worship in Eastleigh. A building is defined as "listed" when it is placed on a statutory register of buildings of "special architectural or historic interest" in accordance with the Planning (Listed Buildings and Conservation Areas) Act 1990. The Department for Digital, Culture, Media and Sport, a Government department, is responsible for this; Historic England, a non-departmental public body, acts as an agency of the department to administer the process and advise the department on relevant issues. There are three grades of listing status. Grade I, the highest, is defined as being of "exceptional interest"; Grade II* is used for "particularly important buildings of more than special interest"; and Grade II, the lowest, is used for buildings of "special interest".

== Overview of the borough and its places of worship ==
The borough is located in central southern Hampshire.

The borough of Eastleigh covers 30.8 square miles (80 km^{2}) of land in central southern Hampshire, close to the cities of Southampton and Portsmouth. Southampton Water, a tidal estuary between The Solent and the city of Southampton, forms the southern boundary of the borough; on the other side is the district of New Forest. Clockwise from the southwest, there are land boundaries with the unitary authority of Southampton, the borough of Test Valley, the City of Winchester and the borough of Fareham. The borough's character is largely urban and suburban, and the estimated population as of mid-2016 was nearly 130,000. The main towns are Eastleigh, Chandler's Ford and Hedge End; most residents live in these settlements or in the villages of Bishopstoke, Botley, Bursledon, Fair Oak, Hamble-le-Rice, Horton Heath, Netley and West End. The borough is long from north to south and narrow; the southern part, bounded to the east by the River Hamble, gives the borough a coastline on Southampton Water.

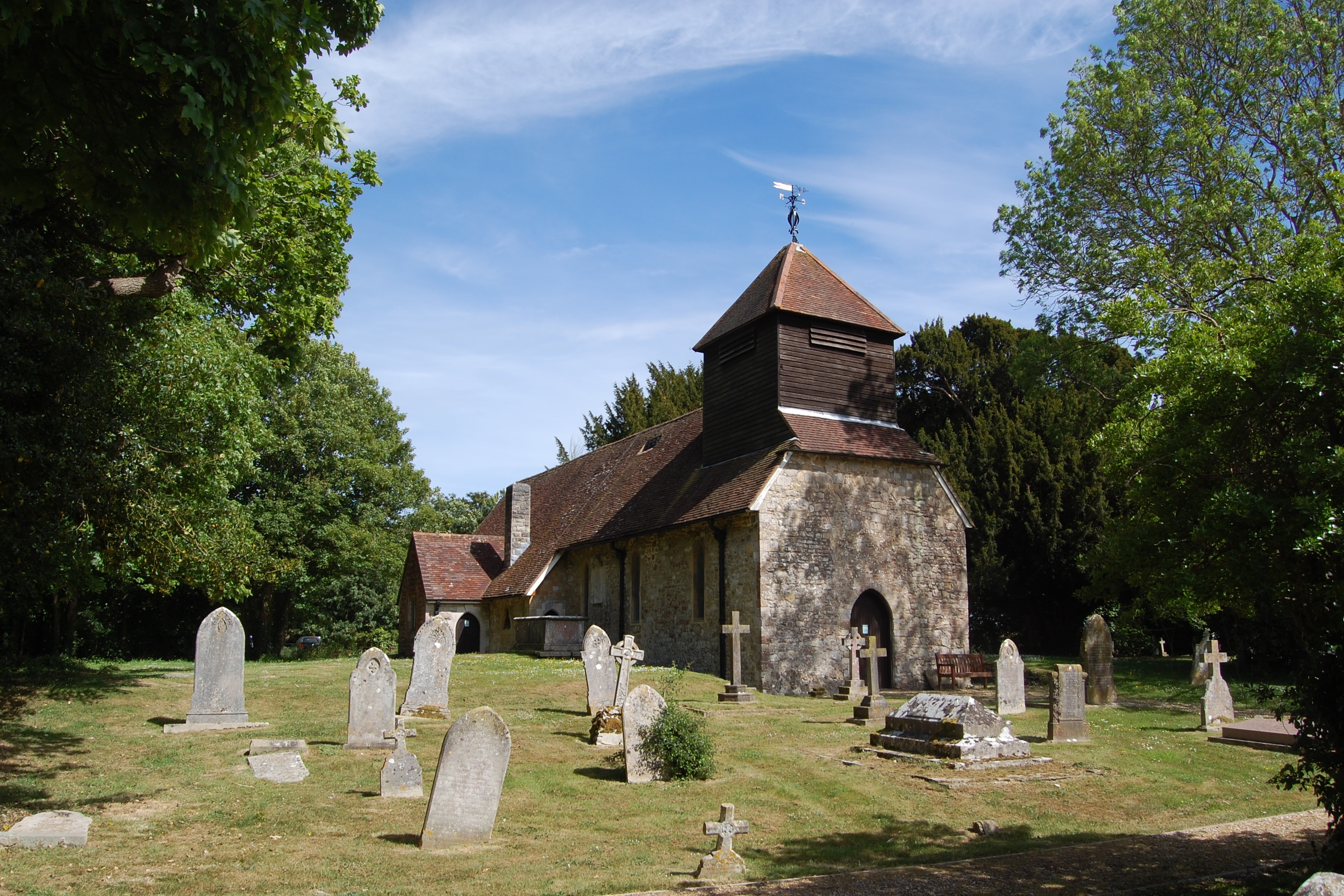
Hound's tiny 13th-century parish church is set in a large churchyard.

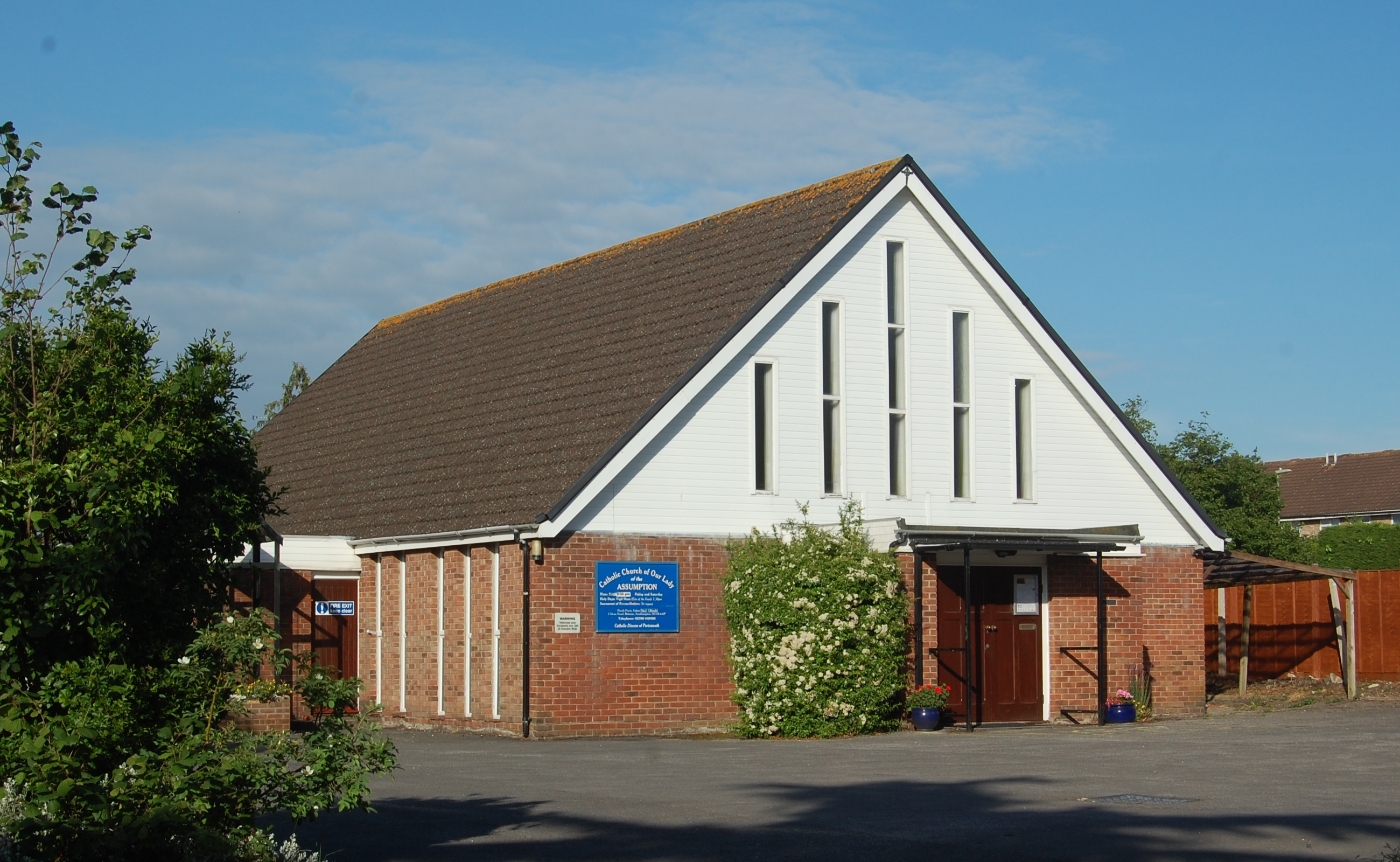
The Catholic church in Hedge End replaced an earlier building in 1975.

The first Christian churches in the area were founded during the Saxon era, but no trace remains of the original 10th-century chapels at North Stoneham or Bishopstoke. These were recorded in the Domesday survey of 1086, along with the church at Botley (originally dedicated to All Saints; later to St Bartholomew); but no mention was made of the ancient churches at Hamble-le-Rice, Hound and Bursledon. St Andrew's Church at Hamble was first recorded in 1128 and was an alien priory controlled by Tiron Abbey in France; this explains its unusual dimensions, as its chancel and nave were effectively two separate churches attached end to end, serving the priory and local parishioners respectively. The priory also held St Mary's Church at Hound, "a complete Early English Gothic hamlet church" which is mostly 13th-century in form but which retains some stonework from an older building, and St Leonard's Church at Bursledon—built in the second half of the 12th century but much altered, although a remodelling of 1888 restored some features lost in "large-scale alterations of 1832–33". The "intriguing" St Nicholas' Church at North Stoneham is medieval and has some work from c. 1230, but its appearance has also changed greatly over the centuries.

As well as the restoration and remodelling of the ancient Church of England parish churches, much new churchbuilding was carried out in the villages in the 19th century, especially during the Victorian era, to provide new places of worship for Anglicans. The old church south of Botley village was replaced by one in the village centre in 1836, extended in 1859 and further reworked in the 1890s. It took its predecessor's original dedication to All Saints. Bishopstoke's original church was replaced in 1825, but its tower became structurally unsafe and a new, larger church was built on a new site in 1889–91. Hound's tiny church, although still in use, was superseded by a larger one nearer the centre of the parish's population in Netley in 1885–86. The sudden growth of the railway town of Eastleigh between 1860 and 1900—from nothing to a population of over 7,000, with further rapid growth thereafter—also prompted a period of rapid churchbuilding by the Church of England, both in the town and in nearby settlements which became suburbanised. The Church of the Resurrection (closed 1978) near Eastleigh railway station was started in 1868 and became the town's parish church in 1905; All Saints served the south side of town from 1908 and is now the parish church; Chandler's Ford, originally in North Stoneham parish, had a tin tabernacle from 1881, replaced by a permanent church in 1904; St Thomas's Church at Fair Oak near Bishopstoke was built in 1863; Hedge End's church, with its prominent spire, opened in 1874; and at nearby West End, a small chapel of 1838 was replaced on a larger scale fifty years later. As suburban growth continued in the second half of 20th century, Chandler's Ford, Bishopstoke, Hedge End and Bursledon all grew large enough for additional Anglican churches to be built—in 1960, 1962, the early 1990s and 2000 respectively—and the late 20th-century Boyatt Wood estate in Eastleigh was served by the newly built St Peter's Church from 1991.

Roman Catholics in the area were served from 1882 by a mission chapel founded in Eastleigh town by St Peter's Church, Winchester. It became independent three years later, and the first stone of the present Holy Cross Church was laid on 14 September 1901. A church was built at Chandler's Ford in 1938 and substantially extended just over 50 years later; for some years it was part of Eastleigh's parish. Both are now part of a larger parish which includes the church at Fair Oak, opened in 1978. In the south of the borough, a church was provided at Netley in 1949, while Hedge End and West End's Catholic churches were founded by Fr Dennis Walshe, priest-in-charge of the large parish of Bitterne from 1944. After World War II he bought sites in both villages, as well as at Thornhill in Southampton, for future churches. A joint parish was formed covering both Hedge End and West End; its first parish priest built St Brigid's Church in West End and the original Church of the Assumption in Hedge End, which was replaced in 1975 by the present building.

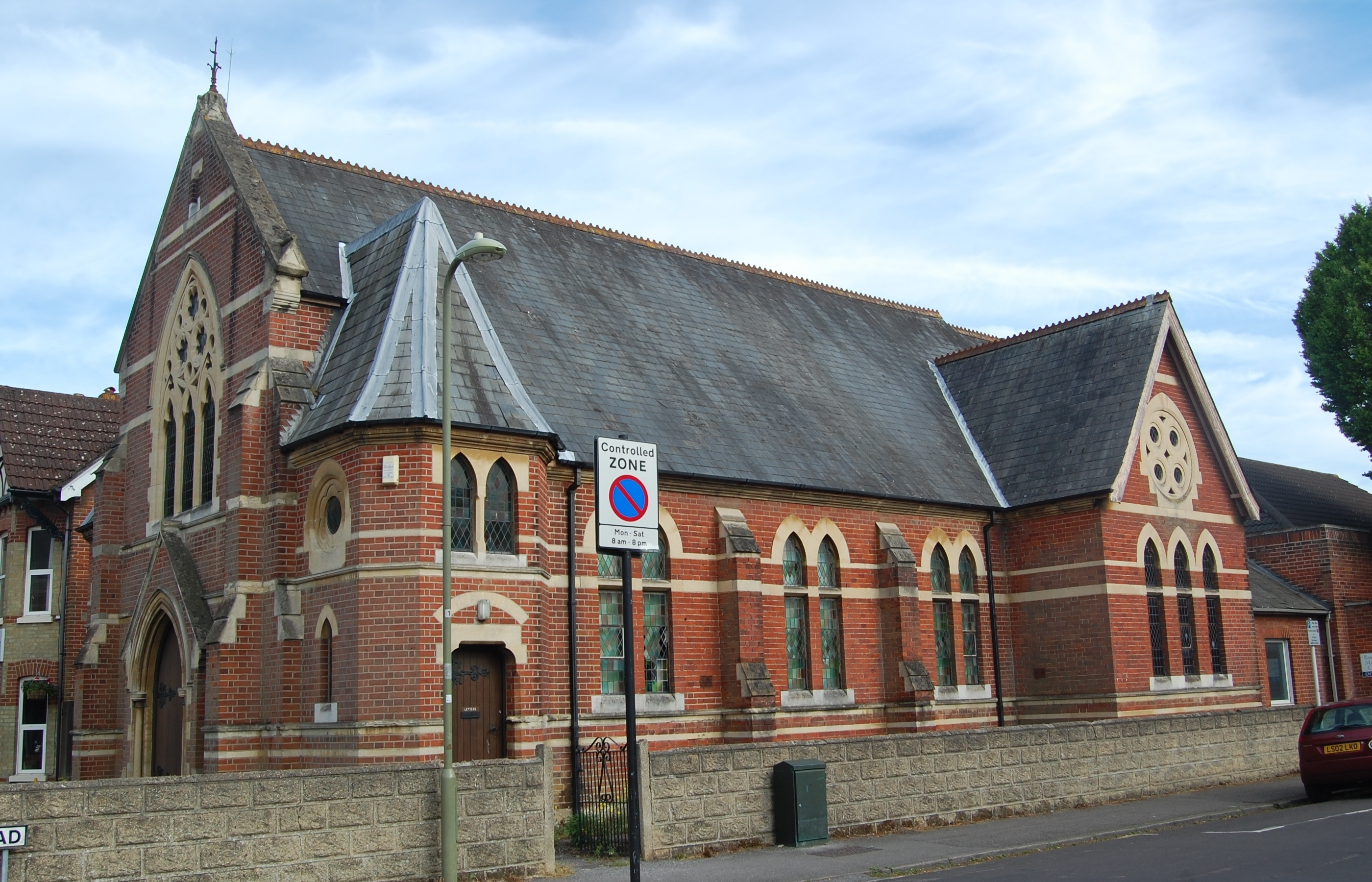
The United Methodist chapel in Eastleigh closed in 1959 and is now a Masonic hall.

The Methodist Church of Great Britain documented all the chapels it owned as of 1940 in a statistical return published in 1947. Within the boundaries of the present borough of Eastleigh at that time, there were 11 chapels representing the denomination's three historic strands: Wesleyanism, Primitive Methodism and the United Methodist Church. Crowdhill, Eastleigh town, Netley and West End had chapels which were originally Wesleyan; there were Primitive Methodist churches at Chandler's Ford and West End; and Bishopstoke had two United Methodist chapels, while there was one each in Eastleigh town, Hedge End and West End. Only one of these buildings is still occupied by a Methodist congregation, another four are no longer in religious use, and the others have been demolished. Hedge End Methodist Church was registered as a United Methodist Church in 1924, replacing an older building, and remains in use. In Eastleigh, the Wesleyan church was built in 1893 and the United Methodist (originally Bible Christian) chapel in Leigh Road opened in 1904. The latter closed in 1959 and was sold for conversion; the 1893 building served the town's Methodists from that year until its demolition in the early 1980s, when it was replaced by a new church (St Andrew's) nearby. There was also a short-lived Primitive Methodist chapel in the town. The Wesleyan chapels at Crowdhill and Netley still stand but were deregistered in 1980 and 2011 respectively. Chandler's Ford's original Primitive Methodist chapel of 1900 also survives in alternative use but was replaced with a new church nearby in 1957, and a new Methodist church opened in Bishopstoke in 1959 to supersede the two buildings there. None of West End's three chapels survive; they were at Burnett's Lane, Chapel Road and Swaythling Road.

The United Reformed Church denomination, formed from the amalgamation of the Congregational Church and the Presbyterian Church of England in 1972, is no longer represented in the district. Churches at Chandler's Ford and Hedge End, both originally Congregational, closed in 2021 and 2023 respectively. Another chapel in Bursledon went out of use earlier, and in Eastleigh the former United Reformed church has been demolished, having been deregistered in 1993. The town has a modern Salvation Army citadel, though, and the original premises on the High Street still stand: built in 1887, the hall is now the town's museum. A large new Salvation Army community centre and church opened in 2014 in Hedge End, again replacing older premises; but the cause in Fair Oak lasted only four years before its building passed into secular use. Brethren groups became established in Eastleigh in the 1880s, when a small assembly met regularly in a room in the town's cheese market. The first Gospel hall was built on the High Street in 1887, and another was registered on Northlands Road in 1908. The meeting room at The Crescent dates from 1967 and is now part of the Brethren sect known as the Plymouth Brethren Christian Church. Since 1989 the main regional meeting hall for this group has been at Chestnut Avenue in the south of the town, and there are smaller meeting rooms at Hedge End, West End, Chandler's Ford and Allbrook.

== Religious affiliation ==
According to the 2011 United Kingdom census, 125,199 lived in the borough of Eastleigh. Of these, 61.89% identified themselves as Christian, 0.78% were Muslim, 0.68% were Sikh, 0.66% were Hindu, 0.28% were Buddhist, 0.07% were Jewish, 0.4% followed another religion, 28.47% claimed no religious affiliation and 6.77% did not state their religion. The proportions of Christians and people who followed no religion were higher than the figures in England as a whole (59.38% and 24.74% respectively). Islam, Judaism, Hinduism, Sikhism and Buddhism had a lower following in the borough than in the country overall: in 2011, 5.02% of people in England were Muslim, 1.52% were Hindu, 0.79% were Sikh, 0.49% were Jewish and 0.45% were Buddhist.

== Administration ==
=== Anglican churches ===
With one exception, all Anglican churches in the borough are part of the Anglican Diocese of Winchester, which is based at Winchester Cathedral. The diocese has 16 deaneries plus the cathedral's own separate deanery. Eastleigh Deanery is responsible for the churches in Bishopstoke (St Mary and St Paul), Boyatt Wood, Bursledon (St Leonard and St Paul), Chandler's Ford (St Boniface and St Martin-in-the-Wood at Hiltingbury), Eastleigh town (All Saints and St Francis), Fair Oak, Hamble, Hedge End (St John the Evangelist and St Luke), Hound and West End. St Nicolas Church at North Stoneham is part of Southampton Deanery. All Saints Church at Botley is administered by the Bishop's Waltham Deanery of the Anglican Diocese of Portsmouth, which is based at Portsmouth Cathedral.

=== Roman Catholic churches ===
The Catholic churches in Chandler's Ford, Eastleigh town, Fair Oak, Hedge End, Netley and West End are part of the Roman Catholic Diocese of Portsmouth, whose seat is the Cathedral of St John the Evangelist in Portsmouth. St Edward the Confessor's Church at Chandler's Ford, Holy Cross Church in Eastleigh and St Swithun Wells Church at Fair Oak are three of the six churches in St Swithun Wells parish, (Note: The others are in Bishop's Waltham (City of Winchester district), North Baddesley and Romsey (both in Test Valley district).) which is part of the Three Rivers Pastoral Area of Deanery 4 in the Diocese. The parish covers a large area of mostly rural land in West Hampshire, from the villages of the Meon Valley in the east to the county boundary with Wiltshire in the west, and the northern suburbs of Southampton in the south to the A30 road and villages around Winchester to the north. The churches of Our Lady of the Assumption at Hedge End and St Brigid at West End are in the Hedge End parish and the Southampton East Pastoral Area of Deanery 8. This parish covers the suburban villages of Hedge End and West End and the nearby villages of Botley and Boorley Green. The parish of Netley, served by the Church of the Annunciation, is in the same pastoral area and deanery. Its boundaries are the River Hamble, Southampton Water, the Southampton city boundary and the M27 motorway; the villages of Bursledon, Hamble, Hound, Netley and Old Netley are included.

=== Other denominations ===
Three of the borough's four Methodist churches—at Bishopstoke, Chandler's Ford and Eastleigh—are part of the 17-church Winchester, Eastleigh & Romsey Methodist Circuit. Hedge End Methodist Church is in the Southampton Methodist Circuit. Eastleigh and Horton Heath Baptist Churches and West End Free Church belong to the Southern Counties Baptist Association. Emmanuel Baptist Church in Eastleigh is a member of the Old Baptist Union, a "small group of evangelical Baptist churches" established in 1880 whose doctrines are based on those of the original General Baptists of the 17th century. Allbrook Evangelical Free Church and Hedge End Strict Baptist Chapel are part of GraceNet UK, an association of Reformed Evangelical Christian churches and organisations. Bishopstoke Evangelical Church belongs to two Evangelical groups: the Fellowship of Independent Evangelical Churches (FIEC), a pastoral and administrative network of about 500 churches with an evangelical outlook, and Affinity (formerly the British Evangelical Council), a network of conservative Evangelical congregations throughout Great Britain. Eastleigh Spiritualist Church belongs to the Spiritualists' National Union and is within the organisation's Southern District, which covers Hampshire, the Isle of Wight, Dorset and Wiltshire.

== Listed status ==
Grade	Criteria
Grade I	Buildings of exceptional interest, sometimes considered to be internationally important.
Grade II*	Particularly important buildings of more than special interest.
Grade II	Buildings of national importance and special interest.

Five churches in the borough are Grade II*-listed and seven (including two former churches) are listed at Grade II. As of February 2001, there were 179 listed buildings in the borough of Eastleigh: none with Grade I status, 9 listed at Grade II* and 170 with Grade II status.

== Current places of worship ==
Current places of worship
Name	Image	Location	Denomination/ Affiliation	Grade	Notes	Refs
Allbrook Evangelical Free Church		Allbrook; 50.986705°N 1.349839°W	Evangelical	–	There was a mission chapel at Allbrook from 1886. A chapel called Allbrook Free Church succeeded it; it was registered in July 1979 for undenominational worship. This was succeeded by the Church on the Hill, registered with that name in January 1987 at a different location on Allbrook Hill to the north of Eastleigh town (church sign pictured). At that time it had a Baptist affiliation, but has now adopted the name and character of an Evangelical Free church.	
Brethren Meeting Room (More images)		Allbrook; 50.989341°N 1.347016°W	Plymouth Brethren Christian Church	–	Prior to its sale to the Plymouth Brethren Christian Church for conversion into one of their local meeting rooms, this two-storey red-brick building was used as a private school. The ground floor was converted for religious use following the granting of planning permission in November 2014.	
St Mary's Church (More images)		Bishopstoke; 50.976022°N 1.335343°W	Anglican	II	This is the fourth parish church to serve Bishopstoke. The old (10th-century) church was replaced a century later, then this in turn was rebuilt in 1825 for £1,800. Structural defects and a poor location by the river meant a new site was bought and a new church built in 1890–91 for £4,200. Designed by Edward Prioleau Warren in the Decorated Gothic Revival style and built of flint and Bath stone, it originally lacked a tower: one was added in 1909 to commemorate Henry Keppel, who owned a house nearby.	
St Paul's Church (More images)		Bishopstoke; 50.964809°N 1.321438°W	Anglican	–	This church dates from 1962. It was built to provide extra capacity in the growing village of Bishopstoke.	
Bishopstoke Evangelical Church (More images)		Bishopstoke; 50.974658°N 1.334339°W	Evangelical	–	This was registered with the name Bishopstoke Independent Evangelical Church in April 1955. Its marriage licence was granted in July 1956.	
Bishopstoke Methodist Church (More images)		Bishopstoke; 50.973311°N 1.333580°W	Methodist	–	The present church on Sedgwick Road dates from 1957 and was registered for worship in November of that year and for marriages in February 1959, but Bible Christian Methodists worshipped in the area from the mid-19th century and Bishopstoke previously had two United Methodist chapels, both extant in 1940: a tin tabernacle on Spring Lane (established in 1896) and a brick building at Stoke Common. (Note: At 50.970819°N 1.336585°W and 50.978887°N 1.329144°W respectively.)	
All Saints Church (More images)		Botley; 50.914290°N 1.273779°W	Anglican	II	The old parish church of St Bartholomew a mile south of the market town was replaced by this centrally located yellow-brick Gothic Revival church, designed by James William Wild, in 1836. John Colson added the chancel in 1859, and Thomas Graham Jackson undertook more work in 1892 and 1895. The narthex he added in the latter year was replaced by a prominent extension in 2008. The 12th-century font, possibly from St Bartholomew's Church, was dug up from a field in 1740 and eventually taken here.	
St Peter's Church (More images)		Boyatt Wood; 50.978096°N 1.361167°W	Anglican	–	Historically, the Allbrook and Boyatt areas were in the parish of Otterbourne and never had a church of their own. Boyatt Wood was later developed as a postwar housing estate, and St Peter's Church was dedicated on 12 April 1991.	
St Leonard's Church (More images)		Bursledon; 50.884871°N 1.306771°W	Anglican	II*	The church was founded in the mid-12th century but was altered substantially in the early 1830s. J. D. Sedding reversed many of the changes during his work on the church in 1888, restoring and conserving original features and adding his own elements such as the Perpendicular Gothic east window (in which the stained glass depicting the Ascension of Jesus is also to his design) and aisled transepts. He also built the "picturesque" half-timbered belfry and elaborate timber porch across the entrance.	
St Paul's Church (More images)		Bursledon; 50.884828°N 1.322954°W	Anglican	–	The Pilands Wood estate was developed in the 1950s, and a Reema construction prefabricated church was erected in 1958 at a cost of £6,000, most of which came from the War Damage Commission as compensation for the destroyed St Paul's Church in Southampton. A new, larger brick-built church and community centre designed by architects Radley House Partnership (scheme architect Michael Cardin) opened on the site in June 2000.	
St Boniface's Church (More images)		Chandler's Ford; 50.986315°N 1.385781°W	Anglican	–	The first Anglican church in Chandler's Ford—then in the parish of North Stoneham—was a small tin tabernacle erected in 1881. A larger one on the Bournemouth Road replaced it in 1888–89. Land on Hursley Road was donated in 1904 for a permanent church; in its original state (nave only; designed by George Frederick Bodley and Thomas Garner) it was dedicated on 4 October of that year. Its capacity was 230 and construction cost £3,400. A parish was formed in 1910. The chancel was added in 1929–30 to the design of Cancellor & Sawyer. There is one Hardman & Co. stained glass window.	
Velmore Church (More images)		Chandler's Ford; 50.971661°N 1.383154°W	Evangelical	–	The church was built on the postwar Velmore Estate and was registered in January 1968 under the name Velmore Chapel.	
Chandler's Ford Methodist Church (More images)		Chandler's Ford; 50.986882°N 1.375826°W	Methodist	–	When the former Primitive Methodist chapel of 1900 on Brownhill Road became too small, land was purchased on Winchester Road and a multi-use hall and church was built as a predecessor to a permanent church. The foundation stone was laid on 29 September 1956 and the building opened about eight months later. The present church (pictured) was built alongside at a cost of £30,000 and opened on 22 November 1969; it was registered two days later. Structural defects forced it to close between December 1977 and February 1980; while repairs were undertaken, services and other activities transferred to the hall. Another extension was completed in 1993.	
Brethren Meeting Room (More images)		Chandler's Ford; 50.986507°N 1.382004°W	Plymouth Brethren Christian Church	–	Planning permission to convert this bungalow into a Brethren meeting room was granted in June 1999.	
Brethren Meeting Room (More images)		Chandler's Ford; 50.989733°N 1.373594°W	Plymouth Brethren Christian Church	–	Planning permission for the construction of this meeting room behind Merdon Avenue (entrance pictured) was granted in June 1990, and it was registered for worship in November 1991.	
St Edward the Confessor's Church (More images)		Chandler's Ford; 50.993141°N 1.367140°W	Roman Catholic	–	This church was funded by Helen Christian of Otterbourne Manor as a memorial to her husband Edward Christian. Built to the design of W.H. Randoll Blacking in the Arts and Crafts style, it has exterior walls of flint and mortar, a squat corner tower with a weatherboarded belfry "in traditional Hampshire style" and mullioned windows. A large extension was added in 1989 by Robert Potter and Partners; a distinctive feature is an "impressive, prow-like" window with modern stained glass. The church was consecrated on 10 March 1938 and registered for worship four years later; its registration for marriages dates from May 1966.	
All Saints Church (More images)		Eastleigh; 50.963483°N 1.355472°W	Anglican	–	Rapid growth south of Eastleigh town centre prompted the founding of a mission church dedicated to All Saints in 1891. In 1908 land was also acquired for a larger church, which was built in 1908–10 to the design of John Colson and N.C.H. Nisbett. The large stone Decorated/Perpendicular Gothic Revival church was consecrated on 4 July 1910 and was given the same dedication. After the Church of the Resurrection closed, All Saints became the parish church in 1981. The mission church was used as parish hall and then a community centre until it was destroyed by fire in 1989 and demolished, and the church itself was damaged by a lightning strike four years later.	
St Francis' Church (More images)		Eastleigh; 50.963940°N 1.374181°W	Anglican	–	This is a combined church and church hall in the west of Eastleigh town, served by All Saints Church.	
Eastleigh Baptist Church (More images)		Eastleigh; 50.967455°N 1.354811°W	Baptist	–	Baptist meetings in Eastleigh moved in quick succession from a tent to a shop and then a hall on Factory Road. This became a Railway Mission hall when the congregation moved to a new building on Desborough Road in 1896, which was in turn superseded by the present church, registered as Union Baptist Chapel, in June 1905 (the 1896 building became the church hall; click for image). This was built on land already acquired in 1896. The architect was John Wills; his chosen design was "old-fashioned Gothic [Revival]". The original galleried interior is largely unchanged, but BCH Architects undertook a refurbishment programme in 2006–07.	
Emmanuel Baptist Church (More images)		Eastleigh; 50.961875°N 1.356439°W	Baptist (Old Baptist Union)	–	The building was originally a Congregational mission hall, registered between April 1922 and 28 September 1934. It was taken over by members of the Old Baptist Union in 1943.	
Elim Pentecostal Church (More images)		Eastleigh; 50.968446°N 1.359088°W	Elim Pentecostal	–	This church opened in 1967, replacing an earlier Elim Pentecostal church building in the town.	
Kingdom Hall (More images)		Eastleigh; 50.960334°N 1.371624°W	Jehovah's Witnesses	–	This Kingdom Hall for local Jehovah's Witnesses opened on the south side of Eastleigh in 1985 and was registered in March of that year.	
St Andrew's Methodist Church (More images)		Eastleigh; 50.965892°N 1.351967°W	Methodist	–	This new church opened on Blenheim Road in 1983 to replace Eastleigh's "handsome and commodious" 90-year-old Wesleyan chapel, a 450-capacity building of stone and brick, which was sold for demolition and redevelopment.	
Junction Church		Eastleigh; 50.967781°N 1.353777°W	Non-denominational	–	The congregation of this church occupies an office building on Eastleigh High Street. It was registered for their use in October 2017. It is associated with the neo-charismatic Newfrontiers movement.	
Thrive Church (Pavilion on the Park)		Eastleigh; 50.967221°N 1.373319°W	Non-denominational (Pioneer)	–	Established in 1985 as Eastleigh Christian Fellowship, the church became a congregation of New Community Church based at Central Hall in Southampton in 1999, taking on the name New Community Eastleigh and becoming part of the national Pioneer network of churches. The church separated from New Community in 2017, renaming itself as Thrive Church, and becoming a member of the Pioneer network in its own right. As Thrive Church, services were held at Barton Peveril Sixth Form College and the Cherbourg Road campus of Crestwood Community School prior to relocating to the Pavilion on the Park.	
Brethren Meeting Room (More images)		Eastleigh; 50.963016°N 1.383856°W	Plymouth Brethren Christian Church	–	The main meeting room for the Southampton and Eastleigh area moved to this site in 1989 from its previous location in the Portswood area of Southampton, where it had been based since 1968.	
Brethren Meeting Room (More images)		Eastleigh; 50.972566°N 1.351232°W	Plymouth Brethren Christian Church	–	This local Brethren meeting room was registered in May 1967.	
Holy Cross Church (More images)		Eastleigh; 50.969275°N 1.354228°W	Roman Catholic	–	A Catholic mission had been founded in the town in 1882 by the church at Winchester, and was separately parished from 1885. A tin tabernacle dating from 1888 or 1890 was succeeded by the present Gothic Revival church of 1901 designed by Alexander Scoles, which was consecrated on 13 August 1902 and registered for marriages seven weeks later. It is a tall cruciform building of red brick and limestone. Reordering in 1962 included the addition of aisles with flat roofs. The parish included St Edward the Confessor's Church in Chandler's Ford in the 1960s.	
Salvation Army Citadel (More images)		Eastleigh; 50.966060°N 1.353179°W	Salvation Army	–	The present Salvation Army place of worship was registered in June 1991, succeeding smaller premises on the High Street.	
Eastleigh Spiritualist Church (More images)		Eastleigh; 50.964617°N 1.352035°W	Spiritualist	–	Spiritualists have worshipped in a building on this site since 1955, although the present church opened in 1994 and was registered for marriages three years later.	
St Thomas's Church (More images)		Fair Oak; 50.965010°N 1.296949°W	Anglican	–	Fair Oak's parish church was built of flint and stone in 1863 to the Early English Gothic Revival design of John Colson. The contrasting interior features red and yellow brickwork. The church has a nave, chancel and apse, but no spire or tower—just a bell-cot at the west end. There are several stained glass windows of various dates, including some by the firm of James Powell and Sons.	
Sandy Lane Gospel Hall (More images)		Fair Oak; 50.964972°N 1.305187°W	Open Brethren	–	This Gospel hall dates from the 1930s and was registered for marriages in February 1949.	
St Swithun Wells Church (More images)		Fair Oak; 50.961028°N 1.306336°W	Roman Catholic	–	Catholics in Fair Oak were provided with their own church, dedicated to the Hampshire martyr Swithun Wells, in 1978. It was registered for worship and marriages in August and December of that year respectively.	
St Andrew's Church (More images)		Hamble-le-Rice; 50.858083°N 1.317940°W	Anglican	II*	The church's origins as a 12th-century priory mean that it "retain[s] features of conventual ... design": it has a long, wide, aisleless nave and a chancel of similar dimensions. The nave is contemporary with the three-stage west tower; the chancel was probably rebuilt in its present form in the mid-13th century. Some additions were made in the 19th century, including by Henry Woodyer (an organ chamber, now converted into a Lady Chapel). Much of the stained glass dates from this era as well.	
St John the Evangelist's Church (More images)		Hedge End; 50.908826°N 1.309453°W	Anglican	II	John Colson's church, "typical" of his style, was built in 1873–74. It is Early English/Decorated Gothic Revival in style, built of Swanage and Bath stone, and has a three-bay nave, a chancel with an apse and a three-stage tower topped with a tall, landmark spire. Clayton and Bell designed the stained glass windows in the apse in 1880.	
St Luke's Church (More images)		Hedge End; 50.925468°N 1.302614°W	Anglican	–	The church was built in the early 1990s to serve the northern part of Hedge End. It is a brick, oval-shaped building with a gallery and several multifunctional rooms.	
King's Community Church (More images)		Hedge End; 50.912222°N 1.315763°W	Evangelical	–	The building was registered with the name Sovereign Place in April 2000. It is part of a two-church partnership covering the Solent region, with another worship community based in Totton.	
Hedge End Methodist Church (More images)		Hedge End; 50.910845°N 1.306847°W	Methodist	–	This brick church was built as a 300-capacity United Methodist chapel in 1924, replacing an earlier chapel.	
Brethren Meeting Room (More images)		Hedge End; 50.905101°N 1.314309°W	Plymouth Brethren Christian Church	–	Construction of this meeting room, intended to replace the smaller premises in Granada Road, was authorised in 2006.	
Church of Our Lady of the Assumption (More images)		Hedge End; 50.912340°N 1.303078°W	Roman Catholic	–	Fr Dennis Walshe, the priest-in-charge of Bitterne parish in neighbouring Southampton since 1944, bought land in Hedge End for a church in 1958. A temporary chapel opened in 1964, then in 1975 the present building was erected and registered for worship. It was not consecrated until 23 March 1984. Hedge End and West End were originally in the parish of Christ the King, Bitterne but were separated in the 1960s.	
Salvation Army Hall (More images)		Hedge End; 50.929095°N 1.306100°W	Salvation Army	–	Construction work on this new church and community centre on the Dowd's Farm estate started in March 2013, and the church was registered the following year, replacing a hall elsewhere in the village which had been registered in March 1967.	
Hedge End Strict Baptist Chapel (More images)		Hedge End; 50.911766°N 1.309959°W	Strict Baptist	–	Although it was recertified as a place of worship in 1978, this "small brick-built chapel on the corner of a lane, partially hidden by large trees", was built in 1845 for Strict Baptist worshippers.	
St Martin-in-the-Wood Church (More images)		Hiltingbury; 50.999087°N 1.375600°W	Anglican	–	This church was built in 1960 as a combined place of worship and community facility to serve new housing to the north of Chandler's Ford.	
Horton Heath Baptist Church (More images)		Horton Heath; 50.948959°N 1.296244°W	Baptist	–	The church has occupied Horton Heath's community centre since the closure and demolition of Union Baptist Chapel in the early 21st century. A "plain building" with elements of Classical and Gothic Revival architecture, it was built in 1862 and registered for marriages in 1906.	
St Mary's Church (More images)		Hound; 50.876181°N 1.332160°W	Anglican	II*	Originally associated with the priory and church at Hamble-le-Rice, this tiny Early English Gothic chapel is now part of the parish of Netley and avoided large-scale alteration or extension in the Victorian era because a larger church was constructed there. Some work was carried out in 1861–62 and 1920, though, and a highly regarded stained glass design by Patrick Reyntiens was installed in the east window in 1959. Simply a "plain rectangle", the church consists of a nave and chancel, a vestry and a large wooden bell-turret. The interior has been described as "one of the most memorable in Hampshire".	
St Edward the Confessor's Church (More images)		Netley; 50.877632°N 1.355565°W	Anglican	II	Occupying a site close to the ruined Netley Abbey, Netley's new parish church took its historic dedication to Edward the Confessor. J. D. Sedding's Perpendicular Gothic Revival design, "full of careful detailing", has a three-stage battlemented tower, an aisled nave, a chancel with a vestry and organ chamber on the north side, and a rose window in the west wall. A 13th-century monument made of Purbeck Marble was moved here from the abbey.	
Church of the Annunciation (More images)		Netley; 50.874100°N 1.348947°W	Roman Catholic	–	The church was built as a church hall in 1949 for £3,000 onland acquired two years earlier and was registered for worship in September of that year. Consecration followed seven years later. A larger church was planned but was never built; the "modest low brick building" still serves as a church. In the 1960s the parish priest also celebrated weekly Masses in the Memorial Hall in Hamble-le-Rice.	
St Nicolas' Church (More images)		North Stoneham; 50.953510°N 1.374147°W	Anglican	II*	"Only fragments" survive of the medieval church on this site: notably the west window in the tower, dated to c. 1230. The tower itself is Perpendicular Gothic in style and of three stages. The church was substantially rebuilt in the 16th century, particularly around 1534 when the dedication to Saint Nicholas was first documented. The aisles of the nave terminate in chapels, and the east end has three gables. Most of the stained glass was destroyed by World War II bombing; the glass now in the east window was designed in 1952.	
St James's Church (More images)		West End; 50.924568°N 1.338409°W	Anglican	II	The church opened in 1890, replacing an earlier building of 1838 (founded two years earlier). A bulky, large exterior of brick from Otterbourne, also featuring some stone decorations and dressings, gives way to an "impressive" interior with more stone detailing, particularly in the north and south aisles where the arcades are of Bath stone. The style is Decorated/Perpendicular Gothic Revival; Arthur Blomfield was the architect. A tower was intended but was never built. Inside, the 15th-century font was "apparently recovered from a local river".	
West End Free Church (More images)		West End; 50.923834°N 1.335230°W	Baptist	–	West End Evangelical Mission Hall was erected in 1884 or 1885 in the garden of its founder, John St. Barbe Baker (father of biologist and botanist Richard St. Barbe Baker). The church joined the Baptist Union in the 1960s and was registered as a Baptist church in August 1968. It is now owned by West End Christian Fellowship, who maintain worship of an Evangelical character in the building.	
Anchor Community Church (More images)		West End; 50.933076°N 1.331000°W	Non-denominational	–	The church building was originally registered in February 1975 and has had two previous identities: at that time it was called West End Evangelical Church, but by the time its original registration was cancelled in June 1992 it had the name Southampton Community Church.	
Brethren Meeting Room (More images)		West End; 50.924247°N 1.344980°W	Plymouth Brethren Christian Church	–	Planning permission to build this Brethren meeting room was granted in April 1996.	
St Brigid's Church (More images)		West End; 50.927575°N 1.331702°W	Roman Catholic	–	West End was originally in the parish of Christ the King in Bitterne. Its priest bought land behind West End's main street in 1958 for £1,800 and created a separate parish for the village and neighbouring Hedge End. Mass was celebrated at the village hall until the new parish's first priest opened the permanent church. Dedicated to Brigid of Kildare and registered in January 1968, it is a plain brick and concrete structure with a prominent gabled façade.	

== Former places of worship ==
Former places of worship
Name	Image	Location	Denomination/ Affiliation	Grade	Notes	Refs
St Bartholomew's Church (More images)		Botley; 50.904796°N 1.275437°W	Anglican	II*	The old parish church of Botley is 1 mile (1.6 km) south of the village. What remains is only the chancel of the original building: the nave collapsed in the 1830s after a tree fell on it. The structure is 13th-century with an older doorway retrieved from the ruins and reset in the west wall. Above this is a tall wooden bell-cot. The east window is Perpendicular Gothic in style and dates from the 15th century. The church was formally declared redundant in May 1982.	
Bursledon Congregational Church (More images)		Bursledon; 50.889232°N 1.315016°W	Congregational	–	A Congregational chapel existed at Bursledon by 1908. It was replaced by the present building, which is now disused and empty, in 1930.	
Chapel of Our Lady of the Rosary (More images)		Bursledon; 50.881854°N 1.310938°W	Roman Catholic	II	Originally the ballroom of a house called Greyladyes, this was converted into a private Catholic chapel by its resident Emmeline Shawe-Storey when she converted to Catholicism in 1906. A large stone bellcote on the high outer wall made its use clear. After her death it was sold to the Diocese and became a public church: by 1960 it had a weekly Mass and was part of the parish of St Patrick's Church, Woolston. The interior "was furnished to embarrassing richness"; an altar front and table at the Catholic church in Netley, both elaborately carved, are believed to have been moved there when this chapel closed, while other fittings went to St Agatha's Church in Portsmouth.	
Chandler's Ford Methodist Chapel (More images)		Chandler's Ford; 50.988221°N 1.375333°W	Methodist	–	Methodist worship took place at a cottage at Fryern Hill from 1852 to 1857. The cause died out, but in 1898 the minister of Eastleigh Primitive Methodist Chapel gave help towards the opening of a chapel on nearby Brownhill Road. Construction started in August 1900 and the 120-capacity building of local red brick, which cost £400, opened three months later. It was extended in 1937; but by the mid-1950s it was too small, so it was sold in 1957 to fund a new church and became an Age Concern centre. It was registered for marriages between November 1933 and October 1957.	
Chandler's Ford United Reformed Church (More images)		Chandler's Ford; 50.986569°N 1.381457°W	United Reformed Church	–	In the late 1920s, a retired Congregational minister moved to Chandler's Ford. He started to hold services at his house, then helped to establish a permanent church. It was built on King's Road and opened on 17 October 1929; just over 12 months later it was registered for marriages. It is one of the only two places of worship ever designed by architect Herbert Collins. A postwar extension expanded its capacity, which was originally 300. The church closed on 3 September 2021.	
Crowdhill Wesleyan Methodist Chapel (More images)		Crowdhill, Fair Oak; 50.974938°N 1.302624°W	Methodist	–	The origins of this congregation may go back to 1797, but this building was registered for worship between May 1872 and March 1980. It was a stone and brick chapel with a capacity of 105.	
Church of the Resurrection (More images)		Eastleigh; 50.971226°N 1.351210°W	Anglican	II	The church was partly funded by Charlotte Yonge and was built in three stages by three nationally renowned architects: the original nave, chancel and transept by George Edmund Street in 1868–69; vestry, aisle and second transept by John Loughborough Pearson in 1883–85; and a substantial extension by Arthur Blomfield between 1899 and 1905, creating a new chancel, nave and aisle. Plymouth and Bath stone were used to build all three parts. The ensemble is harmonious and "pleasantly proportioned". The church was consecrated on 29 April 1905 and was the town's parish church until it closed in 1978 and was declared redundant in November 1981, whereupon All Saints became the parish church. A "disastrous" fire in 1985 destroyed the roof, and the building stood empty until 2004 when it was converted into flats.	
Eastleigh Methodist Church (More images)		Eastleigh; 50.969525°N 1.355971°W	Methodist	–	Built in 1904 to serve the United Methodist Church, this brick chapel could hold 270 worshippers. It was used until 1959, when it was sold and converted into a Masonic hall.	
Gospel Hall (More images)		Eastleigh; 50.968790°N 1.353666°W	Open Brethren	–	Now used as a restaurant, this building on Eastleigh High Street was registered between May 1927 and January 1968 but had been built in 1887.	
Brethren Meeting Room (More images)		Eastleigh; 50.972312°N 1.354501°W	Plymouth Brethren	–	Northlands Road Meeting Room dates from 1908 and was used for over a century: permission to convert it into a house was granted in 2013.	
Salvation Army Hall (More images)		Eastleigh; 50.968183°N 1.353744°W	Salvation Army	–	Eastleigh had a Salvation Army presence on the High Street for over 100 years. This hall, which is now Eastleigh Museum, opened on 16 June 1887 and was registered for marriages in October 1932. It remained in religious use until the new, larger citadel was completed and opened in 1991.	
Salvation Army Barracks (More images)		Fair Oak; 50.963902°N 1.297216°W	Salvation Army	–	This was built as a Salvation Army hall in 1896, but the cause declined rapidly and it fell out of religious use in 1900. After a period of use as a working men's club from 1902, the building became derelict, but it was acquired by a local Scout troop in the 1960s and converted into their headquarters.	
Hedge End United Reformed Church (More images)		Hedge End; 50.912462°N 1.304432°W	United Reformed Church	–	A Congregational mission hall was established in a tin tabernacle on Northam Road in Hedge End in 1909, opening on 10 March of that year. It joined the United Reformed Church and remained in use until 1985, when the present building nearby replaced it. Latterly the church, which closed at the end of 2023, was linked to the United Reformed church in Bitterne in Southampton.	
Netley Methodist Church (More images)		Netley; 50.874805°N 1.353257°W	Methodist	–	The church was originally registered as Netley Mission Hall in 1888. It closed in 2011 (its registration was cancelled in November of that year) and has been proposed for demolition and replacement with housing. It was a brick chapel with a capacity of 100.	

== Demolished places of worship ==
Former places of worship
Name	Image	Location	Denomination/ Affiliation	Grade	Notes	Refs
Brethren Meeting Room (More images)		Hedge End; 50.911201°N 1.306725°W	Plymouth Brethren Christian Church	–	This meeting room has been superseded by the larger premises on St John's Road nearby and has been demolished. The planning application submitted in 2016 for its demolition and replacement with housing stated that it was built in 1963 for a congregation of Brethren who had worshipped in the Hedge End area since 1900, initially in houses and then at another meeting room which was demolished in the early 1960s. It was registered in February 1964.	

== Bibliography ==
- Bowie, Gavin G.S. (1986). Eastleigh, Bishopstoke and Chandlers Ford in Old Picture Postcards. Zaltbommel: European Library. ISBN 9-0288-3338-2.
- Chambers, Ralph (1952). The Strict Baptist Chapels of England: The Chapels of Surrey and Hampshire. Vol. 1. Thornton Heath: Ralph Chambers.
- Cox, Gordon Daubney (1996). Eastleigh. The Archive Photographs Series. Chalford: The Chalford Publishing Company. ISBN 0-7524-0636-1.
- Diocese of Portsmouth (December 1959). Portsmouth Diocesan Yearbook 1960 (12th ed.). Winchester: Donald S. Martell Ltd.
- Diocese of Portsmouth (1987). Diocese of Portsmouth Yearbook 1987. Portsmouth: Portsmouth Diocesan Information Office.
- Drewitt, Arthur (1935). Eastleigh's Yesterdays. Eastleigh: The Eastleigh Printing Works.
- Dwyer, Gerard (1981). Diocese of Portsmouth – Past and Present. Portsmouth: Portsmouth Diocesan Centenary Committee.
- Eastleigh Borough Council (June 2018). Eastleigh Borough Local Plan 2016–2036: Demography Background Paper (PDF) (Report). Eastleigh: Eastleigh Borough Council. Archived (PDF) from the original on 31 May 2020.
- Facey, Roy A., ed. (1981). International Church Index (Doctrinal). Index Publications. ISBN 0-907578-00-4.
- Hill, Roy (2002) [1990]. The Assemblies Address Book (PDF) (5th ed.). Bristol: Christian Year Publications. ISBN 1-872734-25-1. Archived from the original (PDF) on 19 September 2004.
- Hillier, Barbara J. (1984). The Story of Chandler's Ford. Southampton: Paul Cave Publications. ISBN 0-86146-052-9.
- Kelly, Bernard W. (1907). Historical Notes on English Catholic Missions (PDF). London: Kegan Paul, Trench, Trübner & Co.
- Lloyd, David W. (1974). Buildings of Portsmouth and its Environs: A survey of the dockyard, defences, homes, churches, commercial, civic and public buildings. Portsmouth: City of Portsmouth. ISBN 0-901559-53-9.
- McAuley, Fr James (16 July 2016). The Diocese of Portsmouth Parish Boundaries 2016 (PDF) (Report). Portsmouth: Roman Catholic Diocese of Portsmouth. Archived (PDF) from the original on 16 May 2017.
- Methodist Church of Great Britain (1947). Methodist Church Buildings: Statistical Returns including Seating Accommodation as at July 1st, 1940 (PDF). Manchester: The Department for Chapel Affairs. (Available online in 14 parts; Guide to abbreviations on page 6)
- O'Brien, Charles; Bailey, Bruce; Pevsner, Nikolaus; Lloyd, David W. (2018). Hampshire: South. The Buildings of England. London: Yale University Press. ISBN 978-0-300-22503-7.
- Page, William (1908). "A History of the County of Hampshire: Volume 3. Parishes: Bishopstoke". Victoria County History of Hampshire. British History Online.
- Stell, Christopher (1991). Inventory of Nonconformist Chapels and Meeting-Houses in South-West England. London: Royal Commission on the Historical Monuments of England. ISBN 0-117011-81-9.
- United Reformed Church (2022). Book of Reports 2022 (PDF). London: The United Reformed Church. Archived (PDF) from the original on 23 October 2022.
- United Reformed Church (2024). Record of Assembly 2024 (PDF). London: The United Reformed Church.
