= Fair Oak and Horton Heath =

Civil parish in Eastleigh, Hampshire, England

Coordinates: 50.9652°N 1.2998°W

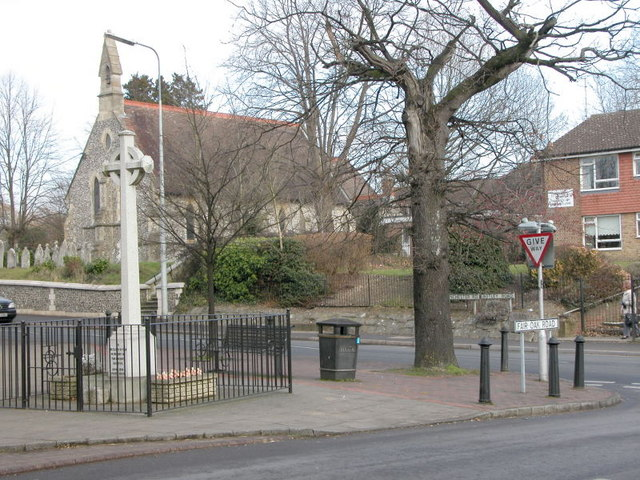
- Fair Oak War Memorial

- Location within Hampshire
- Population: 10,212 (2011 census)
- District: Eastleigh
- Shire county: Hampshire
- Region: South East
- Country: England
- Sovereign state: United Kingdom
- Police: Hampshire and Isle of Wight
- Fire: Hampshire and Isle of Wight
- Ambulance: South Central

Fair Oak and Horton Heath is a civil parish within the Borough of Eastleigh in Hampshire, England. The parish contains the villages of Fair Oak and Horton Heath. In 2011 it had a population of 10,212.

== History ==
On 28 July 1983 it was renamed from "Fair Oak" to "Fair Oak and Horton Heath".

== Fair Oak ==
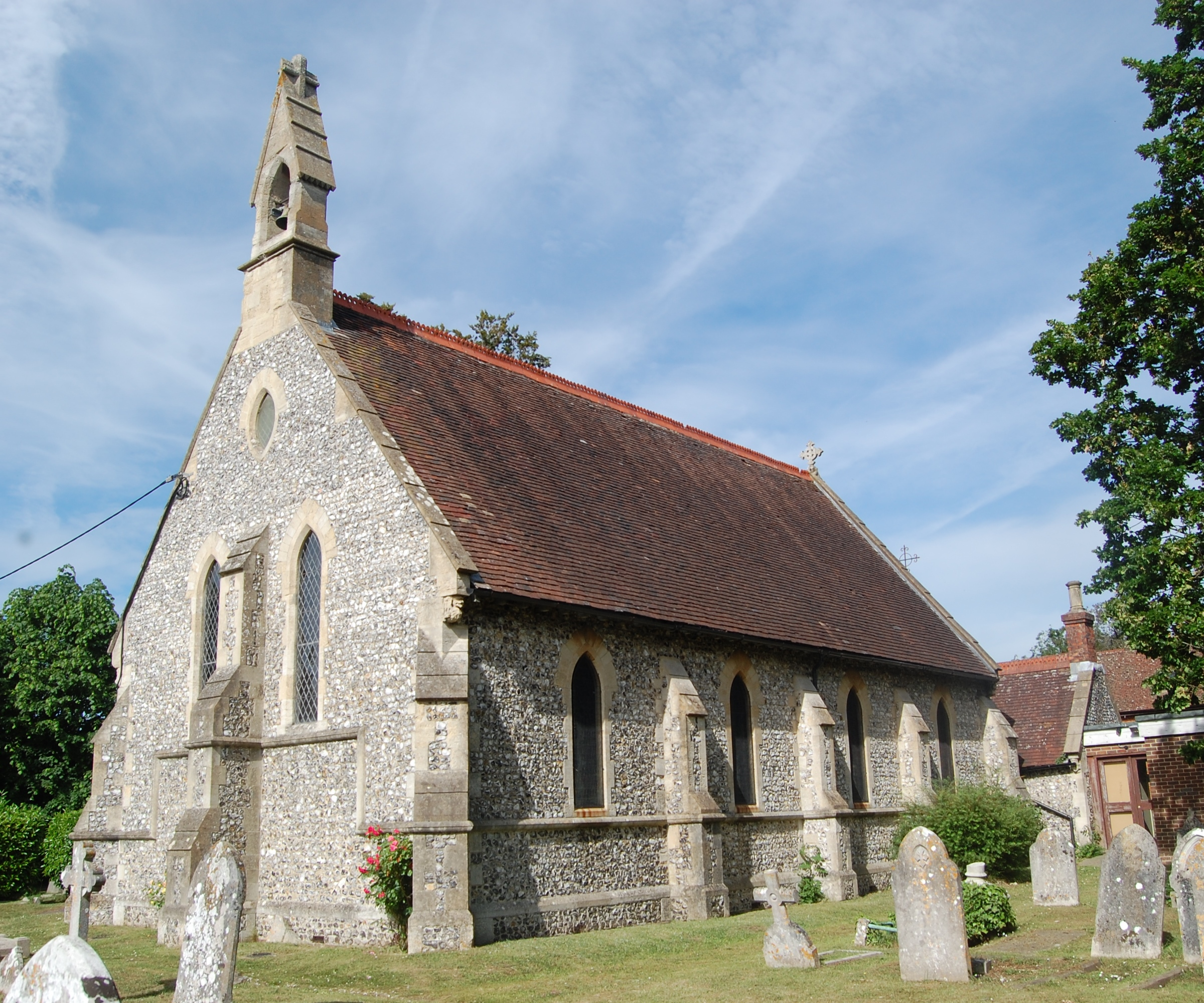
St Thomas's Church

Fair Oak is a large village to the east of the town of Eastleigh in Hampshire, England. Together with the village of Horton Heath, which lies to the south, it is part of the civil parish of Fair Oak and Horton Heath.

== Horton Heath ==
Horton Heath is a semi-rural village which forms part of the civil parish of Fair Oak and Horton Heath in the borough of Eastleigh in Hampshire, England. The village is about three miles southeast of Eastleigh town centre, and adjoins the village of Fair Oak.

The village greatly expanded during the late 1980s and 1990s, with developments such as The Drove and Meadowsweet way. A new village hall was also built at this time.

In 2014 a further development was proposed and permission was eventually granted for 2500 homes to be constructed on a 310ha area situated to the south west of the original village. The development is meant to include a mix of housing, green spaces, commercial premises and sports and leisure facilities.

It forms part of the Southampton Urban Area.

The current councillor is Michelle Marsh, who represents the Liberal Democrat party in the Fair Oak & Horton Heath ward. Marsh gained local notoriety for standing up against local felling.

The village has two pubs, 'The Brigadier Gerard' and 'The Lapstone'.
