= Wyvern College, Eastleigh =

Wyvern College

Location
- Botley Road; Eastleigh, Hampshire, SO50 7AN; England
- Coordinates: 50.960°N 1.298°W

Information
- Type: Academy
- Established: 1958
- Department for Education URN: 138184 Tables
- Head teacher: Ben Rule
- Gender: Coeducational
- Age: 11 to 16
- Website: http://www.wyvern.hants.sch.uk/

Wyvern College is a coeducational secondary school with academy status for students in the villages of Fair Oak, Bishopstoke, Horton Heath, Upham and Durley in southern Hampshire. The college is for students aged 11–16 and post-16 students go on to local sixth form colleges such as Barton Peveril and Eastleigh College, which are located in the neighbouring town of Eastleigh. It currently has over 1300 students, 95 teaching staff and 80 support staff.

== History ==
The original village school in Fair Oak at Fair Oak Court catered for pupils aged 5 to 14. In 1935 a new school was built on the Infants School site, and pupils continued at this school until 1958 when it was decided that the 248 pupils should attend a newly created secondary school in Eastleigh. They were joined by Bishopstoke pupils as other Eastleigh secondary schools were overcrowded. As the school was now sited outside its catchment area, all pupils had to travel to and from by bus.

Originally, the new school was known as the Eastleigh Secondary School, but within a year the new Headmaster, Robert Blachford, chose the distinctive name of Wyvern with the motto "Advance". This heraldic dragon has been connected with Wessex since Tudor times and formed the crest of Sir Francis Drake; it also featured on the badge of Blachford's Wessex regiment. However, accommodation became a problem at the Wyvern County Secondary School, and in 1966 the Wyvern arose again at Fair Oak, in the centre of the catchment area which also included the villages of Colden Common, Durley, Horton Heath and Upham. The number on roll had risen to 750.

The new school buildings, designed for 450 pupils, were not large enough and the old school in Eastleigh became known as "the Annexe", with a whole year group being bused to and fro each day. The school leaving age was increased to 16, new courses were introduced and Fair Oak became an increasingly popular residential area. By 1976 the school roll was 1200 and the teaching staff had increased from 10 to 60. However, it was in 1978 before there was sufficient accommodation and "the Annexe" was no longer needed.

Subsequently, throughout the 80's and 90's, all departments were gradually enlarged and suited to facilitate the delivery of the changing curricula. In 1985, the then headmaster George Davies achieved community status for the school. Information Technology then developed rapidly and started to form an integral part of every student's learning experiences and in September 2000, the school was awarded specialist school status and became Wyvern Technology College. The college converted to an academy in June 2012, changing its name to Wyvern College at the same time.

Wyvern College has been credited in the past with several national achievements in music, drama and art such the Music for Youth semi-final place earned by the Wyvern Soul Band in July 2015.

== Notable former pupils ==
- Graham Noyce - 1979 FIM Motocross World Champion
