= William Gilbert (author) =

English writer, surgeon, and father of dramatist W. S. Gilbert (1804-1890)

William Gilbert (20 May 1804 – 3 January 1890) was an English writer and Royal Navy surgeon. He wrote a considerable number of novels, biographies, histories, essays (especially about the dangers of alcohol and the plight of the poor) and popular fantasy stories, mostly in the 1860s and 1870s. Some of these have been reprinted in recent decades and are still available today. He is best remembered, however, as the father of dramatist W. S. Gilbert of Gilbert and Sullivan.

== Life and career ==
Gilbert was born at Bishopstoke, Hampshire, the eldest son of William (1780–1812), a grocer in Commercial Row, Blackfriars, London, and his wife Sarah née Mathers (1782–1810). Both his parents died of tuberculosis by the time William was seven years old, and thereafter, he and his younger siblings, Joseph and Jane, were raised in London by their mother's sister and her husband, Mary née Mathers (1770–1865) and John Samuel Schwenck (1780–1861), a childless and financially comfortable couple. Gilbert's father had also left the children legacies that would be invested by their uncle until the youngest had reached age 21, so Gilbert's would not be due to him until age 26. With the three young Gilbert children, the Schwencks soon moved from Lambeth to a larger house in Clapham, where they raised the children with affection.

Gilbert served the East India Company as a midshipman from 1818 (age 14) to 1821 but was unhappy with the conditions, and so he quit the service. He then spent several years in Italy, returning to England about 1825. There he studied at Guy's Hospital and served as an assistant surgeon in the navy, and then he entered the Royal College of Surgeons in 1830. At this time, he received his annuity from his father's estate, giving him financial independence, and also published a volume of his poetry. He first married Mary Ann Skelton in 1832, who died two years later at around age 20. By this time, he had privately published another book, but after the death of his wife, he published no more for many years. He married Anne Mary Bye Morris (1811–1888), age 24, on 14 February 1836. She was the daughter of Thomas Morris (1760–1849), an apothecary, and Christiana nee Sutherland (1777–1845). The couple's famous son, W. S. Gilbert, was born on 18 November 1836 at the Morris's house in Southampton Street. The Gilberts then moved to Hammersmith, near Anne's sister Harriet and her family.

In 1838, Gilbert took his wife and toddler on a long trip to Italy, where he had lived as a young man. There, their daughter Jane Morris Gilbert (1838–1906) was born. In 1841, Gilbert's brother and sister, Joseph and Jane, both died of tuberculosis. Gilbert received some property owned by his sister and became a potential co-guardian to Joseph's two young sons, together with the Schwencks. In 1843, his daughter Mary Florence (1843–1911) was born. In early 1845, Gilbert decided to take custody of his two young nephews from their mother, Catherine, who had begun a relationship with an officer of the East India Company. She brought a custody lawsuit and her children were returned to her. Amid considerable publicity critical of Gilbert and the Schwencks, Gilbert fled with his young family to Boulogne, France, where his daughter, Anne Maude (1845–1932), was born. The family lived there for two years and returned to London in 1847, moving to Brompton.

Gilbert and Anne "led an increasingly quarrelsome life" in London.

=== Early writing career ===
Gilbert began his writing career around 1857. He was concerned, throughout his life, with the welfare of the poor and served as honorary secretary of the Society of the Relief of Distress. His interest in the poor is evident in his writing, and one of his recurring themes was that poverty and alcohol, not genealogy, was the major cause of crime and the main factor in one's later fortunes. This theme would also be seen in his son's writing. One of the elder Gilbert's first pieces was a pamphlet entitled, "On the Present System of Rating for the Relief of the Poor in the Metropolis" (1857). In 1858, anonymously, Gilbert published Dives and Lazarus, or the adventures of an obscure medical man in a low neighbourhood. The book was a fictional account focusing on what Gilbert saw as the increasing disparity in the lives of the rich and the poor. A similar theme pervades another early Gilbert novel, The Weaver's Family (1860). This theme continued to concern Gilbert throughout his career including in Contrasts; dedicated to the ratepayers of London (1873) and in one of his fiercest attacks on social abuses, The City; An Inquiry into the Corporation, its livery companies, and the administration of their charities and endowments (1877), describing how 50,000 working-class people were evicted from their dwellings to make room for the Metropolitan Railway. In an age of male chauvinism, Gilbert also wrote several articles about discrimination against women.

In 1859, Gilbert published a novel, Margaret Meadows, A Tale for the Pharisees. This was made into a play called Mary Warner by Tom Taylor in 1869, who was forced to pay Gilbert a settlement for plagiarising his novel. Gilbert's most successful early novel was Shirley Hall Asylum: Or the Memoirs of a Monomaniac (1863), which told the stories of inmates of a lunatic asylum from the point of view of an escapee driven mad by trying to solve the problem of perpetual motion. Gilbert's first novel published under his own name was Christmas Tale: The Rosary, a Legend of Wilton Abbey (1863). The story purports to be the written confession of one Alicia Longspée, who had been Lady Abbess of the Benedictine Convent at Wilton in the 15th century. Gilbert's next novel, De Profundis, a tale of the social deposits (1864) is the story of a foundling rescued by a Scottish Fusilier Guardsman stationed in London. The foundling grows up to marry the guardsman's daughter. Another 1864 book was The Goldsworthy Family, or the country attorney, about an unethical lawyer.

Gilbert's 1865 book, The Magic Mirror (about a mirror that grants wishes), containing stories with a moral was illustrated by his multi-talented son. Gilbert also wrote histories and articles and stories for numerous periodicals (often anonymously), including Cornhill, Temple Bar, St. Paul's, The Quiver, The Contemporary Review, The Sunday Magazine, Good Things, Good Words, Strahan's Boy's and Girl's (sic) Annual and The Fortnightly Review.

Among Gilbert's best-known, and most popular, works were his Innominato tales of the supernatural, published in various magazines, including Argosy, and finally collected in The Wizard of the Mountain (1867). One of the best-known is "The Last Lords of Gardonal" (1867). These stories concerned the adventures of an enigmatic wizard and astrologer called the Innominato (in English, "Nameless"), in 14th century Italy, who tried to use his powers to help people.

=== Later years ===
In 1868, Gilbert wrote The Doctor of Beauweir, an autobiography, told from the point of view of a South Wales medic. King George's Middy (1869), also illustrated by W. S. Gilbert, relates the adventures of a Leicestershire squire's son who becomes a midshipman and is marooned of the coast of Africa. Another 1869 novel was Sir Thomas Branston. Later that year, Gilbert produced his most famous biography, Lucrezia Borgia, Duchess of Ferrara: a biography: Illustrated by rare and unpublished documents. In this work, Gilbert concluded, after extensive research, that there was no evidence of the acts of gross immorality of which Borgia was accused, including murder. This was followed in 1870 by The Inquisitor, or the Struggle in Ferrara, about the life of Renée of France, Duchess of Ferrara, set in 1554.

In 1871, the novel Martha was followed by The Landlord of the "Sun", again describing a descent into degradation, this time involving a villainous seducer, an illegitimate child and drunkenness, and, in 1873, by Clara Levesque. Another theme that was seen in Gilbert's writings was his dislike of established religion and the Roman Catholic Church in particular. Two works on this theme included Facta non-Verba: a comparison between the good works performed by the ladies in Roman Catholic convents in England, and the unfettered efforts of their Protestant sisters (1874) and Disestablishment from a Church point of view (1875).

Gilbert had a mercurial temper and was difficult to live with, imposing arbitrary restrictions on his wife and daughters. After many years of strained relations with his wife, Gilbert left home and separated from her in 1876 after forty years of marriage. He left his wife and daughters substantial incomes and the family home, assuming that he would be able to earn a good living from his writing. However, he soon became seriously ill and appeared to be dying, and his doctors advised him not to write. His wife did not assist in his care and did not, ultimately, allow him to return home. Her son appealed to her on his father's behalf, but she would not change her mind. W. S. Gilbert apparently never contacted his mother again. Instead, Gilbert went to live with Jane, his only married daughter, and her husband in The Close at Salisbury Cathedral, where he resided for the rest of his life.

In 1877, Gilbert published Them Boots, another description of characters from the lowest class of society, as well as The City. Pursuing another favourite theme, the dangers of drink, Gilbert also published in 1877 Nothing but the Truth, an unvarnished picture of the effects of intemperance, and example of his many writings about the dangers of alcohol. 1879 saw the publication of Mrs. Dubosq's Bible, about a French Huguenot group in Spitalfields in the 18th century, and the possession of a 1650 Geneva Bible by a poor person. In 1880, Memoirs of a Cynic was a protest against cruelty and hypocrisy. This was followed in 1881 by Modern Wonders of the World, or the new Sinbad, a series of 10 stories told to London children by Hassan, the son of an Egyptian slave dealer. His last book, published in 1882, Legion, or the modern demoniac, returns to Gilbert's campaign against drink, which, he illustrated, leads to "crime, profligacy, suicide, homicide, brutality, cruelty, pauperism, idiocy and insanity."

Gilbert died at the age of 86 and was buried in The Close at Salisbury.

== Works ==
=== Novels and collections ===
- Dives and Lazarus; or, The Adventures of an Obscure Medical Man in a Low Neighbourhood (1858)
- Margaret Meadows, A Tale for the Pharisees (1858)
- The Weaver's Family (1860)
- Shirley Hall Asylum; or, The Memoirs of a Monomaniac (1863)
- The Rosary, A Legend of Wilton Abbey (1863)
- De Profundis, a Tale of the Social Deposits (1864)
- The Goldsworthy Family; or, The Country Attorney (1864)
- Doctor Austin's Guests (1866) (sequel to Shirley Hall Asylum)
- The Magic Mirror: A Round of Tales for Young and Old (1865; illustrated by W. S. Gilbert)
- The Doctor of Beauweir, An Autobiography (1868)
- The Seven League Boots (1869; illustrated by W. S. Gilbert)
- King George’s Middy (1869; illustrated by W. S. Gilbert)
- Sir Thomas Branston (1869)
- Martha (1871)
- The Landlord of the "Sun" (1871)
- Clara Levesque (1873)
- Them Boots (1877)
- James Duke, Costermonge, A Tale of the Social Aspects (c. 1879)
- Mrs. Dubosq's Bible (1879)
- Memoirs of a Cynic (1880)
- Modern Wonders of the World; or, the New Sinbad (1881)

=== Short stories ===
- "A Visit to a Convict Lunatic Asylum" (1864)
- "The Sacristan of St. Botolph" (1866)
- "Ruth Thornbury; or, The Old Maid's Story" (1866)
- "The Doctor Onofrio" (1867) *
- "Fra Gerolamo" (1867) *
- "The Magic Flower" (1867) *
- "The Last Lords of Gardonal" (1867) *
- "Tomas and Pepina" (1867) *
- "The Robber Chief" (1867) *
- "Don Bucefalo and the Curate" (1867) **
- "The Physician's Daughter" (1867) **
- "The Two Lovers" (1867) **
- "The Stranger" (1867) **
- "The Innominato's Confession" (1867) **
- "Friar Peter’s Confession" (1869)
- "How Brother Ignatius Became a Monk" (1869)
- "How Brother Jonas, the Sub-Cellarer, was Haunted by an Evil Spirit" (1869)
- "The Seven League Boots" (1869; illustrated by W. S. Gilbert)
- "The Shrine of Santa Clara" (1869)
- "Walter, the Sub-Steward" (1869)
- "The Invisible Prince" (1872)
- "The Abuse of Charity in London: the Case of the Five Royal Hospitals" (1878)
- "The London Medical Schools" (1879)

Note:
* denotes a story collected in The Wizard of the Mountain (volume 1)
** denotes a story collected in The Wizard of the Mountain (volume 2)
