= Bishopstoke =

Village and parish in Hampshire, England

Coordinates: 50.9679°N 1.3278°W

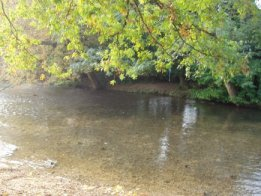
- Bishopstoke gravel beach (pictured) which is created by fluctuations in the height of the River Itchen

- Location within Hampshire
- Population: 9,974 (2011 Census)
- OS grid reference: SU472189
- District: Eastleigh
- Shire county: Hampshire
- Region: South East
- Country: England
- Sovereign state: United Kingdom
- Post town: Eastleigh
- Postcode district: SO50
- Dialling code: 023
- Police: Hampshire and Isle of Wight
- Fire: Hampshire and Isle of Wight
- Ambulance: South Central
- UK Parliament: Eastleigh

Bishopstoke is a village and civil parish in the Eastleigh district of Hampshire, England. It is recorded as "Stoke" as early as 948 AD when King Eadred granted land there to a thegn called Aelfric. Stoke later came into the possession of the Bishops of Winchester, giving rise to the modern name. The village is about a mile east of Eastleigh town centre, and is on the eastern bank of the River Itchen. It adjoins Fair Oak on the east.

The parish of Bishopstoke was annexed to Eastleigh in 1899. It was later re-established as a parish in 1995. The village forms part of the South Hampshire urban area.

== History ==
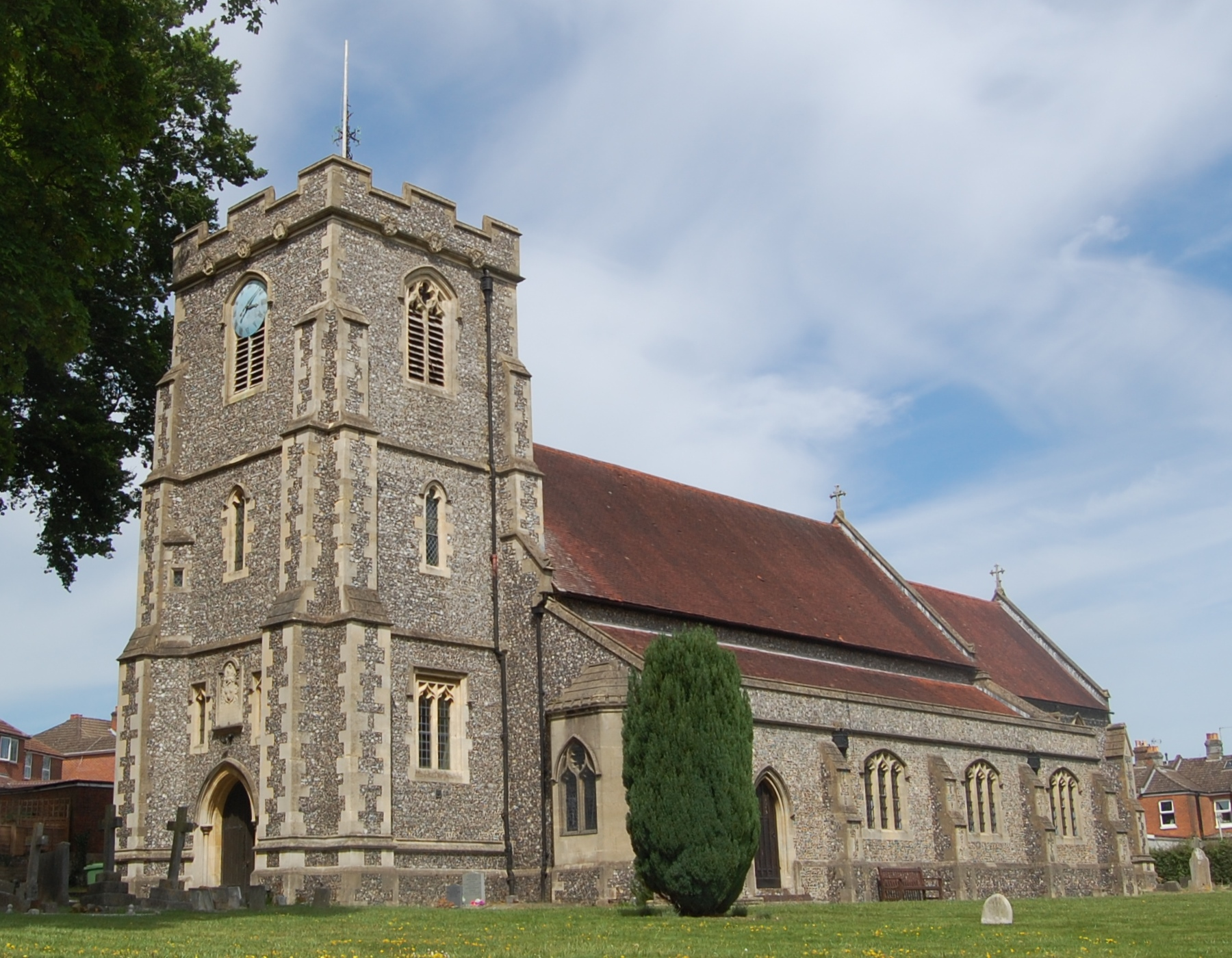
St Mary's Church: parish church built 1891 replacing earlier building.

The first mention of Bishopstoke comes in 948 AD as Stoke, when land there was given by King Eadred (grandson of Alfred the Great) to Aelfric, a thegn. The village is recorded in the Domesday Book of 1086.

The Itchen Navigation canal between Winchester and Southampton was completed in 1710 and in use until 1869. Much of it runs through Bishopstoke, including a sluice in use until the closure.

When the London and Southampton Railway was built in 1839 it passed 1 mile (1.6 km) to the west of the village. Bishopstoke railway station was built to serve the area. The town of Eastleigh grew around the station, which changed its name to "Eastleigh and Bishopstoke" in 1889 and then just "Eastleigh" in 1923, reflecting the growing importance of Eastleigh relative to its older neighbour of Bishopstoke.

== Governance ==
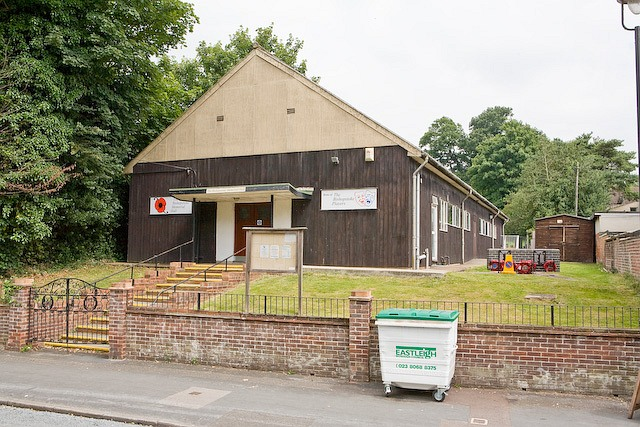
Memorial Hall, Riverside

There are three tiers of local government covering Bishopstoke, at parish, district and county level: Bishopstoke Parish Council, Eastleigh Borough Council and Hampshire County Council. The parish council has an office at the Memorial Hall on Riverside.

=== Administrative history ===
Bishopstoke was an ancient parish. When elected parish councils were established in 1894 it was decided to split the parish in two, with the eastern part becoming a parish called Fair Oak. The reduced Bishopstoke parish was divided further in 1899; the more rural northern part became a parish called Stoke Park, and the remaining parish of Bishopstoke was added to the urban district of Eastleigh, which was renamed "Eastleigh and Bishopstoke" at the same time. After 1899 Bishopstoke was therefore an urban parish with no parish council, being directly administered by the urban district council. The parish was abolished in 1932 to become part of the parish of Eastleigh, at which point the urban district was also renamed back to just Eastleigh. The Stoke Park parish was abolished at the same time, being split between Eastleigh and Fair Oak.

Bishopstoke was re-established as a civil parish in 1995.

== Stoke Park Woods ==
Bordering the village to the North and comprising about 207 ha (512 acres), the Stoke Park area contains 61 per cent woodland and 39 per cent arable. Its many plant species include rare quaking grass. Originally these woods were owned by the Bishop of Winchester. King John of England hunted them in 1205. In 1540 they were licensed by King Henry VIII as a fenced deer hunt.

The woods were bought by the Forestry Commission in 1948 and are now community woodland managed by Forestry England to produce wood for paper pulp and timber. Local groups have been set up to fight council plans for a new housing development, that they argue, would destroy the inter-woodland countryside and significantly damage the ancient woodland around Stoke Park, including Upper Barn, Crowdhill copses, Bishopstoke and Fair Oak Local Green Space.

Popular sites include the Eastleigh Falls, a semi-natural rapidly flowing chalk stream that supports a variety of locally rare plant and animal species. The site has been recognised as important habitat for the northern crested newt (Triturus cristatus). There are ongoing efforts by local activists to classify the area as a Site of Special Scientific Interest to ensure its protection from the proposed development projects.

== Today ==
Bishopstoke contains one infant school, Stoke Park Infant School, and one Junior School, Stoke Park Junior School. which feeds the secondary school in Fair Oak, Wyvern College. The village has a Girl Guide group off West Drive, including Rainbow, Brownie and Guide units. It is also home to both the 13th Eastleigh Scouts in St Paul's Church and 12th Eastleigh Scouts on West Drive. Eastleigh's museum in the High Street, which is open from Tuesday to Saturday, holds several files containing information about Bishopstoke's historic past and associated personalities, such as John Bale, Samuel Sewall, and Dean Garnier.

Bishopstoke still retains many buildings dating from the 18th century, although the village is expanding and now has a number of newer built residential and commercial premises. It has effectively become divided into Old Bishopstoke and New Bishopstoke, heading roughly west to east, reflecting the recent housing requirements within the area.

There are four churches in the village: St Mary's and St Paul's, both Church of England, Bishopstoke Evangelical Church in Stoke Park Road, and Bishopstoke Methodist Church in Sedgwick Road.

== Farm land ==
Eastleigh Borough Council has been purchasing farmland in order to protect against climate change and increase diversity.

== Notable people ==
Among those born or resident in Bishopstoke have been:

- Richard Dummer (1589–1679), early settler in New England described as "one of the fathers of Massachusetts"
- Edith Escombe (1866–1950), fiction writer and essayist
- William Gilbert (1804–1890), novelist and Royal Navy surgeon, father of dramatist W. S. Gilbert
- Henry Hamilton Bailey (1894–1961), influential author of surgical textbooks.
- Samuel Sewall (1652–1730), Massachusetts judge, best known for involvement in the Salem witch trials
- Anna Sabine (British politician)

== See also ==
- List of places of worship in the Borough of Eastleigh
