= Fair Oak Lodge =

Coordinates: 50.958°N 1.295°W

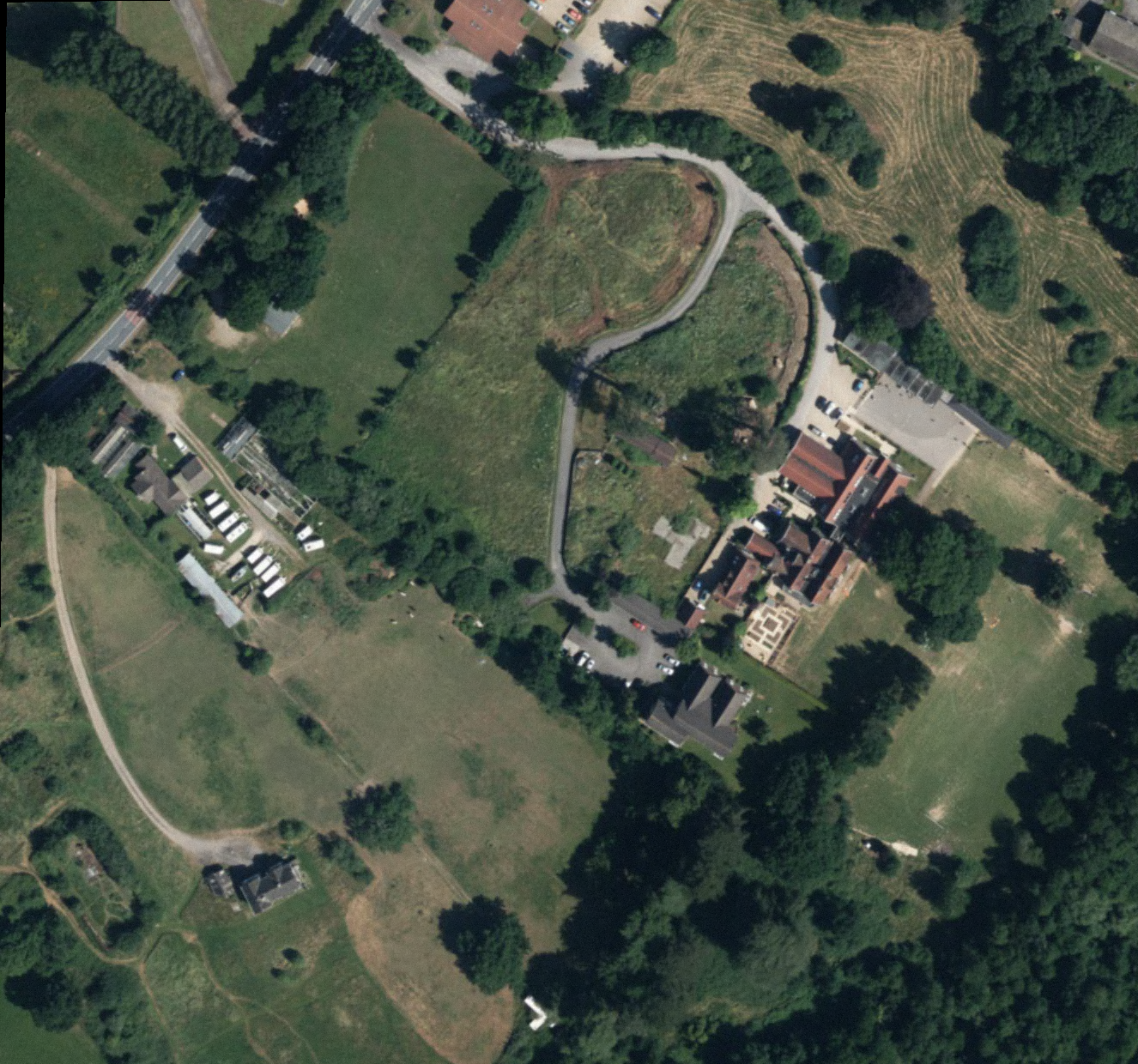
Aerial photograph of Fair Oak Lodge, with St Swithun's Church to the north (top of picture) and the new house (also called Fair Oak Lodge) to the southwest. The lodge on Allington Lane is just out of the picture, to the north of the church.

Fair Oak Lodge, sometimes referred to as Lakesmere House, is a former country house in the village of Fair Oak, Hampshire. Much of the original estate has been built upon with modern housing, but the house itself survives and is owned by the Hampshire Christian Education Trust, who operate the King's School from the building. The two entrance lodges to the property also still survive as do some of the woodland, ponds and specimen trees that formed part of the estate.

== History ==
The land was part of the hunting grounds belonging to the Bishop of Winchester at the time of the Domesday Book. Being equidistant between Netley Abbey and Winchester, some historians have suggested it may have been occupied by a resting place or lodging house for monks travelling between the two locations in the 16th century, although there is no conclusive proof of this.

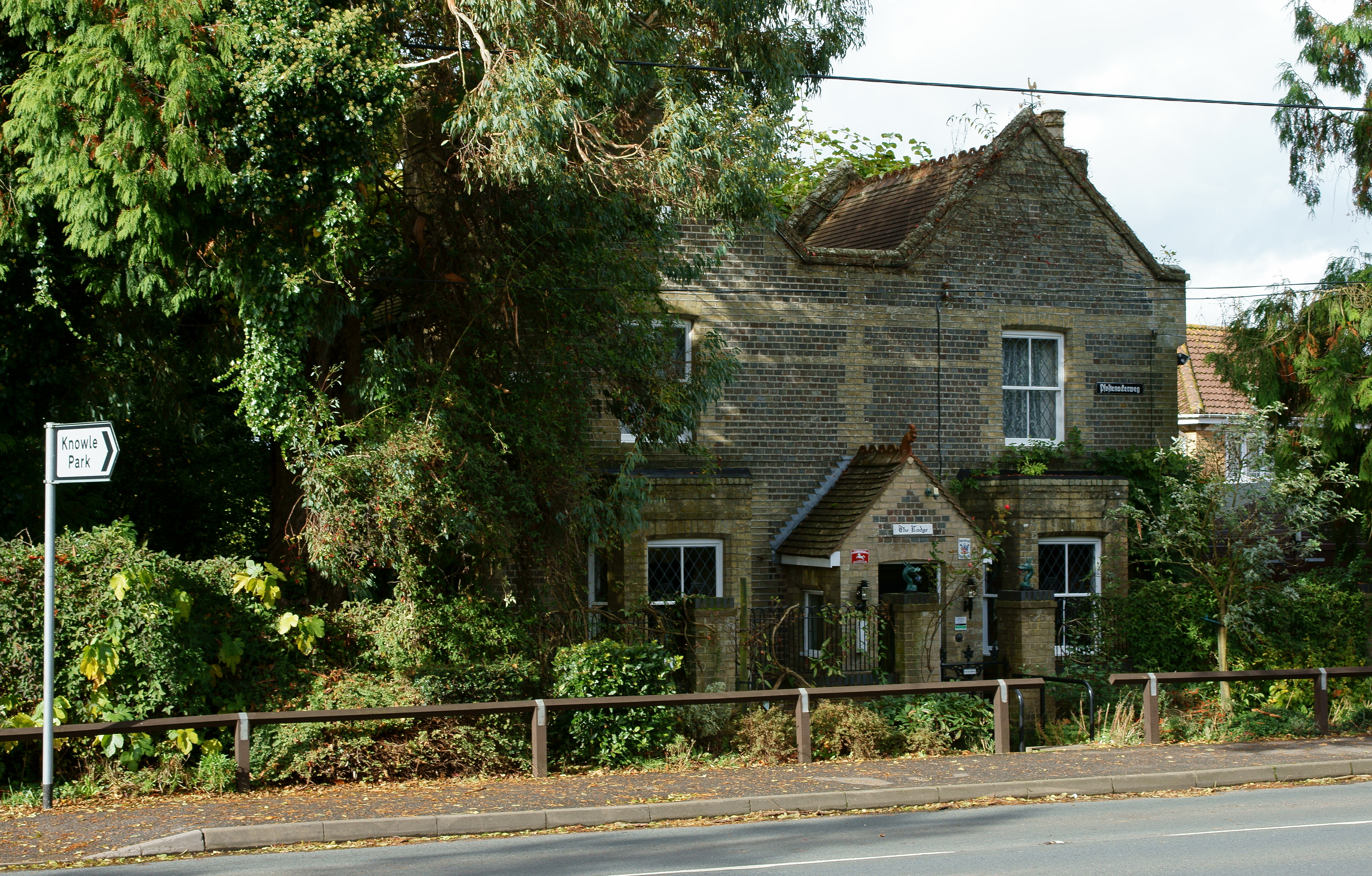
The eastern lodge on Botley Road

The 1810 Ordnance Survey map shows a building on the site named "New House", which was renamed Fair Oak Lodge by 1819. A further map in 1826 shows the house within a landscaped park, including carriage drives leading east and west from the house to Botley Road and Allington Lane respectively.

John Twynham occupied the house in 1842 and had the building extended. A number of alterations to the grounds also followed, and the property was shown on Ordnance Survey maps in the early 1870s as Oak Lodge. A conservatory had been added to the southern side of the house by 1870, followed by an aviary on the eastern side by 1896.

By the 1870s the garden was planted with a mixture of specimen trees and conifers, with an open terrace to the rear of the house which may have been used for lawn sports such as tennis or bowls. An avenue led southwards from the house to two lakes, named the Quobleigh Ponds, the water levels in each being controlled by separate sluices. Within the parkland were eight fenced areas containing two or three conifers each, and the estate's fields were bounded by trees.

Twenty years on many of the trees had been felled and a walled garden created to the west of the house, accompanied by four glasshouses. A turning circle had been added to the driveway in front of the house, and additional buildings around the Quobliegh Ponds: a boathouse on the northern side and a hide to the southeast. The avenue southwards from the house is not shown on maps from this era but some of the trees remained in place.

The Gillett family resided in the house in 1891 along with eight staff. In 1900 Mr Gillet's orchids won a silver gilt medal, but he died the same year and the house was put up for sale in 1901, described as a "sporting estate with fishing, shooting and golf". Sir Arthur Grant of Moneymusk, Mrs Gillet's brother-in-law, purchased the property and appealed for a rates reduction in 1903–4. In 1908 the estate, still owned by Grant, covered 120 acres (49 ha), including a 7 acres (2.8 ha) lake.

In 1924 the estate was owned by a Mr Wolff, who applied for permission to drain some land and make various other alterations. Wolff wrote to The Times in 1939 regarding eight cygnets that were hatching on the lake. Within two years the lakes were silting up considerably, with the Ordnance Survey map of 1941 showing the upper lake as a marshy area traversed by a stream as opposed to an open body of water, and the northeast part of the lower lake undertaking a similar transformation. A sundial was shown where the bird aviary had previously stood; the conservatory on the side of the house had gone, as had three of the four glasshouses.

Ownership of the estate changed again, with it being owned by the Morrogh Bernard family by 1954. Lt Colonel Morrogh Bernard attempted to sell the house and 55 acres (22 ha) of the estate in 1963. His advertisement in The Times read: "Main House built in 1842 on site of a much older house parts of which still form part of the present property, the grounds are a part of the Itchen valley and include a lake of 4 acres (1.6 ha) a market garden, pasture and woodland".

Morrogh Bernard built a new house on the land he retained, retaining the name Fair Oak Lodge for this new building. The original house was converted into a convent by the Roman Catholic Diocese of Clifton. By 1974 the driveway to Botley Road was gone, with the only driveway to the house linking to Allington Lane, and much of the land around the house laid to grass. To the west of the house were several large greenhouses and rows of saplings, together with an area of smaller plants behind the house and outbuildings.

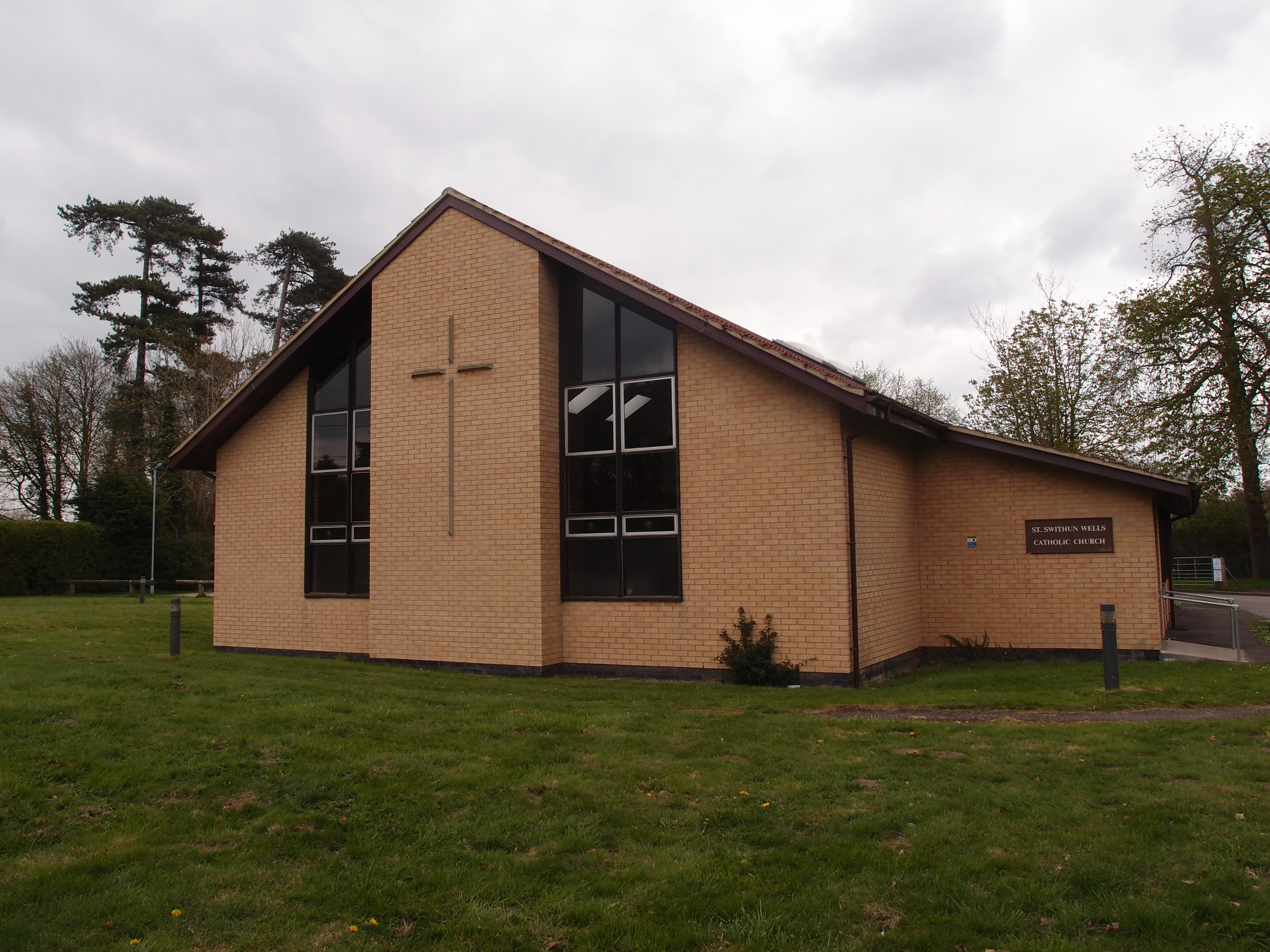
St Swithun Wells Roman Catholic Church

The Diocese built St Swithun Wells Church next to the lodge on the Allington Lane in the late 1970s and relocated the nuns to alternative accommodation, selling the house and some of the land to a development company called Lakesmere. Lakesmere extended the house and constructed Rockford House, a block of ten flats, within the walled gardens. Lakesmere sold the house and 3.5 acres (1.4 ha) of land to the King's School in 1987.

In 2018, Eastleigh Borough Council gave planning permission to Bargate Homes to demolish Morrogh Bernard's Fair Oak Lodge and construct 50 new houses on the site.

== The King's School ==
Having purchased Fair Oak Lodge from the Lakesmere development company, the school refer to the building as Lakesmere House instead of its original name. The school provides for pupils aged 4 to 16 and has a non-selective admissions policy. As of May 2025, the school had a capacity of 270 pupils, with 228 current students. Although Hampshire Christian Education Trust purchased Fair Oak Lodge in 1987, the school had operated in other premises before then, having opened in September 1982.
