= South Hampshire Plan =

Housing plan

The South Hampshire Plan was a co-ordinated housing plan instigated in the 1960s in the southern portion of the English county of Hampshire.

It was drawn up to encourage growth in the area between Southampton and Portsmouth, which would allow for the extra housing needed to cope with the economic growth in the region. The major areas that benefitted from the growth that followed were Fareham, Havant, Locks Heath and Gosport.
