= Edith Escombe =

English writer (1866–1950)

Edith Escombe (1866–1950) was an English writer of stories and essays born in Manchester. Several of her works concern marriage and the demands it makes on women. Two of her novellas were republished in 2010 and 2011 by the British Library. Her debut work was the memoir Bits I Remember (1892), which gives an entertaining account of her childhood and her education by governesses and in boarding school.

From 1902 until 1907, Escombe was a regular writer of the magazine The Parents' Review. A Monthly Magazine of Home-Training and Culture, covering aspects of child care and education such as "over-education", "natural growth" and "Christmas without children".

== Family ==
Edith Escombe was third in a family of six girls and two boys born to William Escombe (died 1882), a Manchester shipping and insurance agent, and his wife Eliza, née Fergusson. She later lived at Bishopstoke, near Eastleigh, Hampshire with her mother, who died in 1930, and her sisters. The family firm provided them with a comfortable living. The firm was later the subject of a short history: Full and Down: The History of Escombe, McGrath & Company Limited (1953) by William Malcolm Lingard Escombe.

== Works ==
Escombe's first book, the memoir Bits I Remember, published under the pseudonym "A Grown-Up" (1892), gives an entertaining account of her childhood and her education by governesses and in boarding school. Also humorous and subtle are some later novellas about women and marriage. A Tale that is Told (1893, republished by the British Library in 2010) and Stucco and Speculation (1894, likewise republished by the British Library in 2011) both involve experimental marriages. Two other novellas, Love's Ghost and Le Glaive, appeared in one volume in 1903.

Escombe's volume of essays, Old Maids' Children (1906), explores child-rearing from the viewpoint of an aunt. Phases of Marriage (1907) is expressly critical of marriage as an institution and what it can do to women who are insufficiently educated and independent for the role.

Escombe contributed regularly between 1902 and 1907 to The Parents' Review. A Monthly Magazine of Home-Training and Culture, covering aspects of child care and education such as "over-education", "natural growth" and "Christmas without children".
