= Fair Oak =

Village and parish in Hampshire, England

Coordinates: 50.966°N 1.299°W

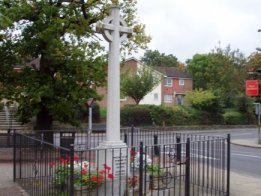
- Fair Oak War Memorial with the present 'fair oak' behind

- Location within Hampshire
- Population: 9,900 (parish); 10,212 (2011 Census)
- OS grid reference: SU493187
- Civil parish: Fair Oak and Horton Heath
- District: Eastleigh
- Shire county: Hampshire
- Region: South East
- Country: England
- Sovereign state: United Kingdom
- Post town: Eastleigh
- Postcode district: SO50
- Dialling code: 023
- Police: Hampshire and Isle of Wight
- Fire: Hampshire and Isle of Wight
- Ambulance: South Central
- UK Parliament: Eastleigh
- Website: Fair Oak and Horton Heath Parish Council

Fair Oak is a large village to the east of the town of Eastleigh in Hampshire, England. Together with the village of Horton Heath, which lies to the south, it is part of the civil parish of Fair Oak and Horton Heath.

== History ==
Fair Oak takes its name from a tree in the Square which was felled and replaced in February 1843. A fair took place under the tree in June every year until 1918, and local historians believe this provided the tree, and subsequently the village around it, with its name.

Documentary evidence exists of a settlement in the area called Cnolgette in 901 AD.

The village has a history of sand quarrying, with some of the newer parts built over old restored quarries. In November 1830, during the Swing Riots, a group of labourers destroyed threshing machines in and around the village.

The central church of St Thomas was originally built in 1863 to serve as a chapel of ease for Fair Oak cemetery. At this time the village was part of the parish of Bishopstoke with its church of St Mary.

Fair Oak was established as a civil parish in its own right in 1894, covering an area of 1,680 acres (680 ha) which previously formed the eastern end of Bishopstoke parish. In 1908, Fair Oak was described thus:

The village of Fair Oak consists of widely scattered houses and farms reaching from Crowdhill on the north to Horton Heath on the south. From Crowdhill, part of which is in Fair Oak, a fine view can be gained of the surrounding country, the Itchen valley stretching away to the south-west towards the Solent, and the chalk downs which lie round Winchester sweeping away to the north.

At this point Crowdhill consisted of a Wesleyan chapel and approximately three houses, with Stocks Farm lying between Crowdhill and the centre of Fair Oak itself, where St Thomas' Church had a number of houses grouped around it. An inn, smithy, and church schools were nearby, and some cottages adjoined the road to Knowle Hill. Horton Heath was included in the civil parish and at that time, consisting of a post office, the Rising Sun Inn, Hammerley Farm and a Union Chapel, was considered "a detached portion of Fair Oak village".

A number of country houses were sited around Fair Oak village. These included Fair Oak Park to the east, whose grounds covered about 120 acres (49 ha). To the northeast stood Stroudwood, while southwest of the village was Fair Oak Lodge, whose estate again covered about 120 acres (49 ha) and contained a lake known as Quobleigh Pond, which itself covered an area of about 7 acres (2.8 ha) and was noted for supporting a variety of water fowl species. Originally a convent dating from the 16th century, Fair Oak Lodge is in Allington Lane and was extended in the 19th century. The building now houses The King's School, which purchased the property in 1987.

Wyvern Community School was opened in 1965 and was renamed Wyvern Technology College in 2000. Then in 2012 the name was changed again to Wyvern College as a result of the school's conversion to an academy. The uniform crest was also changed slightly to a golden dragon.

The name of the parish was changed in 1983 from "Fair Oak" to "Fair Oak and Horton Heath" to reflect the expansion of the latter settlement over the previous two decades.

== Amenities ==
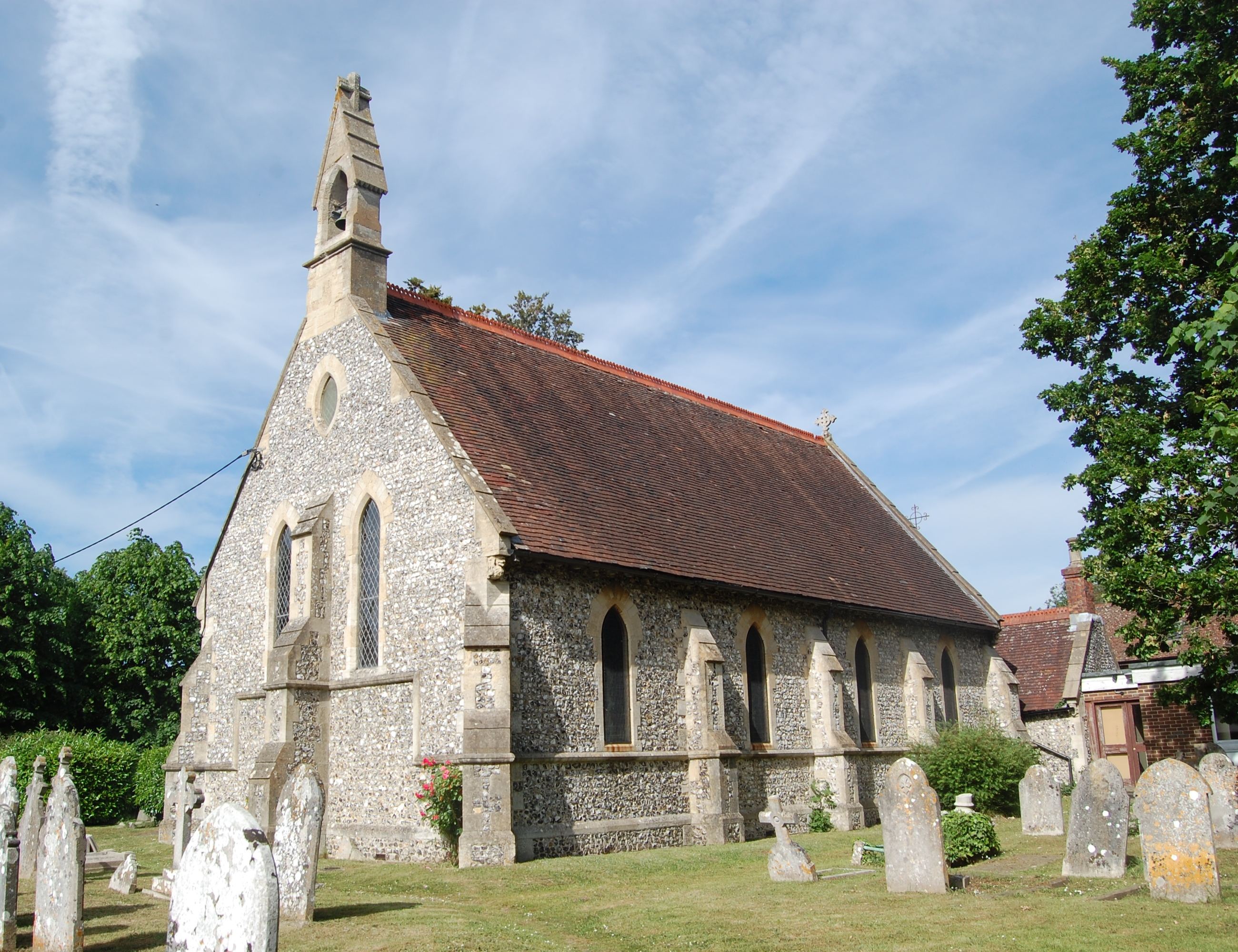
St Thomas's Church

The church, St.Thomas has been designated a beacon church for the Winchester diocese. The village has also been the location for Christian outreach programmes in recent years. It is home to two scout groups, the 7th and 8th Eastleigh.

Fair Oak has a village hall and four pubs: 'The Old George', 'The Cricketers', 'The New Clock Inn', and 'The Fox and Hounds'.

There are three schools: infant, junior, and a secondary school, Wyvern College, which has a public gym. There is also an independent Christian school, The King's School Senior. In 2017 Fair Oak Junior School represented the South of England in football.

In 2020, Hampshire County Council announced plans to close Fair Oak library.

== Stoke Park Wood ==
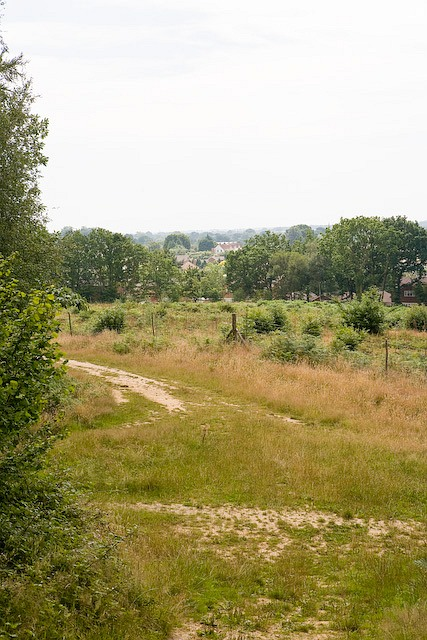
A clearing in Stoke Park Wood close to Fair Oak

Stoke Park Wood to the north-west of the village (a remnant of the Forest of Bere) lies partly in Fair Oak and partly in the neighbouring parish of Bishopstoke. With many bridleways running between the two villages via the woods, it is possible to walk from one village to another without setting foot on any other public highway. The woods cover some 207 hectares (510 acres) and are primarily of evergreen trees; the sandy soil and long grass is home to wildlife including dormice, grey squirrels, pine martens, deer and adders. This forest is the biggest in Eastleigh and several watercourses run through it.

Popular sites include the Eastleigh Falls, a semi-natural rapidly flowing chalk stream which supports a variety of locally rare plant and animal species. The site has been recognised as important habitat for Northern crested newt (Triturus cristatus). There are ongoing efforts by local activists to classify the area as an SSSI ensuring its protection from the proposed development projects. In 2015 a group of local volunteers saved 250 trees from destruction by transplanting them from Stokewood Park to Knowle Lane.

== Geology ==
Fair Oak lies on the London Clay deposits of the Hampshire Basin, to the northern edge of a small syncline separated from the main basin by the Portsdown anticline. The London Clay in this area, towards the top of the sequence, is fairly sandy and includes lenticular sand deposits. The sand pits on the east of the village are in the Whitecliff Sand. At Knowle Hill and south towards Horton Heath the London Clay is overlain by the clays and sands of Wittering Formation of the Bracklesham Group, with a small outlier capping Pylehill to the north.

== Sports ==
Fair Oak is the location of one of Hampshire's biggest cricket clubs, the Fair Oak Cricket Club. The home ground is Lapstone Park, at the end of Pavilion Close in Fair Oak. The first team are the only team from Eastleigh Borough to play in the Southern Premier League. FOCC's third and fourth teams do not play in Fair Oak itself, but the club homes all four sides at Lapstone Park for training and events. The club was established in 1947.

Fair Oak is the boyhood home of 1979 500cc motocross world champion, Graham Noyce.

== See also ==
- List of places of worship in the Borough of Eastleigh
