= Old Baptist Union =

The Old Baptist Union is a group of evangelical Baptist churches in the United Kingdom.

== History ==
The Old Baptist Union was founded in 1880, owing largely to the labours of Henry Augustus Squire, an itinerant preacher. Currently, the Old Baptist Union has 16 member churches (in England and Wales) with about 700 members.

The churches of the Old Baptist Union are General Baptist, believing in general atonement (that in His death, Jesus atoned generally for the sins of all). They historically put more emphasis on the laying on of hands, divine healing, and personal holiness than some other Baptist affiliations.

The Union is a member of both the Free Churches Council and the Evangelical Alliance, and most of its churches are members of local geographic associations of the Baptist Union of Great Britain. Its government structure is somewhat of a combination of congregational and presbyteral, involving in each church the appointment of elders. The Old Baptist Union's executive body is called the "Council of Management," and is composed of all the ordained officers of churches holding membership in the Union. An annual general meeting is held.

== Sources ==
- Articles of Faith of the Old Baptist Union
- Baptists Around the World, by Albert W. Wardin Jr.
