= St Mary's Church, Bishopstoke =

Church in Bishopstoke, Hampshire, England

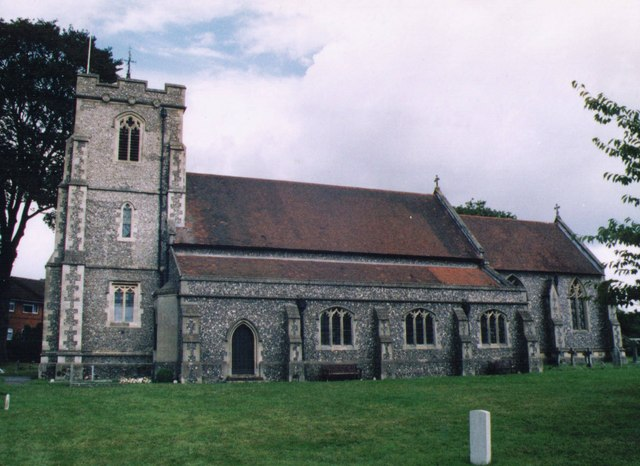
St Mary's Church, Bishopstoke

The Church of St Mary's is an Anglican Church in Bishopstoke, Hampshire.

St Mary's was designed by Edward Prioleau Warren and built during 1890/91 by Wheeler Bros. of Reading, Berkshire at a cost of £4,200.

It was consecrated on 12 November 1891 by the Bishop of Guildford. Financial limitations meant that a Perpendicular tower included in the design had to be added later and this was completed in 1909.

This church replaced an earlier building called St Mary's Church which stood on a different site nearer to the River Itchen, (at 50.97224°N 1.33923°W). It had been rebuilt in 1825, but by 1908 had been completely demolished.
