= South Hampshire =

Conurbation in Hampshire, southern England

Coordinates: 50°52′N 1°16′W

The centres of the boroughs which make up the bulk of the urban area

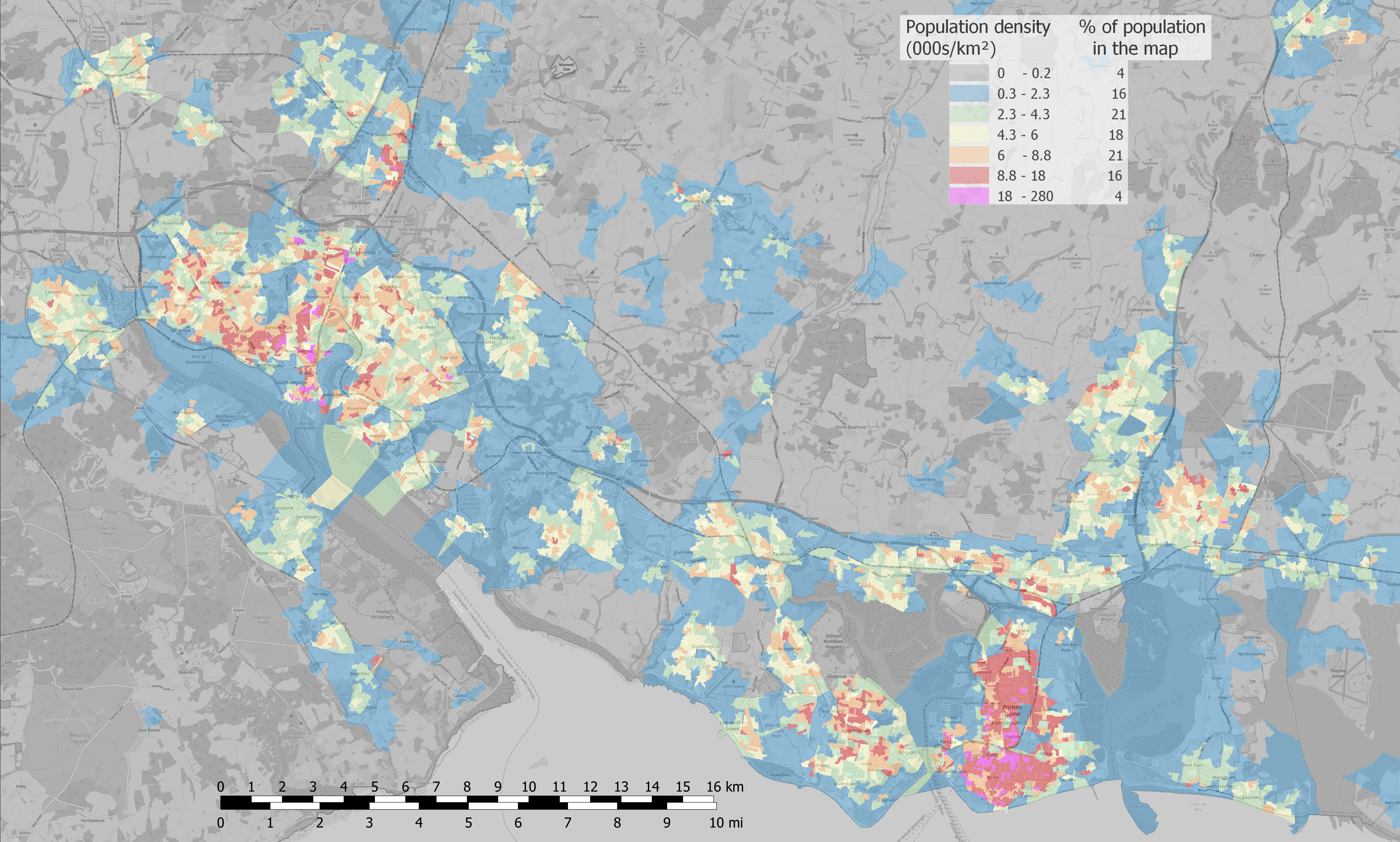
Population density map

South Hampshire is a term used mainly to refer to the conurbation formed by the city of Portsmouth, city of Southampton and the boroughs of Gosport, Fareham, Havant and Eastleigh in southern Hampshire, South East England. Using the definition of the agglomeration used by CityPopulation.de, the area had a population of 1,151,300 in the 2021 census. The area has sometimes been referred to as Solent City, particularly in relation to proposed local devolution, but the term is controversial.

== History ==
Harold Wilson's Labour government commissioned town planner Colin Buchanan in 1965 to study the region. He found a region of growing economic importance, in desperate need of proper planning to avoid unplanned sprawl, and suggested the construction of a modernist urban area between Southampton and Portsmouth. However this was resisted by local authorities who occupied the proposed development sites, and Buchanan's plans were never put into effect.

Instead, as a result of high-tech industry and services, the area was able to grow largely without overall planning to become perhaps the most densely populated region of the UK. In the late 20th century mass manufacturing of ordinary commodities declined, leaving several town and city neighbourhoods impoverished and suffering unemployment; however by the early 21st century high income and retirement properties came to dominate some neighbourhoods, particularly close to universities, and many suburbs and exurbs. Centrally planned building programmes included large estates, connected by new road networks, for commercial and residential use by Hampshire County Council's architects, led by Colin Stansfield Smith. Otherwise development has tended to be on a case-by-case basis for retail parks, business parks and housing.

The Solent Local Enterprise Partnership (LEP) is a collaboration between local authorities, universities and businesses set up in 2011 by the Department for Business, Innovation and Skills. Different departments of the Solent LEP are distributed across the area, with its 'Growth Hub' being based in Southampton. On 12 November 2013 the government announced the second wave of City Deals, with a successful joint bid of Southampton and Portsmouth providing £953 million of investment into the Solent LEP.

== Devolution ==
Various attempts at a South Hampshire or Solent City devolution deal have been made, but saw minor local resistance, stemming from the Southampton-Portsmouth rivalry, as well as from the more rural Isle of Wight. Whilst the proposal did otherwise see continued support, particularly from councillors, by 2018 talks with the government had stalled. More recent proposals have included southeast Dorset, that is Bournemouth, Christchurch and Poole (BCP). After another bid was submitted in 2021, Gerald Vernon-Jackson claimed the government were "keen" on including BCP in a potential deal. A November 2022 report by BCP Council suggested a Central South deal as an alternative to a Pan-Hampshire deal with BCP tacked on.

In 2027 the area will be reorganised into two unitary authorities: South West Hampshire focused on Southampton, and South East Hampshire focused on Portsmouth. These will sit under the Hampshire and the Solent Combined County Authority.

== Geography ==
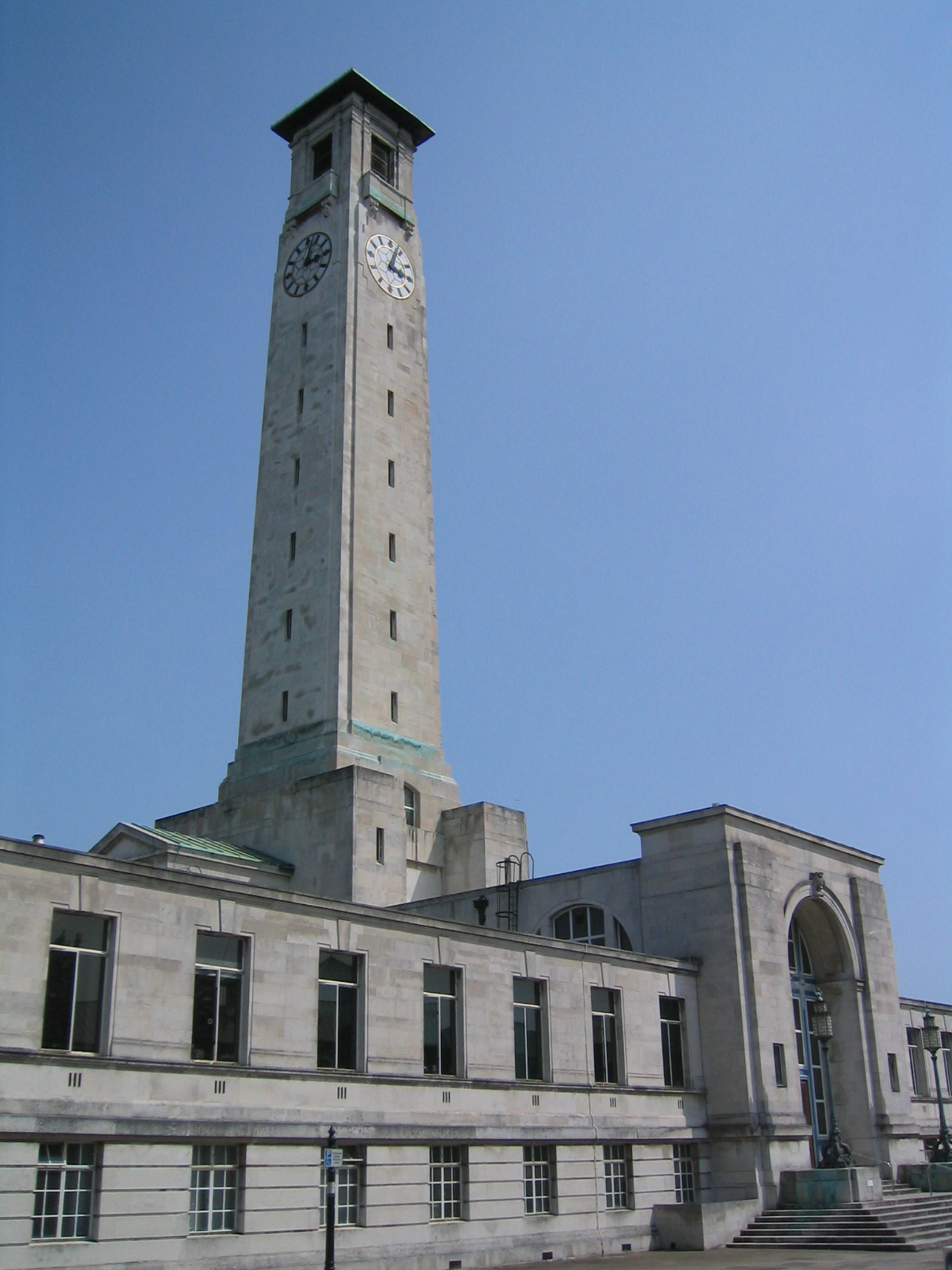
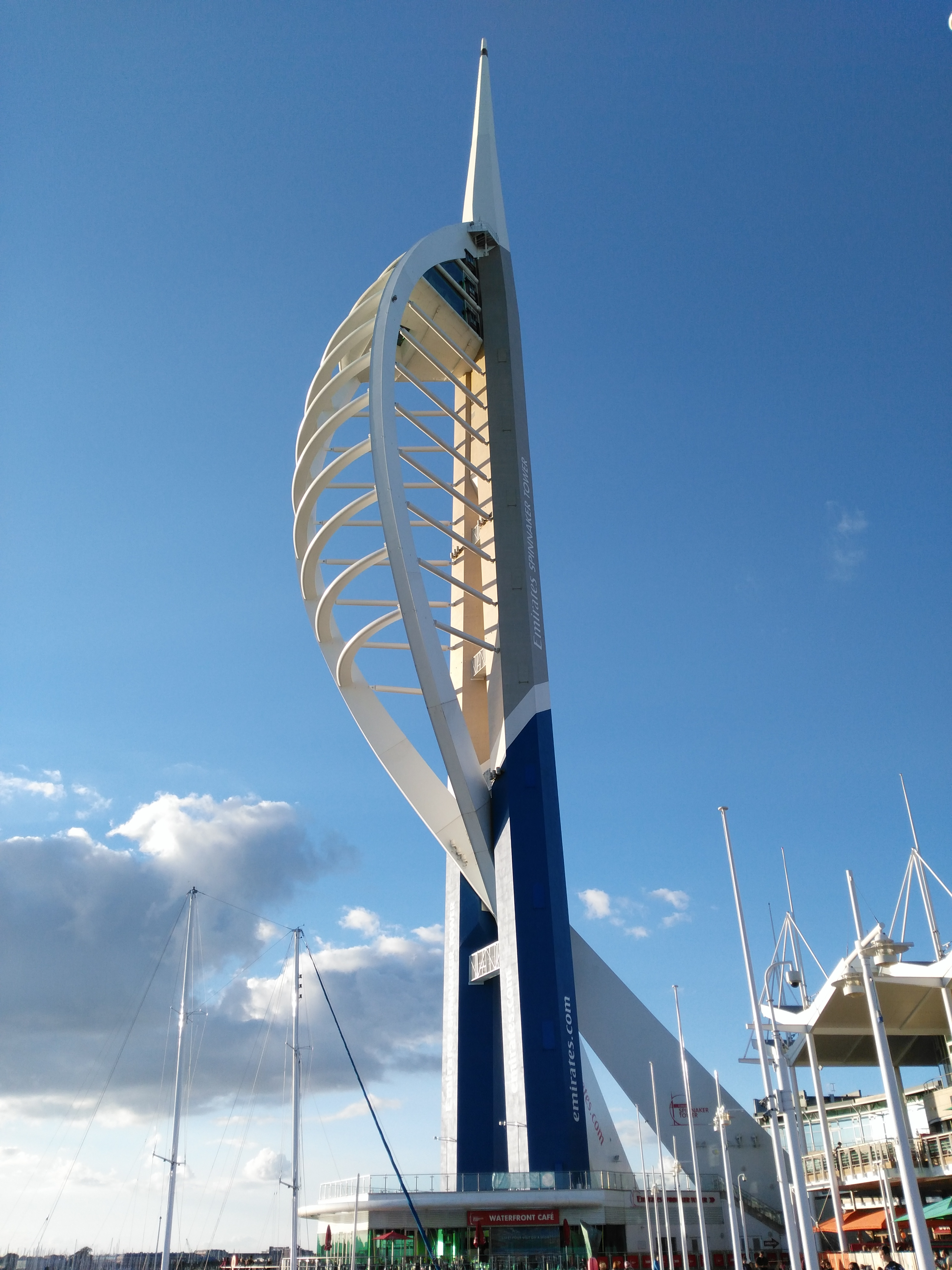
Southampton and Portsmouth are the largest urban centres of South Hampshire

The region can be subdivided into two conurbations, one centred around Southampton and one around Portsmouth. Most of the area is in the Hampshire districts of Gosport, Fareham, Havant, Eastleigh, Portsmouth and Southampton. All of these districts have high population densities, with Portsmouth and Southampton being the most densely populated districts in England outside Greater London. Other parts of the area are in the Test Valley, East Hampshire, City of Winchester and New Forest districts, all of which have lower population densities. Small parts of the area are also in the West Sussex district of Chichester.

== Climate ==
The climate is temperate oceanic, Cfb in the Köppen climate classification.

Climate data for Southampton, elevation 3 m, 1981–2010
Month	Jan	Feb	Mar	Apr	May	Jun	Jul	Aug	Sep	Oct	Nov	Dec	Year
Mean daily maximum °C (°F)	8.4 (47.1)	8.6 (47.5)	11.1 (52.0)	14.0 (57.2)	17.5 (63.5)	20.2 (68.4)	22.4 (72.3)	22.3 (72.1)	19.8 (67.6)	15.6 (60.1)	11.7 (53.1)	8.9 (48.0)	15.1 (59.2)
Mean daily minimum °C (°F)	2.9 (37.2)	2.6 (36.7)	4.1 (39.4)	5.7 (42.3)	9.0 (48.2)	11.7 (53.1)	13.7 (56.7)	13.7 (56.7)	11.4 (52.5)	8.9 (48.0)	5.4 (41.7)	3.2 (37.8)	7.7 (45.9)
Average rainfall mm (inches)	81.4 (3.20)	58.3 (2.30)	60.0 (2.36)	50.7 (2.00)	49.0 (1.93)	50.4 (1.98)	42.0 (1.65)	50.4 (1.98)	60.4 (2.38)	93.8 (3.69)	94.0 (3.70)	89.2 (3.51)	779.4 (30.69)
Average rainy days (≥ 1.0 mm)	12.2	9.2	10.1	8.8	8.2	7.7	7.4	7.7	8.7	11.5	11.5	11.8	114.7
Mean monthly sunshine hours	63.3	84.4	118.3	179.8	212.1	211.2	221.8	207.7	148.1	113.0	76.6	52.9	1,689.3
Source 1: Met Office (normals)
Source 2: Calculated from Met Office Data

Climate data for Southsea, Portsmouth 1976-2006
Month	Jan	Feb	Mar	Apr	May	Jun	Jul	Aug	Sep	Oct	Nov	Dec	Year
Mean daily maximum °C (°F)	9.6 (49.3)	8.8 (47.8)	10.6 (51.1)	13.4 (56.1)	16.8 (62.2)	19.4 (66.9)	21.8 (71.2)	21.8 (71.2)	19.3 (66.7)	15.8 (60.4)	12.0 (53.6)	10.0 (50.0)	14.9 (58.9)
Mean daily minimum °C (°F)	5.1 (41.2)	4.3 (39.7)	5.4 (41.7)	6.4 (43.5)	9.6 (49.3)	12.3 (54.1)	15.0 (59.0)	15.0 (59.0)	12.8 (55.0)	10.9 (51.6)	7.5 (45.5)	5.9 (42.6)	9.2 (48.5)
Average precipitation mm (inches)	65 (2.6)	50 (2.0)	52 (2.0)	42 (1.7)	28 (1.1)	40 (1.6)	32 (1.3)	43 (1.7)	62 (2.4)	81 (3.2)	72 (2.8)	80 (3.1)	647 (25.5)
Average rainy days	11.2	9.5	8.3	7.6	6.5	7.4	5.4	6.6	8.5	10.9	10.3	11.2	103.4
Mean monthly sunshine hours	67.9	89.6	132.7	200.5	240.8	247.6	261.8	240.7	172.9	121.8	82.3	60.5	1,919.1
Percentage possible sunshine	26	31	36	49	51	51	54	54	46	37	31	25	41
Source: Met Office

Climate data for a Rough climate of Havant
Month	Jan	Feb	Mar	Apr	May	Jun	Jul	Aug	Sep	Oct	Nov	Dec	Year
Record high °C (°F)	17 (63)	16 (61)	21 (70)	25 (77)	32 (90)	36 (97)	35 (95)	37 (99)	34 (93)	27 (81)	18 (64)	16 (61)	37 (99)
Mean daily maximum °C (°F)	8 (46)	8 (46)	11 (52)	13 (55)	17 (63)	20 (68)	23 (73)	24 (75)	19 (66)	16 (61)	11 (52)	9 (48)	15 (59)
Mean daily minimum °C (°F)	2 (36)	1 (34)	3 (37)	5 (41)	8 (46)	11 (52)	13 (55)	14 (57)	12 (54)	8 (46)	5 (41)	3 (37)	7 (45)
Record low °C (°F)	−10 (14)	−9 (16)	−8 (18)	−4 (25)	−1 (30)	2 (36)	5 (41)	6 (43)	0 (32)	−4 (25)	−6 (21)	−8 (18)	−10 (14)
Average precipitation mm (inches)	85 (3.3)	60 (2.4)	62 (2.4)	54 (2.1)	50 (2.0)	50 (2.0)	42 (1.7)	57 (2.2)	74 (2.9)	90 (3.5)	85 (3.3)	90 (3.5)	799 (31.3)
Mean monthly sunshine hours	65	85	130	200	230	235	255	230	170	125	90	60	1,875
Source: Met Office

Climate data for Solent MRSC, (1981–2010 averages).
Month	Jan	Feb	Mar	Apr	May	Jun	Jul	Aug	Sep	Oct	Nov	Dec	Year
Mean daily maximum °C (°F)	8.2 (46.8)	8.2 (46.8)	10.5 (50.9)	13.2 (55.8)	16.7 (62.1)	19.2 (66.6)	21.4 (70.5)	21.4 (70.5)	19.0 (66.2)	15.5 (59.9)	11.5 (52.7)	8.7 (47.7)	14.5 (58.1)
Mean daily minimum °C (°F)	3.4 (38.1)	2.8 (37.0)	4.5 (40.1)	6.1 (43.0)	9.2 (48.6)	12.1 (53.8)	14.2 (57.6)	14.3 (57.7)	12.2 (54.0)	9.6 (49.3)	6.2 (43.2)	3.8 (38.8)	8.2 (46.8)
Average rainfall mm (inches)	68.8 (2.71)	49.3 (1.94)	51.6 (2.03)	42.4 (1.67)	43.4 (1.71)	42.0 (1.65)	44.5 (1.75)	50.0 (1.97)	53.7 (2.11)	86.2 (3.39)	83.2 (3.28)	83.9 (3.30)	699 (27.51)
Average precipitation days (≥ 1 mm)	11.6	9.6	8.3	8.3	7.1	6.9	7.0	7.3	8.7	10.5	11.2	12.2	108.6
Source: Met Office Solent MRSC, Thorney Island

== Demography ==
The following Built-up areas fall inside the South Hampshire metropolitan area have a combined population of 1,086,786.

=== By council boundaries ===
Map of the districts making up Portsmouth urban area (blue) and Southampton urban area (red)

The following populations is those of council boundaries that are considered part of the South Hampshire conurbation.

=== South Hampshire built-up area ===
In the 2001 census Portsmouth and Southampton were recorded as being parts of separate urban areas; but by the 2011 census they had merged to become the sixth largest built-up area in England, with a population of 855,569. The new built-up area also merged with smaller urban areas called Locks Heath, Bursledon, Whiteley and Hedge End/Botley in the 2001 census.

Urban subdivision	Population		District
Urban subdivision	(2001 census)	(2011 census)	District
Portsmouth	187,056	238,137	City of Portsmouth
Gosport	69,348	71,529	Borough of Gosport
Fareham	56,160	42,210	Borough of Fareham
Havant	45,435	45,125	Borough of Havant
Lee-on-the-Solent	7,067		Borough of Gosport
Stubbington	13,628	14,077	Borough of Fareham
Waterlooville	63,558		Borough of Havant
Total Portsmouth urban area population	442,252		
Southampton	234,224	253,651	City of Southampton
Eastleigh	52,894	78,716	Borough of Eastleigh
Bishopstoke	17,282		Borough of Eastleigh
Total Southampton urban area population	304,400		
Locks Heath & surrounding villages	36,452	43,359	Borough of Fareham
Bursledon	6,744	6,955	Borough of Eastleigh
Whiteley	2,195	3,236	Borough of Fareham/City of Winchester
Total Western Wards population	45,391	53,550	
Hedge End	21,174	25,117	Borough of Eastleigh
Botley	2,506	5,083	Borough of Eastleigh
Total Hedge End/Botley population	23,680	30,200	
Horndean		46,924	East Hampshire/Borough of Havant
Total South Hampshire built-up area population		855,569	

Notes:

- Portchester is included under the Portsmouth subdivision in the 2011 census whilst in the 2001 census it was part of the Fareham subdivision.
- Whiteley is included under the Locks Heath subdivision in the 2011 census.
- Stubbington and Lee-on-the-Solent formed a separate urban area according to the 2011 census.
- Bishopstoke and Horton Heath were included as part of the Eastleigh subdivision in the 2011 census.
- Botley was included as part of the Hedge End subdivision in the 2011 census.
- The Waterlooville subdivision was split between the Portsmouth subdivision and the Horndean subdivision for the 2011 census.

=== Other built-up areas ===
Location of other built-up areas in Hampshire

There are three other significant urban areas in the area:

Urban subdivision	Population (2001 census)	Population (2011 census)	District
Ashurst/Netley Marsh	3,116	3,212	New Forest District
Totton	27,986	28,676	New Forest District
Bartley		2,281	New Forest District
Total Totton built-up area population	31,102	34,169	
Winchester built-up area	41,420	46,074	City of Winchester
Stubbington built-up area		24,644	Borough of Fareham/Borough of Gosport
Hythe built-up area	19,599	20,201	New Forest District

There are fourteen smaller urban areas also in the region:

Urban area	Population (2001 census)	Population (2011 census)	District
Colden Common	3,249	3,419	City of Winchester
Compton/Otterbourne	2,261	2,569	City of Winchester
Denmead	5,788	6,107	City of Winchester
Emsworth/Southbourne	18,139	18,777	Borough of Havant/Chichester District
Fawley/Blackfield	13,775	13,712	New Forest District
Hamble	3,853	4,696	Borough of Eastleigh
Hayling Island	14,842	15,485	Borough of Havant
Horton Heath	2,223		Borough of Eastleigh
Kings Worthy	4,292	4,901	City of Winchester
Marchwood	5,586	6,141	New Forest District
Netley	6,150	6,338	Borough of Eastleigh
North Baddesley	6,234	6,823	Test Valley
Romsey	17,386	17,161	Test Valley

Notes:

- Horton Heath forms part of the South Hampshire built-up area in the 2011 census rather than being a separate area.
- In the 2011 census the Fawley urban area was renamed the Blackfield built-up area.
- In the 2011 census the Kings Worthy urban area was renamed the Springvale built-up area.
- In the 2011 census the Hayling Island urban area was renamed the South Hayling built-up area.

== Other towns in the area ==
Slightly further out there are many surrounding towns and villages as well as the city of Chichester which are not directly close to Southampton or Portsmouth, or necessarily in their travel to work areas. Some of these settlements rely on the latter cities for employment or retail due to close proximity but are not limited to these alone.

Places within the wider Portsmouth-Southampton Metropolitan area include:

Settlement	County
Andover	Hampshire
Bishop's Waltham	Hampshire
Bognor Regis	West Sussex
Brockenhurst	Hampshire
Chichester	West Sussex
Lyndhurst	Hampshire
Salisbury	Wiltshire

== See also ==
- South Hampshire Plan
- BBC Radio Solent
- ESPON metropolitan areas in the United Kingdom
- List of urban areas in the United Kingdom
- M27 motorway
