= Horton Heath, Hampshire =

Village in Hampshire, England

Coordinates: 50°57′N 1°18′W

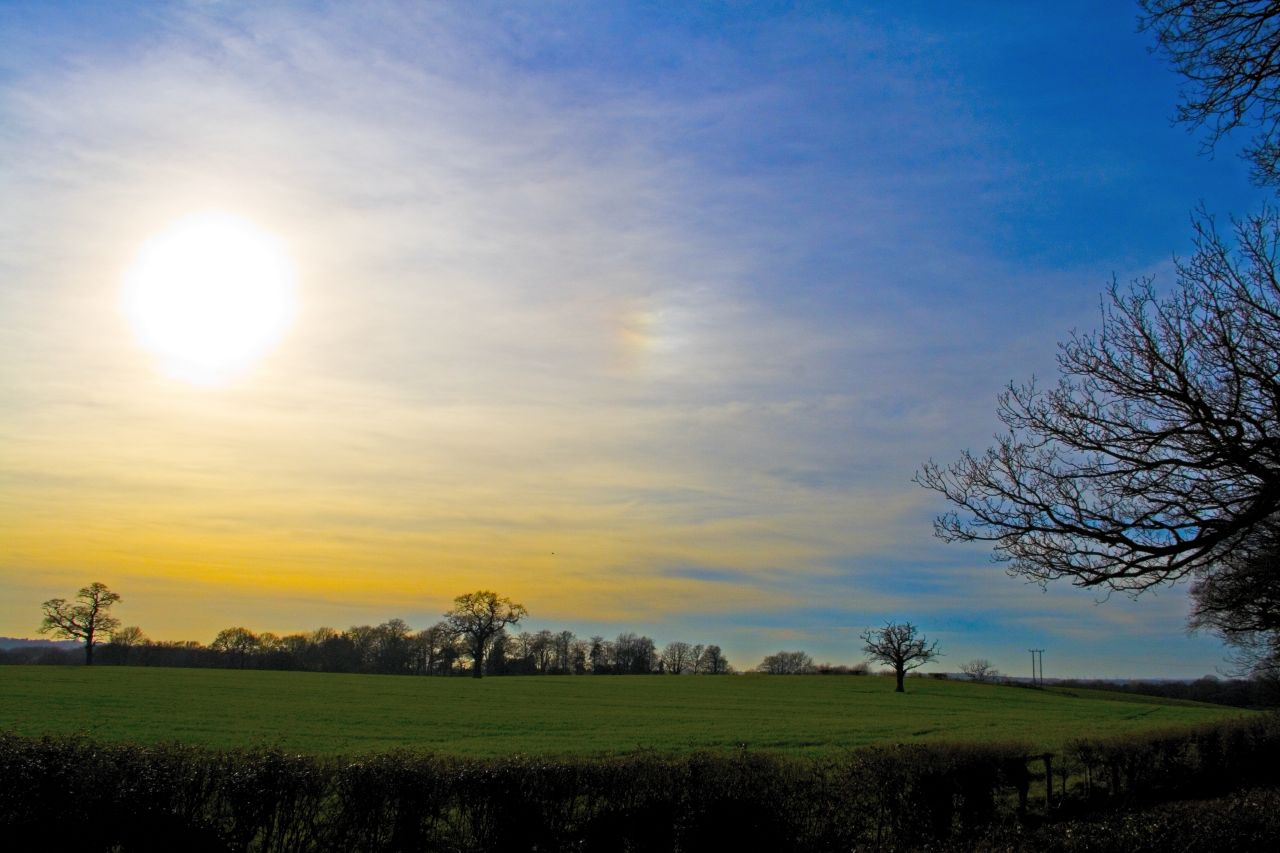
Countryside near Horton Heath

Horton Heath is a semi-rural village which forms part of the civil parish of Fair Oak and Horton Heath in the borough of Eastleigh in Hampshire, England. The village is about three miles southeast of Eastleigh town centre, and adjoins the village of Fair Oak.

The village greatly expanded during the late 1980s and 1990s, with developments such as The Drove and Meadowsweet way. A new village hall was also built at this time.

In 2014 a further development was proposed and permission was eventually granted for 2500 homes to be constructed on a 310ha area situated to the south west of the original village. The development is meant to include a mix of housing, green spaces, commercial premises and sports and leisure facilities.

It forms part of the Southampton Urban Area.

The current councillor is Liberal Democrat Michelle Marsh, who represents the Fair Oak & Horton Heath ward. Marsh campaigned against local felling.

The village has two pubs, The Brigadier Gerard and The Lapstone.
