= Eastleigh Borough Council elections =

Local government elections in Hampshire, England

One third of Eastleigh Borough Council is elected each year, followed by one year without election.

== Political control ==
Election	Overall control	Lib Dem	Conservative	Labour	Ind.
1973	No overall control	5	13	20	4
1976	Conservative	1	36	6	1
1978	Conservative	1	37	4	1
1979	Conservative	2	34	7	1
1980	Conservative	4	31	9	-
1982	Conservative	8	25	11	-
1983	No overall control	11	22	11	-
1984	No overall control	14	20	10	-
1986	No overall control	19	16	9	-
1987	No overall control	21	15	8	-
1988	Social and Liberal Democrats	23	15	6	-
1990	No overall control	22	16	6	-
1991	No overall control	20	17	7	-
1992	No overall control	19	19	6	-
1994	No overall control	22	18	4	-
1995	Liberal Democrats	27	13	4	-
1996	Liberal Democrats	31	7	6	-
1998	Liberal Democrats	29	7	8	-
1999	Liberal Democrats	29	7	8	-
2000	Liberal Democrats	28	9	7	-
2002	Liberal Democrats	31	9	4	-
2003	Liberal Democrats	30	10	4	-
2004	Liberal Democrats	32	9	3	-
2006	Liberal Democrats	34	7	3	-
2007	Liberal Democrats	37	5	2	-
2008	Liberal Democrats	38	4	2	-
2010	Liberal Democrats	39	4	1	-
2011	Liberal Democrats	38	4	0	2
2012	Liberal Democrats	40	4	0	0
2014	Liberal Democrats	40	4	0	0
2015	Liberal Democrats	38	6	0	0
2016	Liberal Democrats	38	6	0	0
2018	Liberal Democrats	32	4	0	3
2019	Liberal Democrats	34	2	0	3
2021	Liberal Democrats	32	2	0	5
2022	Liberal Democrats	33	1	0	5
2023	Liberal Democrats	35	1	0	3
2024	Liberal Democrats	35	1	0	3
2026	Liberal Democrats	35 (Note: Includes vacant seat in Hedge End South last held by the Liberal Democrats.)	1	0	3

== Council elections ==
- 1973 Eastleigh Borough Council election
- 1976 Eastleigh Borough Council election (New ward boundaries)
- 1979 Eastleigh Borough Council election
- 1980 Eastleigh Borough Council election
- 1982 Eastleigh Borough Council election
- 1983 Eastleigh Borough Council election
- 1984 Eastleigh Borough Council election
- 1986 Eastleigh Borough Council election (Borough boundary changes took place but the number of seats remained the same)
- 1987 Eastleigh Borough Council election
- 1988 Eastleigh Borough Council election
- 1990 Eastleigh Borough Council election
- 1991 Eastleigh Borough Council election
- 1992 Eastleigh Borough Council election
- 1994 Eastleigh Borough Council election
- 1995 Eastleigh Borough Council election
- 1996 Eastleigh Borough Council election
- 1998 Eastleigh Borough Council election
- 1999 Eastleigh Borough Council election
- 2000 Eastleigh Borough Council election
- 2002 Eastleigh Borough Council election (New ward boundaries)
- 2003 Eastleigh Borough Council election
- 2004 Eastleigh Borough Council election
- 2006 Eastleigh Borough Council election
- 2007 Eastleigh Borough Council election
- 2008 Eastleigh Borough Council election
- 2010 Eastleigh Borough Council election
- 2011 Eastleigh Borough Council election
- 2012 Eastleigh Borough Council election
- 2014 Eastleigh Borough Council election
- 2015 Eastleigh Borough Council election
- 2016 Eastleigh Borough Council election
- 2018 Eastleigh Borough Council election (New ward boundaries)
- 2019 Eastleigh Borough Council election
- 2021 Eastleigh Borough Council election
- 2022 Eastleigh Borough Council election
- 2023 Eastleigh Borough Council election
- 2024 Eastleigh Borough Council election
- 2026 Eastleigh Borough Council election

== District result maps ==
2002 results map

2003 results map

2004 results map

2006 results map

2007 results map

2008 results map

2010 results map

2011 results map

2012 results map

2014 results map

2015 results map

2016 results map

2018 results map

2019 results map

2021 results map

2022 results map

2023 results map

2024 results map

2026 results map

== By-election results ==
=== 1994-1998 ===
Bishopstoke By-Election 27 June 1996
Party	Candidate	Votes	%	±%
Labour		1,050	41.6	
Liberal Democrats		1,012	40.2	−20.7
Conservative		458	18.2	
Majority		38	1.4	
Turnout		2,520	35.0	
Labour gain from Liberal Democrats		Swing		

=== 2014-2018 ===
West End North by-election 11 February 2016
Party	Candidate	Votes	%	±%
Liberal Democrats	Janice Asman	582	53.0	+13.2
Conservative	Steven Broomfield	315	28.7	−6.4
UKIP	Hugh McGuinness	115	10.5	−4.9
Labour	Andy Andrews	58	5.3	−4.3
Green	Glynn Fleming	28	2.6	+2.6
Majority		267	24.3	
Turnout		1,098		
Liberal Democrats hold		Swing		

Fair Oak and Horton Heath by-election 3 November 2016
Party	Candidate	Votes	%	±%
Liberal Democrats	Nicholas Couldrey	828	46.0	+6.8
Conservative	Steven Broomfield	553	30.7	+3.7
UKIP	George McGuinness	286	15.9	−6.5
Labour	John Sorley	132	7.3	−4.1
Majority		275	15.3	
Turnout		1,808		
Liberal Democrats hold		Swing		

Hedge End Wildern by-election 22 December 2016
Party	Candidate	Votes	%	±%
Liberal Democrats	Ian Corben	672	64.5	+22.5
Conservative	Ben Burcombe-Filer	263	25.2	−2.5
Labour	Terry Crow	107	10.3	−1.6
Majority		409	39.3	
Turnout		1,042		
Liberal Democrats hold		Swing		

Eastleigh Central by-election 4 May 2017
Party	Candidate	Votes	%	±%
Liberal Democrats	Tina Campbell	1,431	50.4	+8.7
Conservative	Simon Payne	501	17.6	+3.8
UKIP	Andy Moore	458	16.1	−9.1
Labour	Steve Phillips	452	15.9	−3.4
Majority		930	32.7	
Turnout		2,842		
Liberal Democrats hold		Swing		

Hedge End Grange Park by-election 29 June 2017
Party	Candidate	Votes	%	±%
Liberal Democrats	Clifford Morris	669	56.5	+15.5
Conservative	Joyce Haythorne	316	26.7	−10.9
Labour	Keith Day	144	12.2	+0.9
Green	Rosanna Campbell	41	3.5	N/A
UKIP	Peter House	14	1.2	−9.0
Majority		353	29.8	
Turnout		1,185		
Liberal Democrats hold		Swing		

=== 2018-2022 ===
Eastleigh Central by-election 10 February 2022
Party	Candidate	Votes	%	±%
Liberal Democrats	Bhavin Dedha	802	44.5	+7.6
Labour	Josh Constable	433	24.0	−4.8
Conservative	Simon Payne	362	20.1	−5.0
Green	Jack Stapleton	140	7.8	+7.8
Reform	Clare Fawcett	64	3.6	+0.2
Majority		369	20.5	
Turnout		1,801		
Liberal Democrats hold		Swing		

=== 2022-2026 ===
Hamble and Netley by-election 6 March 2025
Party	Candidate	Votes	%	±%
Liberal Democrats	Prad Bains	1,224	52.1	−6.7
Reform	Russ Kitching	542	23.1	+23.1
Conservative	Marley Guthrie	421	17.9	+3.0
Labour	Chris Rogers	164	7.0	+0.5
Majority		682	29.0	
Turnout		2,351		
Liberal Democrats hold		Swing		

Eastleigh Central by-election 8 May 2025
Party	Candidate	Votes	%	±%
Liberal Democrats	Mark Harding	1,020	46.6	+9.2
Reform	Sukhdev Raj	611	27.9	+20.0
Labour	Zak Southward	319	14.6	−18.8
Conservative	Albie Slawson	149	6.8	−7.0
Independent	Venkhata Varadharajan	90	4.1	
Majority		409	18.7	
Turnout		2,189		
Liberal Democrats hold		Swing		

Hedge End South by-election 22 May 2025
Party	Candidate	Votes	%	±%
Liberal Democrats	John Shepherd	1,266	44.4	−8.7
Conservative	Jerry Hall	735	25.8	−3.8
Reform	Craig Palmer	728	25.5	+25.5
Labour	Keith Day	122	4.3	−6.6
Majority		531	18.6	
Turnout		2,851		
Liberal Democrats hold		Swing		

=== 2026-2030 ===
Hedge End South by-election 30 July 2026
Party	Candidate	Votes	%	±%
Liberal Democrats	Jim Paine	1,086	46.1	
Conservative	Jerry Hall	589	25.0	
Reform	Neil Fleming	443	18.8	
Green	Keith Day	199	8.4	
Labour	Will Banks	41	1.7	
Majority		497	21.1	
Turnout		2,358		
Liberal Democrats hold		Swing		
