= 2008 Eastleigh Borough Council election =

2008 English local government election

Map of the 2008 Eastleigh Borough Borough Council election

The 2008 Eastleigh Borough Borough Council election took place on 1 May 2008 to elect a third of the members of Eastleigh Borough Council, the council of Eastleigh in England. This was on the same day as the other 2008 United Kingdom local elections. The previous council election took place in 2007 and the following election was held in 2010. In the election, the council stayed under Liberal Democrat control.

== Results ==
Party	Previous	Seats +/-	2008
Liberal Democrat	37	▲1	38
Conservative	5	▼1	4
Labour	2	Steady	2

== See also ==
- Eastleigh Borough Council elections
