= 2018 Eastleigh Borough Council election =

2018 UK local government election

← 2016	3 May 2018	2019 →

All 39 seats to Eastleigh Borough Council 20 seats needed for a majority
	First party	Second party	Third party
Party	Liberal Democrats	Conservative	Independents
Seats before	33	6	5
Seats won	32	4	3
Seat change	▼1	▼2	▼2
Popular vote	49,665	26,506	6,048
Percentage	51.1%	27.2%	6.2%
Council control before election
Liberal Democrats
Council control after election
Liberal Democrats

The 2018 Eastleigh Borough Council election took place on 3 May 2018 to elect all members of Eastleigh Borough Council. The election was on new boundaries, with the overall size of the council being reduced by five seats, from 44 to 39. The outcome was a decisive victory for the incumbent Liberal Democrats.

== Results summary ==
Eastleigh Borough Council election 2018
Party	Seats	Gains	Losses	Net gain/loss	Seats %	Votes %	Votes	+/−
Liberal Democrats	32	0	1	▼1	82.1	51.1	49,665	
Conservative	4	0	2	▼2	10.3	27.2	26,506	
Independent	3	0	2	▼2	7.7	6.2	6,048	
Labour	0	0	0	Steady	0.0	12.0	11,674	
UKIP	0	0	0	Steady	0.0	2.1	2,014	
Green	0	0	0	Steady	0.0	1.4	1,375	

== Ward results ==
A * denotes an incumbent councillor seeking reelection.

=== Bishopstoke ===
Bishopstoke
Party	Candidate	Votes	%	±%
Independent	Louise Parker-Jones	1,618	44.6	
Independent	Virginia Tidridge	1,477	40.7	
Independent	Raymond Dean	1,449	40.0	
Liberal Democrats	Trevor Mignot*	1,256	34.6	
Liberal Democrats	Victoria Parkinson*	1,202	33.1	
Liberal Democrats	Anne Winstanley*	1,197	33.0	
Labour	Christine McKeone	626	17.3	
Labour	Susan Toher	440	12.1	
Labour	Ray Bellinger	368	10.1	
Conservative	Nicholas Arnold	363	10.0	
Conservative	Jamie Mills	310	8.5	
UKIP	John Edwards	291	8.0	
Conservative	Jordan Howe-Piper	282	7.8	
Total votes		3,630		
Independent win (new seat)				
Independent win (new seat)				
Independent win (new seat)				

=== Botley ===
Botley
Party	Candidate	Votes	%	±%
Liberal Democrats	Rupert Kyrle*	927	55.2	
Liberal Democrats	Adrian Trace	833	49.6	
Conservative	Joyce Haythorne	599	35.7	
Conservative	Stephen Wildin	537	32.0	
Labour	Andrew Helps	134	8.0	
Labour	Callum Williamson	121	7.2	
UKIP	Janet Weller	67	4.0	
Total votes		1,682		
Liberal Democrats win (new seat)				
Liberal Democrats win (new seat)				

=== Bursledon & Hound North ===
Bursledon & Hound North
Party	Candidate	Votes	%	±%
Liberal Democrats	Antonia Craig*	1,158	58.0	
Liberal Democrats	Stephen Holes*	1,128	56.5	
Liberal Democrats	Lyndsey Rich*	1,124	56.3	
Conservative	John Milne	503	25.2	
Conservative	Michael Holliday	419	21.0	
Conservative	Sarah Davies	402	20.2	
Labour	Peter Chilton	194	9.7	
Labour	Margaret Ashton	160	8.0	
Labour	Edward White	135	6.8	
UKIP	Christopher Martin	124	6.2	
Total votes		1,999		
Liberal Democrats win (new seat)				
Liberal Democrats win (new seat)				
Liberal Democrats win (new seat)				

=== Chandler's Ford ===
Chandler's Ford
Party	Candidate	Votes	%	±%
Liberal Democrats	Alan Broadhurst*	1,796	55.0	
Liberal Democrats	David Pragnell*	1,612	49.4	
Liberal Democrats	Timothy Groves	1,611	49.4	
Conservative	Benjamin Dolbear	1,026	31.4	
Conservative	Daniel Newcombe	1,007	30.9	
Conservative	Ian Bennett	956	29.3	
Labour	Gillian Connell	350	10.7	
Labour	Sarah Mann	313	9.6	
Labour	Jennifer Prior	295	9.0	
UKIP	Peter House	166	5.1	
Total votes		3,289		
Liberal Democrats win (new seat)				
Liberal Democrats win (new seat)				
Liberal Democrats win (new seat)				

=== Eastleigh Central ===
Eastleigh Central
Party	Candidate	Votes	%	±%
Liberal Democrats	Tina Campbell*	1,163	46.8	
Liberal Democrats	Wayne Irish*	1,090	43.8	
Liberal Democrats	Jephthe Doguie	976	39.2	
Labour	Joshua Constable	649	26.1	
Labour	Jillian Payne	640	25.7	
Conservative	Paula Payne	469	18.9	
Labour	Sattar Shere-Mohammod	463	18.6	
Conservative	Paul Joseph	394	15.8	
Conservative	Leah Mills	360	14.5	
UKIP	Andrew Moore	306	12.3	
Green	Lynn Sheil	295	11.9	
Total votes		2,491		
Liberal Democrats win (new seat)				
Liberal Democrats win (new seat)				
Liberal Democrats win (new seat)				

=== Eastleigh North ===
Eastleigh North
Party	Candidate	Votes	%	±%
Liberal Democrats	Daniel Clarke*	1,172	45.5	
Liberal Democrats	Rosemary Reynolds	1,076	41.8	
Liberal Democrats	Sara Tyson-Payne	984	38.2	
Independent	David Betts	541	21.0	
Independent	Steven Sollitt*	522	20.3	
Independent	Christopher Thomas*	441	17.1	
Conservative	Simon Payne	413	16.0	
Conservative	Jeanette Fox	359	13.9	
Conservative	Iwona Page	332	12.9	
Labour	Kathleen O'Neill	316	12.3	
Labour	Eileen Marks	308	12.0	
Labour	Steven Phillips	294	11.4	
Green	Alexander Hughes	229	8.9	
UKIP	Paul Webber	174	6.8	
Total votes		2,582		
Liberal Democrats win (new seat)				
Liberal Democrats win (new seat)				
Liberal Democrats win (new seat)				

=== Eastleigh South ===
Eastleigh South
Party	Candidate	Votes	%	±%
Liberal Democrats	Paul Bicknell*	1,167	52.0	
Liberal Democrats	Alex Bourne	1,066	47.5	
Liberal Democrats	Darshan Mann*	964	42.9	
Labour	Peter Luffman	602	26.8	
Labour	Tanya Judd	569	25.3	
Labour	Gwyneth Rees	463	20.6	
Conservative	Deborah Brewer	411	18.3	
Conservative	Scott Harris	356	15.9	
Conservative	Chloe Simpson	341	15.2	
UKIP	Glynn Davies-Dear	231	10.3	
Total votes		2,249		
Liberal Democrats win (new seat)				
Liberal Democrats win (new seat)				
Liberal Democrats win (new seat)				

=== Fair Oak & Horton Heath ===
Fair Oak & Horton Heath
Party	Candidate	Votes	%	±%
Liberal Democrats	Robert Rushton*	1,236	41.7	
Liberal Democrats	Nicholas Couldrey*	1,234	41.7	
Conservative	Steven Broomfield	1,188	40.1	
Liberal Democrats	Desmond Scott*	1,125	38.0	
Conservative	Jacqueline Zieba	837	28.3	
Conservative	Katharine Bradshaw	756	25.5	
Green	Paul Openshaw	412	13.9	
Labour	Mary Shephard	408	13.8	
UKIP	Martin Lyon	372	12.5	
Labour	Emma Kettle	321	10.8	
Labour	Philip Baker	307	10.4	
Total votes		2,972		
Liberal Democrats win (new seat)				
Liberal Democrats win (new seat)				
Conservative win (new seat)				

=== Hamble & Netley ===
Hamble & Netley
Party	Candidate	Votes	%	±%
Liberal Democrats	David Airey*	1,879	62.0	
Liberal Democrats	Malcolm Cross*	1,853	61.2	
Liberal Democrats	Adam Manning	1,690	55.8	
Conservative	Edward Giles	846	27.9	
Conservative	Susan Hall	678	22.4	
Conservative	Lisa Moody	657	21.7	
Labour	Peter Chilton	302	10.0	
Labour	Margaret Ashton	281	9.3	
Labour	Edward White	261	8.6	
Total votes		3,035		
Liberal Democrats win (new seat)				
Liberal Democrats win (new seat)				
Liberal Democrats win (new seat)				

=== Hedge End North ===
Hedge End North
Party	Candidate	Votes	%	±%
Liberal Democrats	Lucy Jurd	1,114	54.2	
Liberal Democrats	Derek Pretty*	1,105	53.8	
Liberal Democrats	Ian Corben*	1,080	52.6	
Conservative	Stephanie Arnold	549	26.7	
Conservative	Douglas Fox	473	23.0	
Conservative	Benjamin Burcombe-Filer	455	22.1	
Labour	Stephen Ashe	243	11.8	
Labour	Geoffrey Budd	243	11.8	
Green	Rosanna Campbell	187	9.1	
Labour	Kevin Williamson	160	7.8	
UKIP	John Tomlin	81	3.9	
Total votes		2,056		
Liberal Democrats win (new seat)				
Liberal Democrats win (new seat)				
Liberal Democrats win (new seat)				

=== Hedge End South ===
Hedge End South
Party	Candidate	Votes	%	±%
Liberal Democrats	Margaret Allingham*	1,933	57.3	
Liberal Democrats	Keith House*	1,894	56.2	
Liberal Democrats	Cynthia Garton*	1,863	55.3	
Conservative	Jeremy Hall	1,157	34.3	
Conservative	Christopher Yates	1,016	30.1	
Conservative	Andrea Lunnon	1,008	29.9	
Labour	Keith Day	182	5.4	
Labour	Terence Crow	173	5.1	
Labour	Betty Layland	155	4.6	
UKIP	George McGuinness	133	3.9	
Total votes		3,379		
Liberal Democrats win (new seat)				
Liberal Democrats win (new seat)				
Liberal Democrats win (new seat)				

=== Hiltingbury ===
Hiltingbury
Party	Candidate	Votes	%	±%
Conservative	Judith Grajewski*	1,888	51.1	
Conservative	Margaret Atkinson*	1,793	48.5	
Conservative	Michael Hughes*	1,726	46.7	
Liberal Democrats	James Duguid	1,540	41.7	
Liberal Democrats	Peter Child	1,457	39.4	
Liberal Democrats	Rebecca Allen	1,416	38.3	
Labour	Kevin Butt	257	7.0	
Labour	John Prior	227	6.1	
Labour	Michael Tibble	222	6.0	
Total votes		3,714		
Conservative win (new seat)				
Conservative win (new seat)				
Conservative win (new seat)				

=== West End North ===
West End North
Party	Candidate	Votes	%	±%
Liberal Democrats	Bruce Tennent*	975	61.6	
Liberal Democrats	Richard Gomer	934	59.0	
Conservative	Anna Linsdell	367	23.2	
Conservative	Thomas Yates	327	20.7	
Green	Glynn Fleming	122	7.7	
Labour	Alison Phillips	105	6.6	
Labour	Geoffrey Kosted	104	6.6	
UKIP	Andrew Whitehouse	69	4.4	
Total votes		1,583		
Liberal Democrats win (new seat)				
Liberal Democrats win (new seat)				

=== West End South ===
West End South
Party	Candidate	Votes	%	±%
Liberal Democrats	Janice Asman*	928	56.3	
Liberal Democrats	Carol Boulton*	907	55.0	
Conservative	Benjamin Greenwood	504	30.6	
Conservative	William Haythorne	442	26.8	
Labour	Stephen Willoughby	152	9.2	
Labour	Jacob Phillips	131	7.9	
Green	Tracy Weeks	130	7.9	
Total votes		1,655		
Liberal Democrats win (new seat)				
Liberal Democrats win (new seat)				
