= 2024 Eastleigh Borough Council election =

Local election in Hampshire, England

- 2 May 2024

12 of 39 seats on Eastleigh Borough Council 20 seats needed for a majority

	Majority party	Minority party	Third party
Leader	Keith House	Louise Parker-Jones	Steven Broomfield
Party	Liberal Democrats	Independent	Conservative
Leader's seat	Hedge End South	Bishopstoke	Fair Oak & Horton Heath
Last election	35	3	1
Seats before	35	3	1
Seats won	10	1	1
Seats after	35	3	1
Seat change	Steady	Steady	Steady
Popular vote	14,205	1,995	7,425
Percentage	47.7	6.7	24.9
- Results of the 2024 election
Leader before election
Keith House
Liberal Democrats
Leader after election
Keith House
Liberal Democrats

The 2024 Eastleigh Borough Council election was held on 2 May 2024 to elect members of Eastleigh Borough Council, taking place at the same time as other local elections across England. 12 of the 39 seats of the council were up for election.

The council remained under Liberal Democrat majority control. Despite the Green Party newly fielding candidates in nearly every ward, ultimately this had little impact on the council's results. Every single seat up for election was held by its incumbent party, meaning no seats changed hands.

Borough of Eastleigh Council's composition after the 2024 local elections

== Results summary ==
2024 Eastleigh Borough Council election (totals summed across all 12 wards' declarations).
Party	This election				Full council			This election		
Party	Candidates	Seats	Net	Seats %	Other	Total	Total %	Votes	Votes %	+/−
Liberal Democrats	{{{candidates}}}	10	Steady	83.3	25	35	89.7	14,205	47.7	+3.0
Independent	{{{candidates}}}	1	Steady	8.3	2	3	7.7	1,995	6.7	+1.2
Conservative	{{{candidates}}}	1	Steady	8.3	0	1	2.6	7,425	24.9	-11.3
Labour	{{{candidates}}}	0	Steady	0.0	0	0	0.0	3,456	11.6	+0.3
Green	{{{candidates}}}	0	Steady	0.0	0	0	0.0	2,279	7.7	+6.0
Reform	{{{candidates}}}	0	Steady	0.0	0	0	0.0	412	1.4	+1.2

== Ward results ==
=== Bishopstoke ===
Bishopstoke
Party	Candidate	Votes	%	±%
Independent	Gin Tidridge	1,659	56.1	+6.8
Liberal Democrats	Anne Winstanley	716	24.2	−4.0
Conservative	Ben Burcombe-Filer	293	9.9	+0.8
Labour	Christian Brookes	288	9.7	+1.4
Majority		943	31.9	
Turnout		2,966	35.82	
Independent hold		Swing		

=== Botley ===
Botley
Party	Candidate	Votes	%	±%
Liberal Democrats	David Kinloch	1,146	63.1	+3.7
Conservative	Joy Haythorne	480	26.4	−4.5
Green	Anna-Belle Skinner	190	10.5	N/A
Majority		666	36.7	
Turnout		1,830	30.57	
Liberal Democrats hold		Swing		

=== Bursledon & Hound North ===
Bursledon & Hound North
Party	Candidate	Votes	%	±%
Liberal Democrats	Steve Holes	1,332	67.4	−5.4
Conservative	Nick Arnold	380	19.2	+0.4
Labour	Andrew Merewether-Helps	161	8.2	−0.2
Green	Katie Court	102	5.2	N/A
Majority		952	48.2	
Turnout		1,986	26.26	
Liberal Democrats hold		Swing		

=== Chandler's Ford ===
Chandler's Ford
Party	Candidate	Votes	%	±%
Liberal Democrats	David Pragnell	1,429	50.2	−8.0
Conservative	Shelagh Lee	906	31.8	−0.9
Labour	Zak Southward	273	9.6	+0.5
Green	Nathaniel Joyce	241	8.5	N/A
Majority		523	18.4	
Turnout		2,881	35.50	
Liberal Democrats hold		Swing		

=== Eastleigh Central ===
Eastleigh Central
Party	Candidate	Votes	%	±%
Liberal Democrats	Wayne Irish	866	37.4	−7.8
Labour Co-op	Josh Constable	774	33.4	+5.2
Conservative	Yogesh Saxena	319	13.8	−2.0
Reform	Alexander Culley	184	7.9	N/A
Green	Jack Stapleton	175	7.5	−3.3
Majority		92	4.0	
Turnout		2,329	31.03	
Liberal Democrats hold		Swing		

=== Eastleigh North ===
Eastleigh North
Party	Candidate	Votes	%	±%
Liberal Democrats	Tanya Park	948	45.6	−8.2
Conservative	Carl Hunter	503	24.2	−2.2
Labour	Sarah Jutsum	384	18.5	−1.3
Green	Ryan Elger	243	11.7	N/A
Majority		445	21.4	
Turnout		2,091	29.05	
Liberal Democrats hold		Swing		

=== Eastleigh South ===
Eastleigh South
Party	Candidate	Votes	%	±%
Liberal Democrats	Alex Bourne	905	46.5	−3.9
Labour	Steve Phillips	397	20.4	+1.1
Conservative	Roger Vivian	241	12.4	−4.9
Reform	Clare Fawcett	228	11.7	+8.2
Green	Natalie Roebuck	175	9.0	−0.5
Majority		508	26.1	
Turnout		1,958	23.95	
Liberal Democrats hold		Swing		

=== Fair Oak & Horton Heath ===
Fair Oak & Horton Heath
Party	Candidate	Votes	%	±%
Conservative	Steve Broomfield	1,520	48.5	+13.4
Liberal Democrats	Rico Clay	1,025	32.7	−7.8
Green	Ben Parry	329	10.5	−5.3
Labour	Alison Phillips	262	8.4	−0.2
Majority		495	15.8	
Turnout		3,149	35.69	
Conservative hold		Swing		

=== Hamble & Netley ===
Hamble & Netley
Party	Candidate	Votes	%	±%
Liberal Democrats	Malcolm Cross	1,509	58.8	+4.7
Conservative	Steph Arnold	382	14.9	−0.9
Independent	Simon Hand	336	13.1	−2.8
Green	Phil Horton	174	6.8	−0.9
Labour	Geoff Kosted	167	6.5	±0.0
Majority		1,127	43.9	
Turnout		2,582	32.45	
Liberal Democrats hold		Swing		

=== Hedge End North ===
Hedge End North
Party	Candidate	Votes	%	±%
Liberal Democrats	Derek Pretty	1,105	56.0	+0.5
Conservative	Chris Yates	393	19.9	−3.7
Labour	Geoff Budd	290	14.7	+1.9
Green	Glynn Fleming	185	9.4	+1.3
Majority		712	36.1	
Turnout		1,987	26.59	
Liberal Democrats hold		Swing		

=== Hedge End South ===
Hedge End South
Party	Candidate	Votes	%	±%
Liberal Democrats	Keith House	1,436	53.1	−4.5
Conservative	Jerry Hall	801	29.6	+2.5
Labour	Keith Day	295	10.9	+2.8
Green	Geoff Skinner	172	6.4	−0.8
Majority		635	23.5	
Turnout		2,725	32.07	
Liberal Democrats hold		Swing		

=== Hiltingbury ===
Hiltingbury
Party	Candidate	Votes	%	±%
Liberal Democrats	Karl Attrill	1,788	51.8	−5.3
Conservative	Albie Slawson	1,207	35.0	+3.9
Green	Rich House	293	8.5	+0.8
Labour	Alastair Dilworth	165	4.8	+0.7
Majority		581	16.8	
Turnout		3,475	42.84	
Liberal Democrats hold		Swing		

== Changes 2024–2026 ==
George Baker (Liberal Democrats, Chandler's Ford) had not attended a council meeting since 12 June 2025 because of a recurring medical condition. In November 2025, the Administration Committee granted him a dispensation from the six-month attendance rule until 28 February 2026. The council subsequently issued a notice of vacancy for Chandler's Ford on 18 March 2026; the vacancy was filled at the 2026 election alongside the ward's ordinary seat.

Liberal Democrat councillor Cynthia Garton died on 2 May 2026, triggering a by-election in Hedge End South after the 2026 election.

=== By-elections ===
==== Hamble & Netley ====
Hamble & Netley by-election: 6 March 2025
Party	Candidate	Votes	%	±%
Liberal Democrats	Prad Bains	1,224	52.1	–6.7
Reform	Russ Kitching	542	23.1	N/A
Conservative	Marley Guthrie	421	17.9	+3.0
Labour	Chris Rogers	164	7.0	+0.5
Majority		682	29.0	–14.9
Turnout		2,353	29.3	–3.2
Registered electors		8,039		
Liberal Democrats hold				

The Hamble & Netley by-election was triggered by the resignation of councillor Liz Jarvis, who had been elected as the Member of Parliament for Eastleigh at the 2024 United Kingdom general election.

==== Eastleigh Central ====
Eastleigh Central by-election: 8 May 2025
Party	Candidate	Votes	%	±%
Liberal Democrats	Mark Andrew Harding	1,020	46.6	+9.2
Reform	Sukhdev Raj	611	27.9	+20.0
Conservative	Albie Slawson	149	6.8	−7.0
Labour	Zak Southward	319	14.6	−18.8
Independent	Venkhata Priya Varadharajan	90	4.1	N/A
Majority		409	18.7	
Turnout		2,195	28.87	
Registered electors		7,602		
Liberal Democrats hold				

The Eastleigh Central by-election was triggered by the resignation of councillor Bhavin Dedhia.

==== Hedge End South ====
Hedge End South: 22 May 2025
Party	Candidate	Votes	%	±%
Liberal Democrats	John Shepherd	1,266	44.4	−8.7
Conservative	Jerry Hall	735	25.8	−3.8
Reform	Craig Palmer	728	25.5	N/A
Labour	Keith Day	122	4.3	−6.6
Majority		531	18.6	
Turnout		2,859	33.3	
Registered electors		8,589		
Liberal Democrats hold				

The Hedge End South by-election was triggered by the death of long-serving councillor and former mayor Jane Welsh.

== See also ==
- Eastleigh Borough Council elections
