= 2002 Eastleigh Borough Council election =

2002 UK local government election

Map of the results

Elections to Eastleigh Council were held on 2 May 2002. The whole council was up for election with boundary changes since the last election in 2000. The Liberal Democrat party kept overall control of the council.

== Election result ==
Eastleigh local election result 2002
| Party | Seats | Gains | Losses | Net gain/loss | Seats % | Votes % | Votes | +/− |
|---|---|---|---|---|---|---|---|---|
| Liberal Democrats | 31 | | | +2 | 70.5 | 48.8 | 34,920 | |
| Conservative | 9 | | | 0 | 20.5 | 32.0 | 22,909 | |
| Labour | 4 | | | -2 | 9.1 | 18.8 | 13,429 | |
| UKIP | 0 | | | 0 | 0 | 0.4 | 257 | |
| Independent | 0 | | | 0 | 0 | 0.1 | 87 | |

== Ward results ==
Bishopstoke East (2)
| Party | Candidate | Votes | % | ±% |
|---|---|---|---|---|
| Liberal Democrats | Trevor Mignot | 795 | | |
| Liberal Democrats | Angela Roling | 702 | | |
| Labour | Mary Shepherd | 330 | | |
| Labour | Gwendoline Borrill | 322 | | |
| Conservative | Anthony Blackman | 274 | | |
| Conservative | John Milne | 271 | | |
| Turnout | | 2,694 | 32.2 | |

Bishopstoke West (2)
| Party | Candidate | Votes | % | ±% |
|---|---|---|---|---|
| Liberal Democrats | Anne Winstanley | 888 | | |
| Liberal Democrats | Andrew Moore | 792 | | |
| Labour | Susan Toher | 731 | | |
| Labour | Ian Pemberton | 658 | | |
| Conservative | Eveline Milne | 189 | | |
| Conservative | Simon Winter | 186 | | |
| Turnout | | 3,444 | 42.6 | |

Botley (2)
| Party | Candidate | Votes | % | ±% |
|---|---|---|---|---|
| Liberal Democrats | Catherine Fraser | 783 | | |
| Liberal Democrats | Rupert Kyrle | 762 | | |
| Conservative | Andrew Gardiner | 556 | | |
| Conservative | Susan Hall | 554 | | |
| Labour | David Hewitt | 146 | | |
| Labour | Beth Richards | 137 | | |
| Turnout | | 2,938 | 37.8 | |

Bursledon & Old Netley (3)
| Party | Candidate | Votes | % | ±% |
|---|---|---|---|---|
| Liberal Democrats | Hugh Millar | 972 | | |
| Liberal Democrats | Julie Davis | 956 | | |
| Liberal Democrats | Antonia Craig | 931 | | |
| Conservative | Heather Moneypenny | 715 | | |
| Conservative | Ronald Bramhall | 642 | | |
| Conservative | Alan Holt | 630 | | |
| Labour | Rodney Commins | 185 | | |
| Labour | James Miller | 142 | | |
| Labour | Elsie Truscott | 131 | | |
| Turnout | | 5,304 | 33.4 | |

Chandler's Ford East (2)
| Party | Candidate | Votes | % | ±% |
|---|---|---|---|---|
| Conservative | Michael Hughes | 724 | | |
| Conservative | Ernest Pullen | 700 | | |
| Liberal Democrats | William Furness | 523 | | |
| Liberal Democrats | Colin Bull | 504 | | |
| Labour | Neil Cornmell | 178 | | |
| Labour | John Howells | 153 | | |
| UKIP | Ann Bays | 44 | | |
| Turnout | | 2,826 | 38.9 | |

Chandler's Ford West (2)
| Party | Candidate | Votes | % | ±% |
|---|---|---|---|---|
| Liberal Democrats | Alan Broadhurst | 840 | | |
| Liberal Democrats | Andrew Wray | 832 | | |
| Conservative | Barry Light | 600 | | |
| Conservative | Ronald Ashton | 577 | | |
| Labour | Graham Joslin | 156 | | |
| Labour | Philip Grice | 155 | | |
| Turnout | | 3,160 | 39.2 | |

Eastleigh Central (3)
| Party | Candidate | Votes | % | ±% |
|---|---|---|---|---|
| Liberal Democrats | Wayne Irish | 937 | | |
| Liberal Democrats | Glynn Davies-Dear | 913 | | |
| Labour | William Luffman | 892 | | |
| Liberal Democrats | Steven Sollitt | 887 | | |
| Labour | Christine Hadley | 853 | | |
| Labour | Christopher Abraham | 814 | | |
| Conservative | Nick Arnold | 153 | | |
| Conservative | Anne Ingram | 134 | | |
| Conservative | Richard Hall | 128 | | |
| Independent | Alan Sneddon | 87 | | |
| UKIP | Timothy Cuell | 79 | | |
| Turnout | | 5,877 | 33.3 | |

Eastleigh North (3)
| Party | Candidate | Votes | % | ±% |
|---|---|---|---|---|
| Liberal Democrats | Maureen Sollitt | 958 | | |
| Liberal Democrats | Christopher Thomas | 899 | | |
| Liberal Democrats | Peter Wall | 849 | | |
| Labour | Sharon Saunders | 630 | | |
| Labour | Barry Saunders | 596 | | |
| Labour | Lynda Ayres | 580 | | |
| Conservative | Minna Ashton | 421 | | |
| Conservative | Kenneth Tyson | 372 | | |
| Conservative | John Milne | 347 | | |
| Turnout | | 5,652 | 32.7 | |

Eastleigh South (3)
| Party | Candidate | Votes | % | ±% |
|---|---|---|---|---|
| Labour | Peter Luffman | 1,007 | | |
| Labour | Marilyn Birks | 959 | | |
| Labour | Gillian Connell | 929 | | |
| Liberal Democrats | Adam Johnson | 598 | | |
| Liberal Democrats | Julie Tompkins | 571 | | |
| Liberal Democrats | Daniel Wright | 556 | | |
| Conservative | Jacqueline Welch | 237 | | |
| Conservative | Margaret Palmer | 234 | | |
| Conservative | Paul Elswood | 229 | | |
| UKIP | Stephen Challis | 73 | | |
| Turnout | | 5,393 | 31.9 | |

Fair Oak & Horton Heath (3)
| Party | Candidate | Votes | % | ±% |
|---|---|---|---|---|
| Liberal Democrats | Philip Spearey | 1,208 | | |
| Liberal Democrats | Eleanor Unsted | 1,117 | | |
| Liberal Democrats | Roger Smith | 1,116 | | |
| Conservative | Steven Broomfield | 611 | | |
| Conservative | Martin Briggs | 522 | | |
| Conservative | Ronnie Grassie | 496 | | |
| Labour | John Sorley | 190 | | |
| Labour | Berenice Bowles | 183 | | |
| Labour | John Bowles | 182 | | |
| Turnout | | 5,625 | 30.6 | |

Hamble-le-Rice & Butlocks Heath (2)
| Party | Candidate | Votes | % | ±% |
|---|---|---|---|---|
| Conservative | William Pepper | 821 | | |
| Conservative | Bernie Wright | 708 | | |
| Liberal Democrats | Malcolm Cross | 676 | | |
| Liberal Democrats | David Collingwood | 659 | | |
| Labour | Christine Hammond | 114 | | |
| Labour | Terry Hammond | 114 | | |
| UKIP | Beryl Humphrey | 61 | | |
| Turnout | | 3,153 | 40.0 | |

Hedge End St Johns (3)
| Party | Candidate | Votes | % | ±% |
|---|---|---|---|---|
| Conservative | Jerry Hall | 986 | | |
| Liberal Democrats | Jane Welsh | 942 | | |
| Liberal Democrats | June Hughes | 926 | | |
| Conservative | Anthony Roberts | 911 | | |
| Liberal Democrats | David Thomas | 862 | | |
| Conservative | Debra Aldridge | 759 | | |
| Labour | Paul Christopher | 206 | | |
| Labour | Geoffrey Kosted | 206 | | |
| Labour | Philip White | 189 | | |
| Turnout | | 5,987 | 35.5 | |

Hedge End Grange Park (2)
| Party | Candidate | Votes | % | ±% |
|---|---|---|---|---|
| Liberal Democrats | Louise Bloom | 750 | | |
| Liberal Democrats | Derek Pretty | 695 | | |
| Conservative | Paul Philp | 526 | | |
| Conservative | Simon Hill | 457 | | |
| Turnout | | 2,428 | 31.1 | |

Hedge End Wildern (2)
| Party | Candidate | Votes | % | ±% |
|---|---|---|---|---|
| Liberal Democrats | Keith House | 704 | | |
| Liberal Democrats | Sharon Mintoff | 641 | | |
| Conservative | Michael McKay | 299 | | |
| Conservative | Amerik Kooner | 204 | | |
| Labour | Frank Blake | 120 | | |
| Labour | Francis Vickers | 96 | | |
| Turnout | | 2,064 | 26.3 | |

Hiltingbury East (2)
| Party | Candidate | Votes | % | ±% |
|---|---|---|---|---|
| Conservative | John Caldwell | 1,259 | | |
| Conservative | Godfrey Olson | 1,223 | | |
| Liberal Democrats | Pamela Holden-Brown | 705 | | |
| Liberal Democrats | Haulwen Broadhurst | 599 | | |
| Labour | Gwyneth Hubert | 137 | | |
| Labour | Michael Tibble | 112 | | |
| Turnout | | 4,035 | 51.2 | |

Hiltingbury West (2)
| Party | Candidate | Votes | % | ±% |
|---|---|---|---|---|
| Conservative | Colin Davidovitz | 1,000 | | |
| Conservative | Doreen Wllfare | 869 | | |
| Liberal Democrats | Grahame Smith | 840 | | |
| Liberal Democrats | Margaret Kyrle | 832 | | |
| Labour | Beryl Addison | 88 | | |
| Labour | Kevin Butt | 72 | | |
| Turnout | | 3,701 | 48.5 | |

Netley Abbey (2)
| Party | Candidate | Votes | % | ±% |
|---|---|---|---|---|
| Liberal Democrats | David Airey | 874 | | |
| Liberal Democrats | George Wintle | 746 | | |
| Conservative | Sophie Harris | 273 | | |
| Conservative | Peter Madsen | 254 | | |
| Labour | Moira Cam | 223 | | |
| Labour | Matthew Crocker | 181 | | |
| Turnout | | 2,551 | 32.9 | |

West End North (2)
| Party | Candidate | Votes | % | ±% |
|---|---|---|---|---|
| Liberal Democrats | Carol Boulton | 613 | | |
| Liberal Democrats | Martin Kyrle | 593 | | |
| Conservative | Patricia Wiggins | 467 | | |
| Conservative | Roger Cathery | 425 | | |
| Labour | Norman Hart | 166 | | |
| Turnout | | 2,264 | 31.3 | |

West End South (2)
| Party | Candidate | Votes | % | ±% |
|---|---|---|---|---|
| Liberal Democrats | Peter Humphreys | 697 | | |
| Liberal Democrats | David Goodall | 677 | | |
| Conservative | Neville Dickinson | 487 | | |
| Conservative | Colin Murphy | 479 | | |
| Labour | Nancy Smith | 166 | | |
| Turnout | | 2,506 | 30.1 | |
