= Keith House (politician) =

British politician

Keith House is Liberal Democrat politician who has led Eastleigh Borough Council since 1994. He retained his council seat for Hedge End South in the 2024 Eastleigh Borough Council election, held on 2 May.

In 2014 Keith was appointed with Natalie Elphicke to jointly chair an independent review of the role of local authorities in relation to the housing supply. Announced in the 2013 Autumn Statement, the remit included the restriction that any proposals should not involve breaching the Housing Revenue Account borrowing cap. It involved canvassing the views of over 400 organisations up and down the country. The review entitled From statutory provider to Housing Delivery Enabler: Review into the local authority role in housing supply was published on 27 January 2015.
