= 2023 Eastleigh Borough Council election =

2023 English local election

- 4 May 2023

13 of 39 seats on Eastleigh Borough Council 20 seats needed for a majority

	First party	Second party	Third party
Leader	Keith House	Louise Parker-Jones	Steve Broomfield
Party	Liberal Democrats	Independent	Conservative
Last election	34	4	1
Seats before	34	4	1
Seats after	35	3	1
Seat change	▲1	▼1	Steady
- Map of the results
Leader before election
Keith House
Liberal Democrats
Leader after election
Keith House
Liberal Democrats

The 2023 Eastleigh Borough Council election took place on 4 May 2023, to elect 13 members (one-third) of Eastleigh Borough Council in Hampshire, England.

== Results summary ==
Following the results, the council remained under Liberal Democrat control.

2023 Eastleigh Borough Council election
Party	Seats won	Change	Seats overall
Liberal Democrats	12	▲1	35
Independents and Others	1	▼1	3
Conservative Party	0	Steady	1

== Ward results ==
=== Bishopstoke ===
Bishopstoke
Party	Candidate	Votes	%	±%
Independent	Karen Caws	1,544	49.3	−6.9
Liberal Democrats	Anne Winstanley	884	28.2	+4.2
Conservative	Robert Yates	285	9.1	−2.9
Labour	Victoria White	260	8.3	+0.4
Independent	Gary Chaffey	159	5.1	N/A
Majority		660	21.1	
Turnout		3,132	37.8	
Independent hold		Swing	-5.5	

=== Bursledon & Hound North ===
Bursledon & Hound North
Party	Candidate	Votes	%	±%
Liberal Democrats	Jane O'Sullivan	1,517	72.8	+6.3
Conservative	Stephanie Arnold	391	18.8	−4.8
Labour	Jacob Phillips	175	8.4	−1.5
Majority		1,126	54.0	
Turnout		2,083	28.0	
Liberal Democrats hold		Swing	5.5	

=== Chandler's Ford ===
Chandler's Ford
Party	Candidate	Votes	%	±%
Liberal Democrats	George Baker	1,769	58.2	+3.2
Conservative	Shelagh Lee	992	32.7	+1.5
Labour	Kathy O'Neill	276	9.1	+3.4
Majority		777	25.5	
Turnout		3,037	37.3	
Liberal Democrats hold		Swing	0.8	

=== Eastleigh Central ===
Eastleigh Central
Party	Candidate	Votes	%	±%
Liberal Democrats	Bhavin Dedhia	979	45.2	+13.1
Labour Co-op	Josh Constable	610	28.2	+3.2
Conservative	Douglas Fox	342	15.8	−0.6
Green	Jack Stapleton	234	10.8	+4.7
Majority		369	17.0	
Turnout		2,165	29.2	
Liberal Democrats hold		Swing	4.9	

=== Eastleigh North ===
Eastleigh North
Party	Candidate	Votes	%	±%
Liberal Democrats	Rosemary Reynolds	1,213	53.8	+9.3
Conservative	Carl Hunter	594	26.4	−3.2
Labour	Sarah Jutsum	446	19.8	+4.1
Majority		619	27.5	
Turnout		2,253	31.8	
Liberal Democrats hold		Swing	6.2	

Cllr Tyson-Payne, who had held the seat as a Liberal Democrat since 2019, resigned the Liberal Democrat whip on 31 March 2021 and sat the remainder of her term as an independent (see 2019 Eastleigh Borough Council election#Changes 2019–2021), but did not stand for re-election in 2023. As the seat was last won by the Liberal Democrats, Reynolds' win is recorded as a hold rather than a gain.

=== Eastleigh South ===
Eastleigh South
Party	Candidate	Votes	%	±%
Liberal Democrats	Darshan Mann	1,008	50.4	−2.2
Labour	Steve Phillips	386	19.3	+1.4
Conservative	Nicholas Arnold	346	17.3	+7.7
Green	Natalie Roebuck	189	9.5	−10.4
Reform	Clare Fawcett	70	3.5	N/A
Majority		622	31.1	
Turnout		1,999	24.8	
Liberal Democrats hold		Swing	-1.8	

=== Fair Oak & Horton Heath ===
Fair Oak & Horton Heath
Party	Candidate	Votes	%	±%
Liberal Democrats	Michelle Marsh	1,286	40.5	−2.0
Conservative	Benjamin Burcombe-Filer	1,114	35.1	−2.8
Green	Ben Parry	500	15.8	+2.9
Labour	Margaret Ashton	274	8.6	+1.9
Majority		172	5.4	
Turnout		3,174	36.6	
Liberal Democrats hold		Swing	0.4	

=== Hamble & Netley ===
Hamble & Netley
Party	Candidate	Votes	%	±%
Liberal Democrats	Alison Holland	1,523	54.1	−8.7
Independent	Simon Hand	447	15.9	N/A
Conservative	Jeanette Fox	445	15.8	−10.8
Green	Phil Horton	216	7.7	+3.2
Labour	Alison Phillips	182	6.5	+0.4
Majority		1,076	38.2	
Turnout		2,814	35.4	
Liberal Democrats hold		Swing	N/A	

=== Hedge End North ===
Hedge End North
Party	Candidate	Votes	%	±%
Liberal Democrats	Ian Corben	1,202	55.5	−1.7
Conservative	Paul Redding	510	23.6	−1.0
Labour	Geoff Budd	277	12.8	+3.2
Green	Glynn Fleming	175	8.1	−0.5
Majority		692	32.0	
Turnout		2,164	29.3	
Liberal Democrats hold		Swing	-0.3	

=== Hedge End South ===
Hedge End South
Party	Candidate	Votes	%	±%
Liberal Democrats	Cynthia Garton	1,651	57.6	−6.0
Conservative	Christopher Yates	778	27.2	−1.2
Labour	Keith Day	231	8.1	±0.0
Green	Geoff Skinner	205	7.2	N/A
Majority		873	30.5	
Turnout		2,866	33.8	
Liberal Democrats hold		Swing	-2.4	

=== Hiltingbury ===
Hiltingbury
Party	Candidate	Votes	%	±%
Liberal Democrats	James Duguid	2,039	57.1	+0.6
Conservative	Albie Slawson	1,111	31.1	−7.4
Green	Rich House	275	7.7	N/A
Labour	Emma Robinson	145	4.1	−0.9
Majority		928	26.0	
Turnout		3,572	44.4	
Liberal Democrats hold		Swing	4.0	

=== West End North ===
West End North
Party	Candidate	Votes	%	±%
Liberal Democrats	Richard Gomer	847	56.9	+4.5
Conservative	Anna Linsdell	398	26.7	−2.0
Green	Tracy Weeks	136	9.1	−3.4
Labour	Geoff Kosted	97	6.5	±0.0
TUSC	Neil Henry	11	0.7	N/A
Majority		449	30.2	
Turnout		1,489	32.1	
Liberal Democrats hold		Swing	3.2	

=== West End South ===
West End South
Party	Candidate	Votes	%	±%
Liberal Democrats	Barry Du-Crow	876	54.3	+2.2
Conservative	Jerry Hall	493	30.5	−3.2
Labour	Steve Willoughby	143	8.9	−0.5
Green	Dave Waghorn	102	6.3	N/A
Majority		383	23.7	
Turnout		1,614	33.5	
Liberal Democrats hold		Swing	2.7	
