= 2022 Eastleigh Borough Council election =

2022 UK local government election

- 5 May 2022

14 of 39 seats to Eastleigh Borough Council 20 seats needed for a majority
	First party	Second party	Third party
Leader	Keith House	Louise Parker-Jones	Margaret Atkinson
Party	Liberal Democrats	Independent	Conservative
Leader's seat	Hedge End South	Bishopstoke	Hiltingbury (defeated)
Last election	32	5	2
Seats before	32	5	2
Seats won	13	1	0
Seats after	34	4	1
Seat change	▲2	▼1	▼1
Popular vote	18,266	2,210	9,722
Percentage	50.9%	6.2%	27.1%
- Results by ward in 2022. White denotes no election held in this ward this year
Council control before election
Liberal Democrats
Council control after election
Liberal Democrats

Map of the results

The 2022 Eastleigh Borough Council election took place on 5 May 2022 to elect councillors to Eastleigh Borough Council.

== Results summary ==
2022 Eastleigh Borough Council election (totals summed across all 14 wards' declarations; corrects a Green Party candidate omitted from the ward-level results, see West End South below).
Party	This election			Full council			This election		
Party	Seats	Net	Seats %	Other	Total	Total %	Votes	Votes %	+/−
Liberal Democrats	13	▲2	92.9	21	34	87.2	18,266	50.9	+7.0
Independent	1	▼1	7.1	3	4	10.3	2,210	6.2	+0.6
Conservative	0	▼1	0.0	1	1	2.6	9,722	27.1	-9.3
Labour	0	Steady	0.0	0	0	0.0	3,464	9.7	-1.7
Green	0	Steady	0.0	0	0	0.0	2,125	5.9	+4.0
Reform	0	Steady	0.0	0	0	0.0	70	0.2	±0.0

== Ward results ==
=== Bishopstoke ===
Bishopstoke
Party	Candidate	Votes	%	±%
Independent	Louise Parker-Jones	1,826	56.2	+9.9
Liberal Democrats	Anne Winstanley	780	24.0	−2.0
Conservative	Jeanette Fox	389	12.0	−7.5
Labour	Victoria Rick	256	7.9	+0.7
Majority		1,046	32.2	
Turnout		3,256	38.7	
Independent hold		Swing	▲6.0	

=== Botley ===
Botley
Party	Candidate	Votes	%	±%
Liberal Democrats	Rupert Kyrle	1,129	59.4	+10.7
Conservative	Joy Haythorne	587	30.9	−12.0
Labour	Kevin Williamson	184	9.7	+1.4
Majority		542	28.5	
Turnout		1,912	36.1	
Liberal Democrats hold		Swing	▲11.4	

=== Bursledon & Hound North ===
Bursledon & Hound North
Party	Candidate	Votes	%	±%
Liberal Democrats	Tonia Craig	1,449	66.5	+5.9
Conservative	Chris Yates	515	23.6	−6.8
Labour	Eileen Marks	215	9.9	+0.8
Majority		934	42.9	
Turnout		2,188	29.3	
Liberal Democrats hold		Swing	▲6.4	

=== Chandler's Ford ===
Chandler's Ford
Party	Candidate	Votes	%	±%
Liberal Democrats	Alan Broadhurst	1,738	55.0	+5.2
Conservative	Shelagh Lee	987	31.2	−10.3
Green	Natasha Corney	256	8.1	N/A
Labour	Gavin Ellys	181	5.7	−3.0
Majority		751	23.8	
Turnout		3,182	38.2	
Liberal Democrats hold		Swing	▲7.8	

=== Eastleigh Central ===
Eastleigh Central
Party	Candidate	Votes	%	±%
Liberal Democrats	Cameron Spencer	716	32.1	−5.0
Labour Co-op	Josh Constable	557	25.0	−3.9
Independent	Tina Campbell	384	17.2	N/A
Conservative	Simon Payne	365	16.4	−8.4
Green	Jack Stapleton	136	6.1	N/A
Reform	Clare Fawcett	70	3.1	−0.4
Majority		159	7.1	
Turnout		2,239	29.6	
Liberal Democrats hold		Swing	▼0.6	

Cllr Campbell had held the seat as a Liberal Democrat since 2018, resigning the Liberal Democrat whip on 30 March 2021 to sit the remainder of her term as an independent (see 2019 Eastleigh Borough Council election#Changes 2019–2021); as the seat was last won by the Liberal Democrats, Spencer's win is recorded as a hold rather than a gain.

=== Eastleigh North ===
Eastleigh North
Party	Candidate	Votes	%	±%
Liberal Democrats	Stephen Beer	1,052	44.5	+0.2
Conservative	Lisa Crosher	699	29.6	−7.4
Labour	Kathy O'Neill	372	15.7	−3.0
Green	Jason Reeves	240	10.2	N/A
Majority		353	14.9	
Turnout		2,371	32.6	
Liberal Democrats hold		Swing	▲3.8	

=== Eastleigh South ===
Eastleigh South
Party	Candidate	Votes	%	±%
Liberal Democrats	Paul Bicknell	1,156	52.6	+10.0
Green	Laura Palin	436	19.9	N/A
Labour	Steve Phillips	393	17.9	−8.3
Conservative	Nicholas Arnold	211	9.6	−21.6
Majority		720	32.8	
Turnout		2,213	27.5	
Liberal Democrats hold		Swing	N/A	

=== Fair Oak & Horton Heath ===
Fair Oak & Horton Heath
Party	Candidate	Votes	%	±%
Liberal Democrats	Nick Couldrey	1,370	42.5	+13.0
Conservative	Benjamin Burcombe-Filer	1,223	37.9	−10.1
Green	Paul Openshaw	417	12.9	+2.1
Labour	Carol Rowe	217	6.7	+1.7
Majority		147	4.6	
Turnout		3,237	37.8	
Liberal Democrats hold		Swing	▲11.6	

=== Hamble & Netley ===
Hamble & Netley
Party	Candidate	Votes	%	±%
Liberal Democrats	Liz Jarvis	1,809	62.8	+6.9
Conservative	Susan Hall	768	26.6	−5.9
Labour	Emma Robinson	175	6.1	−5.5
Green	Phil Horton	130	4.5	N/A
Majority		1,041	36.1	
Turnout		2,892	36.2	
Liberal Democrats hold		Swing	▲6.4	

=== Hedge End North ===
Hedge End North
Party	Candidate	Votes	%	±%
Liberal Democrats	Leigh Hadaway	1,283	57.2	+8.0
Conservative	Paul Redding	551	24.6	−10.0
Labour	Alison Phillips	215	9.6	+2.0
Green	Glynn Fleming	194	8.6	−0.1
Majority		732	32.6	
Turnout		2,252	30.1	
Liberal Democrats hold		Swing	▲9.0	

=== Hedge End South ===
Hedge End South
Party	Candidate	Votes	%	±%
Liberal Democrats	Jane Welsh	1,921	63.6	+11.7
Conservative	Mark Banks	854	28.3	−12.9
Labour	Geoff Kosted	245	8.1	+1.2
Majority		1,067	35.3	
Turnout		3,028	35.3	
Liberal Democrats hold		Swing	▲12.3	

=== Hiltingbury ===
Hiltingbury
Party	Candidate	Votes	%	±%
Liberal Democrats	Maud Attrill	2,086	56.5	+8.5
Conservative	Margaret Atkinson	1,424	38.5	−6.8
Labour	Kevin Butt	184	5.0	−1.7
Majority		662	17.9	
Turnout		3,714	45.7	
Liberal Democrats gain from Conservative		Swing	▲7.7	

=== West End North ===
West End North
Party	Candidate	Votes	%	±%
Liberal Democrats	Bruce Tennent	898	52.4	−7.2
Conservative	Roger Vivian	492	28.7	+10.3
Green	Ben Parry	214	12.5	+4.1
Labour	Maggie Ashton	111	6.5	+2.4
Majority		406	23.7	
Turnout		1,722	37.5	
Liberal Democrats hold		Swing	▼8.8	

=== West End South ===
West End South
Party	Candidate	Votes	%	±%
Liberal Democrats	Janice Asman	879	48.9	−4.6
Conservative	Jerry Hall	657	36.6	+17.3
Labour	Steve Willoughby	159	8.8	+3.8
Green	Tracy Weeks	102	5.7	N/A
Majority		222	12.4	
Turnout		1,811	36.9	
Liberal Democrats hold		Swing	▼11.0	
