= 2015 Eastleigh Borough Council election =

2015 UK local government election

Map of the results

The 2015 Eastleigh Borough Council election took place on 7 May 2015 to elect 14, approximately one third of the members of Eastleigh Borough Council in England as one of the English local elections coinciding with the 2015 General Election. The local authority holds its elections in three years out of four ('by thirds').

== Results ==
Liberal Democrats maintained their majority group, slightly reduced by two councillors to hold 38 of the 44 councillors across its 14 wards. The gains were of two seats to Conservatives and no other seats changed hands.

Eastleigh Borough Council Election, 2015
Party	Seats	Gains	Losses	Net gain/loss	Seats %	Votes %	Votes	+/−
Liberal Democrats	38	0	0	0	86	37	19381	
Conservative	6	2	0	+2	14	30	15901	
UKIP	0	0	0	0	0	18	9555	
Labour	0	0	0	0	0	12	6178	
Green	0	0	0	0	0	3	1440	
Independent	0	0	0	0	0	0.2	127	
TUSC	0	0	0	0	0	0.1	42	

=== Ward by ward ===
Bishopstoke East
Party	Candidate	Votes	%	±%
Liberal Democrats	ROLING, Angela	1215		
Conservative	YATES, Tom	760		
UKIP	EDWARDS, John Peter	747		
Labour	SHEPHARD, Mary	325		
Green	WATERMAN, Ania	118		
Majority				
Liberal Democrats hold		Swing		

Bishopstoke West
Party	Candidate	Votes	%	±%
Liberal Democrats	PARKINSON-MACLACHLAN, Vickieye	1027		
UKIP	WELLER, Jan	629		
Conservative	JENKS, Georgina Alice	588		
Labour	TOHER, Sue	538		
Green	PEARSON, Sarah	223		
Majority				
Liberal Democrats hold		Swing		

Bursledon & Old Netley
Party	Candidate	Votes	%	±%
Liberal Democrats	CRAIG, Tonia	1443		
Conservative	BURGESS, Frair Louise	1403		
UKIP	EVANS, Denise Janet	645		
Labour	ROGERS, Chris	370		
Majority				
Liberal Democrats hold		Swing		

Eastleigh Central
Party	Candidate	Votes	%	±%
Liberal Democrats	TRENCHARD, Keith Stanley	1743		
UKIP	MOORE, Andrew Roy	1103		
Conservative	GOODE, Michael	1034		
Labour	BARTER, Louise	929		
Green	HARDIMAN, James	292		
Majority				
Liberal Democrats hold		Swing		

Eastleigh North
Party	Candidate	Votes	%	±%
Liberal Democrats	BAIN, Sarah Louise	1578		
Conservative	ARNOLD, Nick	1066		
UKIP	DAVIES-DEAR, Glynn William	901		
Labour	GOODALL, Stephen	513		
Green	HARRIS, Imogen Susan	222		
TUSC	BABEY, Jack James	26		
Majority				
Liberal Democrats hold		Swing		

Sarah Bain later left the Liberal Democrats to sit as an independent councillor in August 2017.

Eastleigh South
Party	Candidate	Votes	%	±%
Liberal Democrats	BICKNELL, Paul	1378		
UKIP	SAUNDERS, Jim	1047		
Conservative	BRAIN, Dan	902		
Labour	PHILLIPS, Steve	787		
Green	COURTNEY, Susan	186		
TUSC	JUDD, Tanya Louise	16		
Majority				
Liberal Democrats hold		Swing		

Fair Oak and Horton Heath
Party	Candidate	Votes	%	±%
Liberal Democrats	SMITH, Roger Michael	1728		
Conservative	ATTERBURY, Colin George	1671		
Green	BARTON, Kylie	237		
UKIP	McGUINNESS, Hugh	1014		
Labour	MCKEONE, Christine	447		
Majority				
Liberal Democrats hold		Swing		

Hamble-Le-Rice and Butlocks Heath
Party	Candidate	Votes	%	±%
Conservative	LEAR, Elizabeth Kathleen	1306		
Liberal Democrats	CROSS, Malcom Robert	1275		
UKIP	NORTH, Richard Edward	394		
Labour	HUBERT, Gwyneth	247		
Majority				
Conservative gain from Liberal Democrats		Swing		

Hedge End Grange Park
Party	Candidate	Votes	%	±%
Liberal Democrats	PRETTY, Derek Roy	1649		
Conservative	GREENWOOD, Benjamin John	1512		
Labour	BUDD, Geoff	452		
UKIP	MARTIN, John Charles	408		
Majority				
Liberal Democrats hold		Swing		

Hedge End St Johns
Party	Candidate	Votes	%	±%
Conservative	HALL, Jerry	1932		
Liberal Democrats	WHEATLEY, Mick	1532		
UKIP	O'DONOGHUE, Michale	680		
Labour	ADDISON, Beryl	273		
Green	RUSHBY, Thomas William	162		
Majority				
Conservative gain from Liberal Democrats		Swing		

Hedge End Wildern
Party	Candidate	Votes	%	±%
Liberal Democrats	NORMAN, Emma Jayne	1183		
Conservative	REDDING, Paul Andrew	779		
UKIP	HOUSE, Pete	391		
Labour	HELPS, Andrew	336		
Independent	DAY, Keith Philip	127		
Majority				
Liberal Democrats hold		Swing		

Netley Abbey
Party	Candidate	Votes	%	±%
Liberal Democrats	VAN NIEKERK, Lizette	1219		
Conservative	QUEEN, Maureen Beryl	786		
UKIP	MARTIN, Chris	668		
Labour	MARKS, Eileen	291		
Majority				
Liberal Democrats hold		Swing		

West End North
Party	Candidate	Votes	%	±%
Liberal Democrats	NOYCE, Tony	1156		
Conservative	SYKES, Christine Edwina	1020		
UKIP	AGNEW, Tony	446		
Labour	WILLIAMSON, Kevin	280		
Majority				
Liberal Democrats hold		Swing		

West End South
Party	Candidate	Votes	%	±%
Liberal Democrats	BOULTON, Carol Ann	1255		
Conservative	DAVIES, Dai	1142		
UKIP	WEBBER, Paul	482		
Labour	SMITH, Nancy	390		
Majority				
Liberal Democrats hold		Swing		
