= 1998 Eastleigh Borough Council election =

1998 UK local government election

Elections to Eastleigh Council were held on 7 May 1998. One third of the council was up for election and the Liberal Democrat party kept overall control of the council.

After the election, the composition of the council was

- Liberal Democrat 29
- Labour 8
- Conservative 7

== Election result ==
Eastleigh local election result 1998
Party	Seats	Gains	Losses	Net gain/loss	Seats %	Votes %	Votes	+/−
Liberal Democrats	11			-1	78.6			
Conservative	2			0	14.3			
Labour	1			+1	7.1			
