= 2021 Eastleigh Borough Council election =

Council election

- 6 May 2021

12 of 39 seats to Eastleigh Borough Council 20 seats needed for a majority
	First party	Second party	Third party
Leader	Keith House	Louise Parker-Jones	Margaret Atkinson
Party	Liberal Democrats	Independent	Conservative
Leader's seat	Hedge End South	Bishopstoke	Hiltingbury (defeated)
Last election	34	3	2
Seats before	32	5	2
Seats won	10	1	1
Seats after	32	5	3
Seat change	Steady	Steady	Steady
- Results by ward in 2021. White denotes no election held in this ward this year
Council control before election
Liberal Democrats
Council control after election
Liberal Democrats

The 2021 Eastleigh Borough Council election took place on 6 May 2021 to elect 12 councillors to Eastleigh Borough Council. Every ward apart from the two member wards of West End North and West End South elected one councillor each. This took place at the same time as the elections for Hampshire County Council and the Hampshire Police and Crime Commissioner.

== Results summary ==
The Liberal Democrats and Conservatives each gained one seat from each other, meaning that the council composition remained the same.

2021 Eastleigh Borough Council election (totals summed across all 12 wards' declarations).
Party	This election			Full council			This election		
Party	Seats	Net	Seats %	Other	Total	Total %	Votes	Votes %	+/−
Liberal Democrats	10	Steady	83.3	22	32	82.1	15,992	44.7	-8.0
Independent	1	Steady	8.3	4	5	12.8	1,967	5.5	-0.3
Conservative	1	Steady	8.3	1	2	5.1	12,950	36.2	+17.0
Labour	0	Steady	0.0	0	0	0.0	4,031	11.3	+4.5
Green	0	Steady	0.0	0	0	0.0	602	1.7	-4.3
Hampshire Independents	0	Steady	0.0	0	0	0.0	146	0.4	New
Reform	0	Steady	0.0	0	0	0.0	88	0.2	New
TUSC	0	Steady	0.0	0	0	0.0	38	0.1	New

== Ward results ==
=== Bishopstoke ===
Bishopstoke
Party	Candidate	Votes	%	±%
Independent	Gin Tidridge	1,731	46.3	±0.0
Liberal Democrats	Anne Winstanley	972	26.0	−11.8
Conservative	Ben Burcombe-Filer	728	19.5	+13.2
Labour	Steve Phillips	269	7.2	+3.2
TUSC	Robert Lovell	38	1.0	N/A
Majority		759	20.3	+9.8
Turnout		3,773	44.4	+1.1
Independent hold		Swing		

=== Botley ===
Botley
Party	Candidate	Votes	%	±%
Liberal Democrats	Dave Kinloch	970	48.7	−0.9
Conservative	Joy Haythorne	854	42.9	+7.2
Labour	Alison Phillips	166	8.3	+0.3
Majority		116	5.8	−8.1
Turnout		2,012	39.0	−1.6
Liberal Democrats hold		Swing		

There was no election in Botley in 2019, so changes are shown from 2018.

=== Bursledon & Hound North ===
Bursledon & Hound North
Party	Candidate	Votes	%	±%
Liberal Democrats	Steve Holes	1,442	60.6	−0.6
Conservative	Paul Redding	723	30.4	+9.9
Labour	Catherine Cronin	216	9.1	+1.8
Majority		719	30.2	−10.1
Turnout		2,399	32.5	+2.4
Liberal Democrats hold		Swing		

=== Chandler's Ford ===
Chandler's Ford
Party	Candidate	Votes	%	±%
Liberal Democrats	David Pragnell	1,745	49.8	−5.0
Conservative	Shelagh Lee	1,452	41.5	+17.9
Labour	Greg Phillips	305	8.7	+3.1
Majority		293	8.4	−22.8
Turnout		3,521	42.0	+4.0
Liberal Democrats hold		Swing		

=== Eastleigh Central ===
Eastleigh Central
Party	Candidate	Votes	%	±%
Liberal Democrats	Wayne Irish	943	36.9	−12.6
Labour Co-op	Josh Constable	735	28.8	+11.3
Conservative	Chris Yates	641	25.1	+13.0
Hampshire Independents	Sukhdev Raj	146	5.7	N/A
Reform	Alexander Culley	88	3.4	N/A
Majority		208	8.1	−23.0
Turnout		2,565	33.0	+1.8
Liberal Democrats hold		Swing		

=== Eastleigh North ===
Eastleigh North
Party	Candidate	Votes	%	±%
Liberal Democrats	Tanya Park	1,140	44.3	−4.9
Conservative	Lisa Crosher	951	37.0	+25.8
Labour	Kathy O'Neill	482	18.7	+8.9
Majority		189	7.3	−29.6
Turnout		2,589	35.2	+2.5
Liberal Democrats hold		Swing		

=== Eastleigh South ===
Eastleigh South
Party	Candidate	Votes	%	±%
Liberal Democrats	Alex Bourne	996	42.6	−12.0
Conservative	Simon Payne	731	31.2	+18.7
Labour	Sam Jordan	613	26.2	+9.6
Majority		265	11.3	−26.4
Turnout		2,354	29.6	+1.0
Liberal Democrats hold		Swing		

=== Fair Oak & Horton Heath ===
Fair Oak & Horton Heath
Party	Candidate	Votes	%	±%
Conservative	Steve Broomfield	1,720	48.0	+20.5
Liberal Democrats	Nick Couldrey	1,057	29.5	−10.8
Green	Ben Parry	388	10.8	−3.1
Independent	Martin Lyon	236	6.6	−6.5
Labour	Jacob Phillips	179	5.0	−0.2
Majority		663	18.5	
Turnout		3,598	42.8	+4.3
Conservative gain from Liberal Democrats		Swing		

=== Hamble & Netley ===
Hamble & Netley
Party	Candidate	Votes	%	±%
Liberal Democrats	Malcolm Cross	1,771	55.9	−3.2
Conservative	Mike Preston	1,030	32.5	+16.2
Labour	Hayley Homer	368	11.6	+5.4
Majority		741	23.4	−19.1
Turnout		3,198	39.7	+4.7
Liberal Democrats hold		Swing		

=== Hedge End North ===
Hedge End North
Party	Candidate	Votes	%	±%
Liberal Democrats	Derek Pretty	1,215	49.2	−10.4
Conservative	Susan Hall	855	34.6	+16.6
Green	Glynn Fleming	214	8.7	−0.2
Labour	Steve Willoughby	187	7.6	+1.0
Majority		360	14.6	−26.8
Turnout		2,486	32.6	+4.5
Liberal Democrats hold		Swing		

=== Hedge End South ===
Hedge End South
Party	Candidate	Votes	%	±%
Liberal Democrats	Keith House	1,779	51.9	−9.7
Conservative	Jerry Hall	1,412	41.2	+19.4
Labour	Betty Layland	237	6.9	+2.7
Majority		367	10.7	−28.8
Turnout		3,458	39.7	+4.5
Liberal Democrats hold		Swing		

=== Hiltingbury ===
Hiltingbury
Party	Candidate	Votes	%	±%
Liberal Democrats	Anne Buckley	1,962	48.0	−2.6
Conservative	Margaret Atkinson	1,853	45.3	+8.9
Labour	Gwyneth Hubert	274	6.7	+3.8
Majority		109	2.7	
Turnout		4,109	49.9	+3.8
Liberal Democrats gain from Conservative		Swing		

== By-elections since May 2021 ==
=== Eastleigh Central ===
Eastleigh Central by-election, 10 February 2022
Party	Candidate	Votes	%	±%
Liberal Democrats	Bhavin Dedhia	802	44.5	+7.4
Labour Co-op	Josh Constable	433	24.0	−4.9
Conservative	Simon Payne	362	20.1	−4.7
Green	Jack Stapleton	140	7.8	New
Reform	Clare Fawcett	64	3.6	+0.1
Majority		369	20.5	+12.3
Turnout		1,806	23.9	−9.1
Liberal Democrats hold		Swing	+6.2	

The Eastleigh Central by-election followed the resignation of Liberal Democrat councillor Jephthe Doguie.
