= 2012 Eastleigh Borough Council election =

2012 UK local government election

Map of the results

Elections to Eastleigh Council were held on 3 May 2012. 15 out of 44 council seats were up for election and the Liberal Democrat party kept overall control of the council.

After the election, the composition of the council was

- Liberal Democrat 40
- Conservative 4

== Election result ==
Eastleigh Borough Council election result 2012
Party	Seats	Gains	Losses	Net gain/loss	Seats %	Votes %	Votes	+/−
Liberal Democrats	13	2	0	+2	86.7			
Conservative	2	0	0	0	13.3			
Independent	0	0	2	-2	0			
Labour	0	0	0	0	0			
UKIP	0	0	0	0	0			

== Ward results ==
Bishopstoke East
Party	Candidate	Votes	%	±%
Liberal Democrats	Trevor Mignot	652	44.0	
UKIP	Martin Lyon	355	24.0	
Labour	Mary Shephard	253	17.1	
Conservative	Lorna Atterbury	221	14.9	
Turnout		1,481	33.64	
Liberal Democrats hold		Swing		

Bishopstoke West
Party	Candidate	Votes	%	±%
Liberal Democrats	Anne Margaret Winstanley	709	45.4	
Conservative	Edward Maurice Law	155	9.9	
Labour	Sue Toher	531	34.0	
UKIP	Peter Stewart	165	10.6	
Turnout		1,560	36.42	
Liberal Democrats hold		Swing		

Botley
Party	Candidate	Votes	%	±%
Liberal Democrats	Rupert Gregory Miles Kyrle	897	49.9	
Conservative	Graham Hunter	619	34.4	
Labour	Kevin Williamson	161	9.0	
UKIP	Elizabeth McKay	121	6.7	
Turnout		1,798	44.00	
Liberal Democrats hold		Swing		

Bursledon and Old Netley
Party	Candidate	Votes	%	±%
Liberal Democrats	Steve Holes	918	49.9	
Conservative	Frair Louise Burgess	510	27.7	
Labour	Stewart Hardie	155	8.4	
UKIP	John Tomlin	147	8.0	
Green	Iain Ross MacLennan	108	5.9	
Turnout		1,838	31.60	
Liberal Democrats hold		Swing		

Chandler's Ford East
Party	Candidate	Votes	%	±%
Liberal Democrats	Haulwen Veronica Broadhurst	644	48.9	
Conservative	Paul Adrian Cole	351	36.7	
Labour	Philip Grice	170	12.9	
UKIP	Paul Michael Webber	151	11.5	
Turnout		1,316	35.03	
Liberal Democrats hold		Swing		

Chandler's Ford West
Party	Candidate	Votes	%	±%
Liberal Democrats	David Arthur Pragnell	763	47.1	
Conservative	Mark Adrian Streeter	551	34.0	
Labour	Peter Clayton	174	10.7	
UKIP	Viv Young	133	8.2	
Turnout		1,621	33.75	
Liberal Democrats hold		Swing		

Eastleigh Central
Party	Candidate	Votes	%	±%
Liberal Democrats	Simon Major Bancroft	841	38.7	
Conservative	Michael Robert Cornwall Read	297	13.7	
Labour	Chris Gilkes	605	27.9	
UKIP	Danny Bradbeer	252	11.6	
Green	Stuart Charles Jebbitt	177	8.1	
Turnout		2,172	27.10	
Liberal Democrats gain from Independent		Swing		

Eastleigh North
Party	Candidate	Votes	%	±%
Liberal Democrats	Chris Thomas	894	46.2	
Conservative	Chris Rhodes	399	20.6	
Labour	Alison Penders	294	15.2	
UKIP	Caroline Janice Bradbeer	260	13.4	
Independent	Kathy Symonds	88	4.5	
Turnout		1,935	30.22	
Liberal Democrats hold		Swing		

Eastleigh South
Party	Candidate	Votes	%	±%
Liberal Democrats	Darshan Singh Mann	742		
Labour	Peter Luffman	729		
Conservative	Cindy Harley George	286		
UKIP	Christopher Greenwood	194		
Turnout		1,957	29.508	
Liberal Democrats gain from Independent		Swing		

Fair Oak and Horton Heath
Party	Candidate	Votes	%	±%
Liberal Democrats	Andrew Lewis Cossey	1,087		
Conservative	Colin George Atterbury	504		
Labour	Gwendoline Sheila Borrill	291		
UKIP	George Hugh Mcguinness	221		
Turnout		2,105	30.8	
Liberal Democrats hold		Swing		

Hamble-Le-Rice and Butlocks Heath
Party	Candidate	Votes	%	±%
Liberal Democrats	Suzannah Louise Hamel	934		
Conservative	Elizabeth Kathleen Lear	643		
UKIP	Frederick William Estall	100		
Green	Linda Jane Maclennan	97		
Labour	Edward Tiras White	97		
Turnout		1,880	41.84	
Liberal Democrats hold		Swing		

Hedge End St.Johns
Party	Candidate	Votes	%	±%
Liberal Democrats	Jane Lynn Welsh	1,070		
Conservative	Paul Andrew Redding	673		
UKIP	Michale Steven O`Donoghue	304		
Labour	Christine Hilda McKeone	174		
Turnout		2,223	36.44	
Liberal Democrats hold		Swing		

Hiltingbury East
Party	Candidate	Votes	%	±%
Conservative	Godfrey George Olson	924		
Liberal Democrats	Peter John Child	671		
Labour	Colin Sidney James Davies	112		
UKIP	Peter John House	90		
English Democrat	John Peter Edwards	64		
Turnout		1,865	45.7	
Conservative hold		Swing		

Hiltingbury West
Party	Candidate	Votes	%	±%
Conservative	Michael Joseph Hughes	891		
Liberal Democrats	James Ian Duguid	482		
Labour	Kevin Richard Butt	165		
UKIP	Fiona Mapleson	123		
English Democrat	Mark Lancaster	42		
Turnout		1,708	40.40	
Conservative hold		Swing		

Netley Abbey
Party	Candidate	Votes	%	±%
Liberal Democrats	David John Aylwin Airey	906		
UKIP	Christopher David Martin	274		
Conservative	Maureen Beryl Queen	178		
Labour	Susan Jean Parkinson	139		
Turnout		1,502	35.6	
Liberal Democrats hold		Swing		
