= 2014 Eastleigh Borough Council election =

2014 UK local government election

Map of the results

The 2014 Eastleigh Borough Council election took place on 22 May 2014 to elect 15 members of Eastleigh Borough Council in England. This was on the same day as other local elections.

== Ward results ==
Botley
Party	Candidate	Votes	%	±%
Liberal Democrats	Angel Myerscough	752		
Conservative	Ian Bennett	522		
UKIP	Derek Moore	473		
Labour	Kevin Williamson	123		
Turnout		1870		
Liberal Democrats hold		Swing		

Bursledon and Old Netley
Party	Candidate	Votes	%	±%
Liberal Democrats	Jane Rich	848		
UKIP	Denise Evans	601		
Conservative	Frair Burgess	483		
Labour	Diane Andrewes	223		
Turnout		2155		
Liberal Democrats hold		Swing		

Chandlers Ford East
Party	Candidate	Votes	%	±%
Liberal Democrats	Pam Holden-Brown	701		
Conservative	David Shute	364		
UKIP	Michael Read	330		
Labour	Rob Emery	143		
Turnout		1538		
Liberal Democrats hold		Swing		

Chandlers Ford West
Party	Candidate	Votes	%	±%
Liberal Democrats	Alan Broadhurst	981		
Conservative	James Foulds	472		
UKIP	Tony Agnew	329		
Labour	Peter Clayton	122		
Turnout		1904		
Liberal Democrats hold		Swing		

Eastleigh Central
Party	Candidate	Votes	%	±%
Liberal Democrats	Wayne Irish	1136		
UKIP	Andrew Moore	866		
Labour	Louise Barter	549		
Conservative	Susan Hall	287		
TUSC	Ania Waterman	34		
Turnout		2872		
Liberal Democrats hold		Swing		

Eastleigh North
Party	Candidate	Votes	%	±%
Liberal Democrats	Maureen Sollitt	1150		
UKIP	Glynn Davies-Dear	828		
Labour	Stephen Goodall	261		
Independent	Sam Snook	106		
TUSC	Dave Hubble	26		
Turnout		2371		
Liberal Democrats hold		Swing		

Eastleigh South
Party	Candidate	Votes	%	±%
Liberal Democrats	Steven Sollitt	852		
UKIP	Jim Saunders	768		
Labour	Pete Luffman	512		
Conservative	Dan Brain	299		
TUSC	Tanya Judd	26		
Turnout		2457		
Liberal Democrats hold		Swing		

Steven Sollitt later left the Liberal Democrats to sit as an independent councillor in August 2017.

Fair Oak and Horton Heath
Party	Candidate	Votes	%	±%
Liberal Democrats	Desmond Scott	1150		
UKIP	Hugh McGuinness	780		
Conservative	Colin Atterbury	634		
Labour	Mary Shephard	244		
Turnout		2808		
Liberal Democrats hold		Swing		

Hedge End Grange Park
Party	Candidate	Votes	%	±%
Liberal Democrats	Louise Bloom	1035		
UKIP	John Martin	485		
Labour	Geoff Budd	208		
Turnout		1728		
Liberal Democrats hold		Swing		

Hedge End St. Johns
Party	Candidate	Votes	%	±%
Liberal Democrats	Margaret Allingham	1084		
UKIP	Michale O'Donoghue	768		
Conservative	Paul Redding	582		
Labour	Christine McKeone	122		
Turnout		2556		
Liberal Democrats hold		Swing		

Hedge End Wildern
Party	Candidate	Votes	%	±%
Liberal Democrats	Keith House	821		
UKIP	Peter House	369		
Conservative	Selina Amos	246		
Labour	Andrew Helps	112		
Turnout		1548		
Liberal Democrats hold		Swing		

Hiltingbury East
Party	Candidate	Votes	%	±%
Conservative	Margaret Atkinson	945		
Liberal Democrats	Peter Child	527		
UKIP	Martin Lyon	305		
Labour	Michael Tibble	152		
Turnout		1929		
Conservative hold		Swing		

Hiltingbury West
Party	Candidate	Votes	%	±%
Conservative	Judith Grajewski	921		
Liberal Democrats	James Duguid	571		
UKIP	Chris Kent	262		
Labour	Steve Brazier	151		
Turnout		1905		
Conservative hold		Swing		

West End North
Party	Candidate	Votes	%	±%
Liberal Democrats	Bruce Tennent	854		
UKIP	Richard North	408		
Conservative	Nicholas Arnold	294		
Labour	Alison Penders	78		
Turnout		1634		
Liberal Democrats hold		Swing		

West End South
Party	Candidate	Votes	%	±%
Liberal Democrats	Daniel Clarke	836		
UKIP	Paul Webber	443		
Conservative	Jerry Hall	366		
Labour	Nancy Smith	187		
Turnout		1832		
Liberal Democrats hold		Swing		
