= 2011 Eastleigh Borough Council election =

2011 UK local government election

The 2011 Eastleigh Borough Council election was held on Thursday 5 May 2011 to elect 14 members to Eastleigh Borough Council, the same day as other local elections in the United Kingdom. It elected approximately one-third of the council's 44 members to a four-year term. The Liberal Democrats held control of the council after the election. The turnout across the wards up for election was 42.6%.

== Results summary ==
2011 Eastleigh Borough Council election
Party	This election			Full council			This election		
Party	Seats	Net	Seats %	Other	Total	Total %	Votes	Votes %	+/−
Liberal Democrats	14	▲1	100.0	24	38	86.4	14,708	46.9	
Conservative	0	Steady	0.0	4	4	9.1	8,084	25.8	
Labour	0	▼1	0.0	0	0	0.0	5,078	16.2	
UKIP	0	Steady	0.0	0	0	0.0	2,522	8.0	
Independent Party of Eastleigh Councillors	0	New	0.0	2	2	4.5	489	1.6	New
Independent	0	Steady	0.0	0	0	0.0	378	1.2	
Green	0	Steady	0.0	0	0	0.0	91	0.3	

== Ward results ==
=== Bishopstoke East ===
Bishopstoke East
Party	Candidate	Votes	%	±%
Liberal Democrats	Angie Roling*	866	42.2	▼10.9
Conservative	Lorna Atterbury	518	25.3	▲2.7
Labour	Mary Shephard	367	17.9	▲3.9
UKIP	Martin Lyon	299	14.6	▲4.3
Majority		348	17.0	▼13.5
Total valid votes		2,050	99.0	
Rejected ballots		20	1.0	
Turnout		2,071	46.9	
Registered electors		4,418		
Liberal Democrats hold		Swing	▼6.8	

=== Bishopstoke West ===
Bishopstoke West
Party	Candidate	Votes	%	±%
Liberal Democrats	Mike Thornton*	918	44.2	▲1.5
Labour	Sue Toher	696	33.5	▼3.7
Conservative	Edward Law	314	15.1	▲2.7
UKIP	Peter Stewart	148	7.1	▼0.4
Majority		222	10.7	▲5.2
Total valid votes		2,076	99.3	
Rejected ballots		15	0.7	
Turnout		2,091	49.1	
Registered electors		4,259		
Liberal Democrats hold		Swing	▲2.6	

=== Bursledon and Old Netley ===
Bursledon and Old Netley
Party	Candidate	Votes	%	±%
Liberal Democrats	Tonia Craig*	1,111	49.4	▼7.8
Conservative	John Milne	671	29.9	▼1.3
Labour	Kevin Butt	242	10.8	▲6.0
UKIP	Elizabeth McKay	132	5.9	▼1.0
Green	Iain Maclennan	91	4.0	New
Majority		440	19.6	▼6.5
Total valid votes		2,247	99.4	
Rejected ballots		13	0.6	
Turnout		2,260	38.7	
Registered electors		5,834		
Liberal Democrats hold		Swing	▼3.3	

=== Eastleigh Central ===
Eastleigh Central
Party	Candidate	Votes	%	±%
Liberal Democrats	Keith Trenchard	1,195	40.4	▲2.3
Labour	Chris Gilkes	703	23.8	▲0.7
Conservative	Michael Read	468	15.8	▼10.0
Independent Party of Eastleigh Councillors	Andy Moore* (Note: Andy Moore was elected as the candidate for the Liberal Democrats in 2007, however he left the party after he was de-selected.)	378	12.8	New
UKIP	Danny Bradbeer	212	7.2	▲1.1
Majority		492	16.6	▲4.3
Total valid votes		2,956	99.5	
Rejected ballots		14	0.5	
Turnout		2,970	37.7	
Registered electors		7,872		
Liberal Democrats hold		Swing	▲0.8	

=== Eastleigh North ===
Eastleigh North
Party	Candidate	Votes	%	±%
Liberal Democrats	Peter Wall*	1,068	41.3	▼13.6
Conservative	Christopher Rhodes	720	27.9	▲4.5
Labour	Alison Beacham	542	21.0	▲9.1
UKIP	Caroline Bradbeer	254	9.8	Steady
Majority		348	13.5	▼18.1
Total valid votes		2,584	99.4	
Rejected ballots		15	0.6	
Turnout		2,599	40.5	
Registered electors		6,423		
Liberal Democrats hold		Swing	▼9.1	

=== Eastleigh South ===
Eastleigh South
Party	Candidate	Votes	%	±%
Liberal Democrats	Paul Bicknell	969	40.1	▲5.9
Labour	Pete Luffman	793	32.8	▼1.6
Conservative	Mark Streeter	394	16.3	▼7.1
UKIP	George Stewart	150	6.2	▼1.8
Independent Party of Eastleigh Councillors	Joan Pragnell	111	4.6	New
Majority		176	7.3	N/A
Total valid votes		2,417	99.6	
Rejected ballots		7	0.3	
Turnout		2,427	37.8	
Registered electors		6,427		
Liberal Democrats gain from Labour		Swing	▲3.8	

=== Fair Oak and Horton Heath ===
Fair Oak and Horton Heath
Party	Candidate	Votes	%	±%
Liberal Democrats	Roger Smith*	1,434	48.3	▼4.9
Conservative	Colin Atterbury	878	29.6	▼5.3
Labour	John Sorley	398	13.4	▲7.3
UKIP	Hugh McGuinness	261	8.8	▲2.9
Majority		556	18.7	▲0.4
Total valid votes		2,971	99.2	
Rejected ballots		23	0.8	
Turnout		2,994	44.3	
Registered electors		6,757		
Liberal Democrats hold		Swing	▲0.2	

=== Hamble-le-Rice and Butlocks Heath ===
Hamble-le-Rice and Butlocks Heath
Party	Candidate	Votes	%	±%
Liberal Democrats	Malcolm Cross*	1,088	51.0	▼2.3
Conservative	Elizabeth Lear	805	37.7	▼3.1
Labour	Ted White	160	7.5	▲4.0
UKIP	Vivienne Young	80	3.8	▼1.3
Majority		283	13.3	▼2.0
Total valid votes		2,133	99.7	
Rejected ballots		7	0.3	
Turnout		2,140	48.0	
Registered electors		4,460		
Liberal Democrats hold		Swing	▲0.4	

=== Hedge End Grange Park ===
Hedge End Grange Park
Party	Candidate	Votes	%	±%
Liberal Democrats	Derek Pretty*	1,039	51.7	▼8.9
Conservative	James Atterbury	501	24.9	▼7.6
Labour	Sue Parkinson	193	9.6	▲5.9
Independent	Jenny Schwausch	176	8.8	New
UKIP	John Martin	100	5.0	▲1.8
Majority		538	26.8	▼1.3
Total valid votes		2,009	99.7	
Rejected ballots		7	0.3	
Turnout		2,015	37.9	
Registered electors		5,313		
Liberal Democrats hold		Swing	▲0.7	

=== Hedge End St. John's ===
Hedge End St. John's
Party	Candidate	Votes	%	±%
Liberal Democrats	Mick Wheatley	1,276	44.3	▼7.9
Conservative	Jerry Hall	1,099	38.2	▲2.2
UKIP	Michale O'Donoghue	268	9.3	▲1.0
Labour	Gwyneth Huber	236	8.2	▲4.7
Majority		177	6.1	▼10.1
Total valid votes		2,879	99.7	
Rejected ballots		10	0.3	
Turnout		2,889	47.9	
Registered electors		6,028		
Liberal Democrats hold		Swing	▼5.0	

=== Hedge End Wildern ===
Hedge End Wildern
Party	Candidate	Votes	%	±%
Liberal Democrats	Jenny Hughes	906	51.8	▲0.6
Conservative	Paul Redding	387	22.1	▼15.6
Independent	Keith Day* (Note: Although elected as the candidate for the Liberal Democrats in Hedge End Wildern, Keith Day left the party and ran for reelection as an independent candidate.)	202	11.5	New
Labour	Christine McKeone	152	8.7	▲4.5
UKIP	Fred Estall	103	5.9	▼1.0
Majority		519	29.7	▲16.2
Total valid votes		1,750	99.3	
Rejected ballots		9	0.5	
Turnout		1,762	42.4	
Registered electors		4,154		
Liberal Democrats hold		Swing	▲8.1	

=== Netley Abbey ===
Netley Abbey
Party	Candidate	Votes	%	±%
Liberal Democrats	Luke McNulty*	1,017	58.0	▼1.5
Conservative	Michael Holliday	298	17.0	▼8.3
UKIP	Chris Martin	237	13.5	▲4.3
Labour	Beryl Addison	200	11.4	▲5.5
Majority		719	41.0	▲6.9
Total valid votes		1,752	99.5	
Rejected ballots		9	0.5	
Turnout		1,761	42.9	
Registered electors		4,103		
Liberal Democrats hold		Swing	▲3.4	

=== West End North ===
West End North
Party	Candidate	Votes	%	±%
Liberal Democrats	Tony Noyce*	853	50.1	▼5.0
Conservative	John Milne	526	30.9	▼3.3
Labour	Peter Clayton	163	9.6	▲3.5
UKIP	John Tomlin	161	9.5	▲4.8
Majority		327	19.2	▼1.8
Total valid votes		1,703	99.8	
Rejected ballots		7	0.4	
Turnout		1,706	42.1	
Registered electors		4,054		
Liberal Democrats hold		Swing	▼0.9	

=== West End South ===
West End South
Party	Candidate	Votes	%	±%
Liberal Democrats	David Goodall*	968	53.1	▼4.2
Conservative	Richard Uren	505	27.7	▼1.2
Labour	Peter Bonnell	233	12.8	▲6.5
UKIP	Paul Webber	117	6.4	▼1.2
Majority		463	25.4	▼3.0
Total valid votes		1,823	99.1	
Rejected ballots		17	0.9	
Turnout		1,840	40.5	
Registered electors		4,540		
Liberal Democrats hold		Swing	▼1.5	
