= 2004 Eastleigh Borough Council election =

2004 UK local government election

Map of the results

Elections to Eastleigh Council were held on 10 June 2004. One third of the council was up for election and the Liberal Democrat party kept overall control of the council. Overall turnout was 41.4%

After the election, the composition of the council was

- Liberal Democrat 32
- Conservative 9
- Labour 3

== Election result ==
Eastleigh local election result 2004
Party	Seats	Gains	Losses	Net gain/loss	Seats %	Votes %	Votes	+/−
Liberal Democrats	13	2	0	+2	81.3	45.6	13,754	-1.7%
Conservative	3	0	1	-1	18.8	31.1	9,364	+3.5%
Labour	0	0	1	-1	0	13.6	4,110	-6.5%
UKIP	0	0	0	0	0	9.5	2,851	+5.7%
Independent	0	0	0	0	0	0.2	55	-1.0%

== Ward results ==
Bishopstoke East
Party	Candidate	Votes	%	±%
Liberal Democrats	Trevor Mignot	657	36.6	−8.1
Conservative	Christopher Rhodes	543	30.3	+9.0
UKIP	Stephen Challis	317	17.7	+6.4
Labour	Mary Shepherd	276	15.4	−7.3
Majority		114	6.3	−15.7
Turnout		1,793	42.1	+13.1
Liberal Democrats hold		Swing		

Bishopstoke West
Party	Candidate	Votes	%	±%
Liberal Democrats	Anne Winstanley	760	38.9	+0.3
Labour	Ian Pemberton	693	35.5	−15.1
UKIP	Peter Stewart	278	14.2	+14.2
Conservative	Tristan Rhodes	222	11.4	+0.6
Majority		67	3.4	
Turnout		1,953	46.6	+6.7
Liberal Democrats hold		Swing		

Botley
Party	Candidate	Votes	%	±%
Liberal Democrats	Rupert Kyrle	1,208	61.7	
Conservative	Thomas Harvey	492	25.1	
UKIP	Donald Davey	162	8.3	
Labour	Brian Norgate	97	5.0	
Majority		716	36.6	
Turnout		1,959	49.2	+11.4
Liberal Democrats hold		Swing		

Bursledon & Old Netley
Party	Candidate	Votes	%	±%
Liberal Democrats	Stephen Holes	980	49.2	−0.4
Conservative	John Milne	606	30.5	−4.7
UKIP	Maurice Bennett	296	14.9	+7.7
Labour	Edward White	108	5.4	−2.6
Majority		374	18.7	+4.3
Turnout		1,990	36.7	+7.2
Liberal Democrats hold		Swing		

Chandler's Ford East
Party	Candidate	Votes	%	±%
Liberal Democrats	Haulwen Broadhurst	739	47.1	
Conservative	Ernest Pullen	714	45.5	
Labour	Gwyneth Hubert	116	7.4	
Majority		25	1.6	
Turnout		1,569	41.7	+2.8
Liberal Democrats gain from Conservative		Swing		

Chandler's Ford West
Party	Candidate	Votes	%	±%
Liberal Democrats	Andrew Wray	1,057	58.5	
Conservative	Andrew Gardiner	637	35.3	
Labour	Philip Grice	113	6.3	
Majority		420	23.2	
Turnout		1,807	43.2	+4.0
Liberal Democrats hold		Swing		

Eastleigh Central
Party	Candidate	Votes	%	±%
Liberal Democrats	Glynn Davies-Dear	994	40.9	−4.5
Labour	William Luffman	876	36.0	−6.7
Conservative	Stephen Gosling	290	11.9	+3.0
UKIP	Paul Webber	216	8.9	+5.9
Independent	Alan Sneddon	55	2.3	−0.7
Majority		118	4.9	+2.2
Turnout		2,431	38.6	+7.1
Liberal Democrats hold		Swing		

Eastleigh North
Party	Candidate	Votes	%	±%
Liberal Democrats	Christopher Thomas	978	46.2	−0.4
Conservative	Alan Foster	732	34.6	+18.8
Labour	Samuel Snook	408	19.3	−4.0
Majority		246	11.6	−11.7
Turnout		2,118	35.3	+6.0
Liberal Democrats hold		Swing		

Eastleigh South
Party	Candidate	Votes	%	±%
Liberal Democrats	Jennifer Head	949	40.9	+8.6
Labour	Christine Hadley	697	30.1	−18.9
UKIP	Ann Bays	343	14.8	+9.2
Conservative	Susan Hall	330	14.2	+1.1
Majority		252	10.8	−5.9
Turnout		2,319	39.6	+8.8
Liberal Democrats gain from Labour		Swing		

Fair Oak & Horton Heath
Party	Candidate	Votes	%	±%
Liberal Democrats	Joseph Wright	1,008	45.8	−17.7
Conservative	David Gillam	614	27.9	+7.4
UKIP	George McGuinness	365	16.6	+7.4
Labour	John Sorley	212	9.6	−2.2
Majority		394	17.9	−20.1
Turnout		2,199	33.9	−4.1
Liberal Democrats hold		Swing		

Hamble-le-Rice & Butlocks Heath
Party	Candidate	Votes	%	±%
Conservative	William Pepper	934	48.2	−5.5
Liberal Democrats	Malcolm Cross	738	38.1	+0.7
UKIP	Beryl Humphrey	164	8.5	+6.8
Labour	Elsie Truscott	100	5.2	−2.0
Majority		196	10.1	−6.2
Turnout		1,936	47.9	+9.0
Conservative hold		Swing		

Hedge End St Johns
Party	Candidate	Votes	%	±%
Liberal Democrats	Jane Welsh	1,072	44.2	−8.4
Conservative	Paulette Holt	700	28.9	−3.0
UKIP	Doreen Gilbert	523	21.6	+11.7
Labour	Geoffrey Kosted	128	5.3	−0.3
Majority		372	15.3	−5.4
Turnout		2,423	33.9	−5.5
Liberal Democrats hold		Swing		

Hiltingbury East
Party	Candidate	Votes	%	±%
Conservative	Godfrey Olson	1,367	60.9	
Liberal Democrats	Courtney Lane	757	33.7	
Labour	Michael Tibble	121	5.4	
Majority		610	27.2	
Turnout		2,245	54.3	+3.1
Conservative hold		Swing		

Hiltingbury West
Party	Candidate	Votes	%	±%
Conservative	Doreen Wellfare	982	48.9	
Liberal Democrats	Grahame Smith	962	47.9	
Labour	Kevin Butt	65	3.2	
Majority		20	1.0	
Turnout		2,009	51.7	+3.2
Conservative hold		Swing		

Netley Abbey
Party	Candidate	Votes	%	±%
Liberal Democrats	David Airey	895	64.7	+2.2
Conservative	Edward Brandt	201	14.5	−9.7
UKIP	Neil Smith	187	13.5	+13.5
Labour	Peter Woodcock	100	7.2	−6.1
Majority		694	50.2	+11.9
Turnout		1,383	34.7	+5.2
Liberal Democrats hold		Swing		
