= Liz Jarvis =

British politician

Liz Jarvis MP
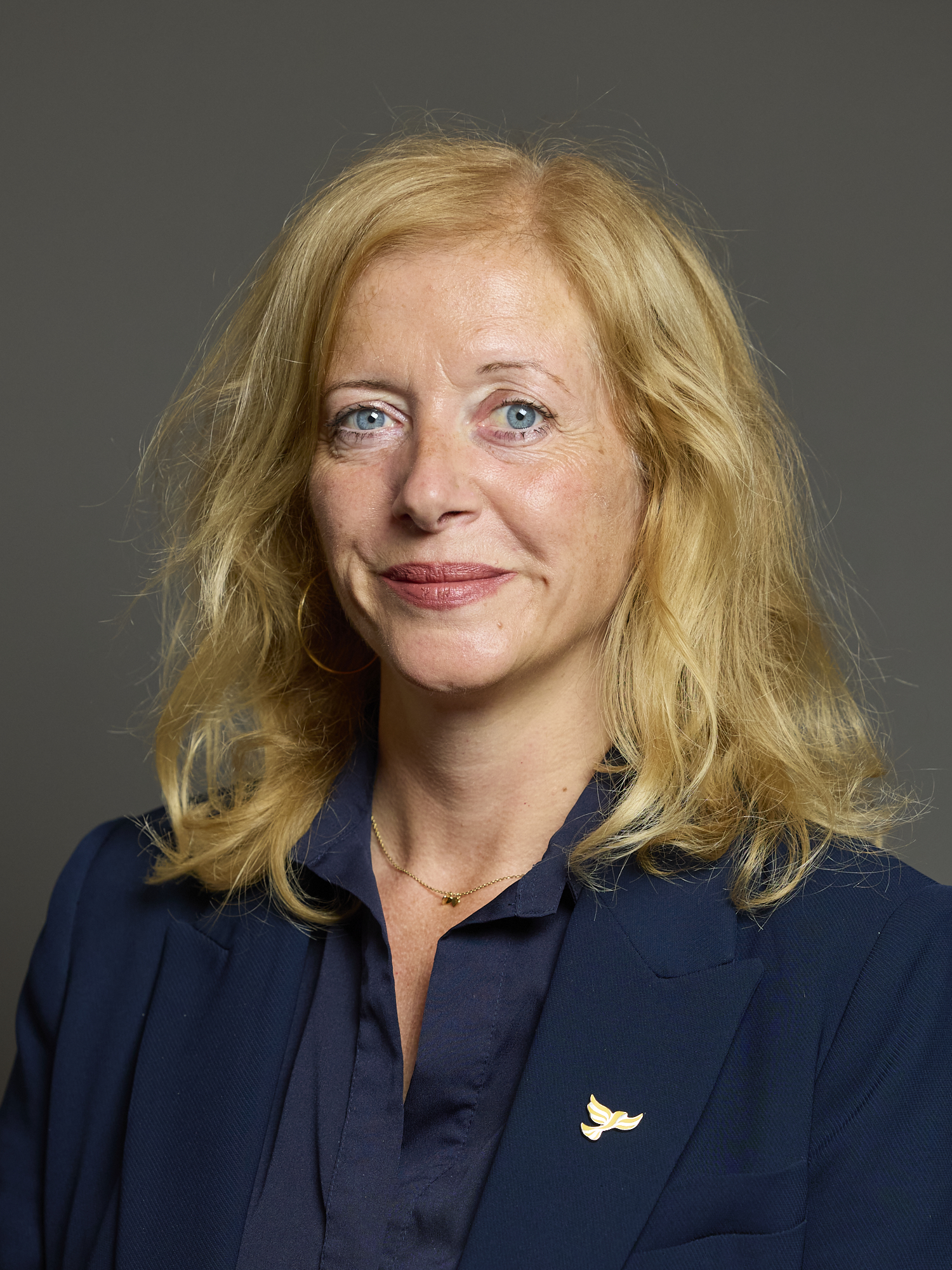
- Official portrait, 2024

Member of Parliament for Eastleigh
- Incumbent
- Assumed office 4 July 2024
- Preceded by: Paul Holmes
- Majority: 1,546 (3.3%)

Personal details
- Party: Liberal Democrats
- Education: University of Essex (BA)
- Website: https://www.lizjarvis.uk/

Elizabeth Jarvis known as Liz Jarvis, is a British Liberal Democrat politician who has been Member of Parliament (MP) for Eastleigh since 2024, gaining the seat from the Conservatives.

== Early life ==
Jarvis's mother Eileen was of Irish descent. A former secretary, she went on to become a senior social worker before gaining an Open University degree. Jarvis's father Harry was a shipping fleet personnel officer from Hampshire who had served in the British Army in the Middle East.

Her mother was a member of the Labour Party and her father voted Conservative. Jarvis has said that politics was debated at every meal and she was taken on her first march by her mother as a toddler. She and her younger sister also helped their mother volunteer at women's refuges. Jarvis's father, Harry, died suddenly before Jarvis was 21, and her mother, Eileen, died aged 92 in March 2024 after a seven-year struggle with Alzheimer's.

Jarvis was the first in her family to go to university. In 1989, she gained a BA in American literature from the University of Essex.

== Journalism career ==
Jarvis began her career in journalism on national newspapers and had a national newspaper column by the time she was 25. She went on to work on magazines, editing three, while continuing to contribute to newspapers, and also worked closely with Southampton's cruise industry. She was the editor of Cruise International magazine for eight years (2012–2020).

== Political career ==
Jarvis joined the Liberal Democrats in 2018, having been a "lifelong Labour voter". She stood in Southampton Itchen in the 2019 general election, coming third with 5.3% of the vote when the seat was won by Conservative Royston Smith with a narrow majority over Labour. In 2022 she was elected as an Eastleigh borough councillor for the Hamble and Netley ward, with a majority of over 1000.

In the 2024 general election she was elected as the Liberal Democrat MP for Eastleigh, winning the seat back from the Conservatives for the first time since 2015 and overturning a notional majority of 8,641 (calculated as the likely outcome of the 2019 election on the 2024 boundaries). She had a majority of 1,546 (3.3%) over the Conservative candidate; there were six candidates and a turnout of 66%. She chose not to stand down as a borough councillor and told journalists she would donate her councillor allowance to charities. In September 2024, she made her maiden speech in the House of Commons during a debate on Great British Energy. On 21 October 2024 she was appointed to the House of Commons Culture, Media and Sport Select Committee. In November 2024, Jarvis voted for the Terminally Ill Adults (End of Life) Bill.

She stood down as a councillor in January 2025.

== Personal life ==
Jarvis has a son whom she raised as a single parent since he was aged 18 months. She lives outside the Eastleigh constituency, in Hamble Valley. From 2019 to 2023 she was a trustee of Home-Start Westminster, a charity supporting families in London.

Parliament of the United Kingdom
Preceded by Paul Holmes	Member of Parliament for Eastleigh; 2024–present	Incumbent
