= 2006 Eastleigh Borough Council election =

2006 UK local government election

Map of the results

Elections to Eastleigh Council were held on 4 May 2006. One third of the council was up for election and the Liberal Democrat party kept overall control of the council.

After the election, the composition of the council was

- Liberal Democrat 34
- Conservative 7
- Labour 3

== Election result ==
Eastleigh local election result 2006
Party	Seats	Gains	Losses	Net gain/loss	Seats %	Votes %	Votes	+/−
Liberal Democrats	13	2	0	+2	81.3	48.5	15,340	+2.9%
Conservative	2	0	2	-2	12.5	34.0	10,743	+2.9%
Labour	1	0	0	0	6.3	11.6	3,654	-2.0%
UKIP	0	0	0	0	0	5.3	1,665	-4.2%
Independent	0	0	0	0	0	0.7	227	+0.5%

== Ward results ==
Botley
Party	Candidate	Votes	%	±%
Liberal Democrats	Catherine Fraser	1,146	66.8	+5.1
Conservative	Martin Briggs	419	24.4	−0.7
UKIP	Elizabeth McKay	78	4.5	−3.8
Labour	Geoffrey Kosted	72	4.2	−0.8
Majority		727	42.4	+5.8
Turnout		1,715	46.7	−2.5
Liberal Democrats hold		Swing		

Bursledon & Old Netley
Party	Candidate	Votes	%	±%
Liberal Democrats	Hugh Millar	1,028	53.1	+3.9
Conservative	John Milne	698	36.0	+5.5
UKIP	Beryl Humphrey	114	5.9	−9.0
Labour	Elsie Truscott	97	5.0	−0.4
Majority		430	17.1	−1.6
Turnout		1,937	34.4	−2.3
Liberal Democrats hold		Swing		

Chandler's Ford East
Party	Candidate	Votes	%	±%
Liberal Democrats	Pamela Holden-Brown	890	54.2	+7.1
Conservative	Doretta Cocks	575	35.0	−10.5
UKIP	Paul Webber	94	5.7	+5.7
Labour	Peter Clayton	84	5.1	−2.3
Majority		315	19.2	+17.6
Turnout		1,643	43.9	+2.2
Liberal Democrats gain from Conservative		Swing		

Chandler's Ford West
Party	Candidate	Votes	%	±%
Liberal Democrats	Alan Broadhurst	1,077	55.7	−2.8
Conservative	Matthew Simmonds	685	35.4	+0.1
UKIP	Ann Bays	91	4.7	+4.7
Labour	Philip Grice	81	4.2	−2.1
Majority		392	20.3	−2.9
Turnout		1,934	44.5	+1.3
Liberal Democrats hold		Swing		

Eastleigh Central (2)
Party	Candidate	Votes	%	±%
Liberal Democrats	Wayne Irish	951		
Liberal Democrats	Deepak Gupta	845		
Labour	Christine Hadley	772		
Labour	William Luffman	733		
Conservative	Robert Quane	593		
Conservative	Judith Grajewski	513		
UKIP	Stephen Challis	214		
Turnout		4,621	34.8	−3.8
Liberal Democrats hold		Swing		
Liberal Democrats hold		Swing		

Eastleigh North
Party	Candidate	Votes	%	±%
Liberal Democrats	Maureen Sollitt	1,081	51.9	+5.7
Conservative	Jayne Hellier	529	25.4	−9.2
Labour	Edward White	280	13.4	−5.9
UKIP	Neil Smith	193	9.3	+9.3
Majority		552	26.5	+14.9
Turnout		2,083	34.4	−0.9
Liberal Democrats hold		Swing		

Eastleigh South
Party	Candidate	Votes	%	±%
Labour	Peter Luffman	970	42.7	+12.6
Liberal Democrats	Martin Kyrle	775	34.1	−6.8
Conservative	Felicity Smith	298	13.1	−1.1
Independent	Samuel Snook	227	10.0	+10.0
Majority		195	8.6	
Turnout		2,270	38.5	−1.1
Labour hold		Swing		

Fair Oak and Horton Heath
Party	Candidate	Votes	%	±%
Liberal Democrats	Philip Spearey	1,053	46.4	+0.6
Conservative	Christopher Rhodes	903	39.8	+11.9
Labour	John Sorley	168	7.4	−2.2
UKIP	George McGuinness	143	6.3	−10.3
Majority		150	6.6	−11.3
Turnout		2,267	34.5	+0.6
Liberal Democrats hold		Swing		

Hedge End Grange Park
Party	Candidate	Votes	%	±%
Liberal Democrats	Louise Bloom	1,019	61.2	+6.3
Conservative	Paul Philp	562	33.7	−7.3
Labour	George Carter	46	2.8	−1.3
UKIP	Caroline Bradbeer	39	2.3	+2.3
Majority		457	27.5	+13.6
Turnout		1,666	38.5	+10.4
Liberal Democrats hold		Swing		

Hedge End St. Johns
Party	Candidate	Votes	%	±%
Liberal Democrats	Julie Skinner	1,298	50.9	−1.7
Conservative	Jeremy Hall	1,006	39.5	+7.6
UKIP	Michale O'Donoghue	246	9.6	−0.3
Majority		292	11.4	−9.3
Turnout		2,550	43.5	+4.1
Liberal Democrats gain from Conservative		Swing		

Hedge End Wildern
Party	Candidate	Votes	%	±%
Liberal Democrats	Keith House	920	58.5	+6.2
Conservative	Peter Hudson	550	35.0	−5.5
UKIP	Frederick Estall	103	6.5	+6.5
Majority		370	23.5	+11.7
Turnout		1,573	38.6	+10.1
Liberal Democrats hold		Swing		

Hiltingbury East
Party	Candidate	Votes	%	±%
Conservative	John Caldwell	1,326	63.3	+2.4
Liberal Democrats	Peter Child	587	28.0	−5.7
UKIP	Marion Stewart	109	5.2	+5.2
Labour	Beryl Addison	73	3.5	−1.9
Majority		739	35.3	+8.1
Turnout		2,095	51.0	−3.3
Conservative hold		Swing		

Hiltingbury West
Party	Candidate	Votes	%	±%
Conservative	Colin Davidovitz	994	50.6	+1.7
Liberal Democrats	Grahame Smith	839	42.7	−5.2
UKIP	Vivienne Young	79	4.0	+4.0
Labour	Kevin Butt	53	2.7	−0.5
Majority		155	7.9	+6.9
Turnout		1,965	48.1	−3.6
Conservative hold		Swing		

West End North
Party	Candidate	Votes	%	±%
Liberal Democrats	Bruce Tennent	871	54.0	+9.6
Conservative	Neville Dickinson	577	35.8	−11.1
Labour	Edith Durham	100	6.2	−2.6
UKIP	Daniel Bradbeer	64	4.0	+4.0
Majority		294	18.2	
Turnout		1,612	41.2	+9.4
Liberal Democrats hold		Swing		

West End South
Party	Candidate	Votes	%	±%
Liberal Democrats	Joyce Sortwell	960	56.5	+8.4
Conservative	Reginald Campbell	515	30.3	−11.4
Labour	Daniel Clarke	125	7.4	−2.9
UKIP	Peter Stewart	98	5.8	+5.8
Majority		445	26.2	+19.8
Turnout		1,698	37.7	
Liberal Democrats hold		Swing		
