= 2003 Eastleigh Borough Council election =

2003 UK local government election

Map of the results

Elections to Eastleigh Council were held on 1 May 2003. One third of the council was up for election and the Liberal Democrat party kept overall control of the council.

After the election, the composition of the council was

- Liberal Democrat 30
- Conservative 10
- Labour 4

== Election result ==
Eastleigh local election result 2003
Party	Seats	Gains	Losses	Net gain/loss	Seats %	Votes %	Votes	+/−
Liberal Democrats	10	1	2	-1	71.4	47.3	10,136	-1.5%
Conservative	2	1	0	+1	14.3	27.6	5,921	-4.4%
Labour	2	1	1	0	14.3	20.1	4,311	+1.3%
UKIP	0	0	0	0	0	3.8	817	+3.4%
Independent	0	0	0	0	0	1.2	253	+1.1%

== Ward results ==
Bishopstoke East
Party	Candidate	Votes	%	±%
Liberal Democrats	Angela Roling	560	44.7	
Labour	Mary Shepherd	285	22.7	
Conservative	Peter Bryant	267	21.3	
UKIP	Stephen Challis	142	11.3	
Majority		275	22.0	
Turnout		1,254	29.0	−3.2
Liberal Democrats hold		Swing		

Bishopstoke West
Party	Candidate	Votes	%	±%
Labour	Susan Toher	836	50.6	
Liberal Democrats	Andrew Moore	638	38.6	
Conservative	Michael McKay	179	10.8	
Majority		198	12.0	
Turnout		1,653	39.9	−2.7
Labour gain from Liberal Democrats		Swing		

Burlesdon & Old Netley
Party	Candidate	Votes	%	±%
Liberal Democrats	Antonia Craig	795	49.6	
Conservative	Paul Elswood	565	35.2	
Labour	Rodney Cummins	128	8.0	
UKIP	Maurice Bennett	116	7.2	
Majority		230	14.4	
Turnout		1,604	29.5	−3.9
Liberal Democrats hold		Swing		

Eastleigh Central
Party	Candidate	Votes	%	±%
Liberal Democrats	Steven Sollitt	889	45.4	
Labour	William Luffman	837	42.7	
Conservative	Stephen Gosling	175	8.9	
UKIP	Timothy Cruell	58	3.0	
Majority		51	2.7	
Turnout		1,959	31.5	−1.8
Liberal Democrats gain from Labour		Swing		

Eastleigh North
Party	Candidate	Votes	%	±%
Liberal Democrats	Peter Wall	825	46.6	
Labour	Christopher Abraham	413	23.3	
Conservative	Richard Hall	280	15.8	
Independent	Samuel Snook	253	14.3	
Majority		412	23.3	
Turnout		1,771	29.3	−3.4
Liberal Democrats hold		Swing		

Eastleigh South
Party	Candidate	Votes	%	±%
Labour	Gillian Connell	854	49.0	
Liberal Democrats	William Furness	563	32.3	
Conservative	Susan Hall	229	13.1	
UKIP	Ann Bays	97	5.6	
Majority		291	16.7	
Turnout		1,743	30.8	−1.1
Labour hold		Swing		

Fair Oak & Horton Heath
Party	Candidate	Votes	%	±%
Liberal Democrats	Roger Smith	944	58.5	
Conservative	Martin Briggs	330	20.5	
Labour	John Sorley	191	11.8	
UKIP	George McGuinness	148	9.2	
Majority		614	38.0	
Turnout		1,613	25.4	−5.2
Liberal Democrats hold		Swing		

Hamble-le-Rice & Butlocks Heath
Party	Candidate	Votes	%	±%
Conservative	Bernie Wright	835	53.7	
Liberal Democrats	Malcolm Cross	582	37.4	
Labour	Elsie Truscott	112	7.2	
UKIP	Beryl Humphrey	27	1.7	
Majority		253	16.3	
Turnout		1,556	38.9	−1.1
Conservative hold		Swing		

Hedge End St Johns
Party	Candidate	Votes	%	±%
Liberal Democrats	June Hughes	1,219	52.6	
Conservative	Paulette Holt	740	31.9	
UKIP	Frederick Estall	229	9.9	
Labour	Paul Christopher	130	5.6	
Majority		479	20.7	
Turnout		2,318	39.4	+3.9
Liberal Democrats hold		Swing		

Hedge End Grange Park
Party	Candidate	Votes	%	±%
Liberal Democrats	Derek Pretty	618	54.9	
Conservative	Paul Philp	461	41.0	
Labour	Philip Grice	46	4.1	
Majority		157	13.9	
Turnout		1,125	28.1	−3.0
Liberal Democrats hold		Swing		

Hedge End Wildern
Party	Candidate	Votes	%	±%
Liberal Democrats	George Fraser	609	52.3	
Conservative	Thomas Harvey	471	40.5	
Labour	Ian Jelly	84	7.2	
Majority		138	11.8	
Turnout		1,164	28.5	
Liberal Democrats hold		Swing		

Netley Abbey
Party	Candidate	Votes	%	±%
Liberal Democrats	George Wintle	743	62.5	
Conservative	Anthony Blackman	287	24.2	
Labour	Matthew Crocker	158	13.3	
Majority		456	38.3	
Turnout		1,188	29.5	−3.4
Liberal Democrats hold		Swing		

West End North
Party	Candidate	Votes	%	±%
Conservative	Steven Broomfield	578	46.9	
Liberal Democrats	Martin Kyrle	547	44.4	
Labour	Christine Hadley	108	8.8	
Majority		31	2.5	
Turnout		1,233	31.8	+0.5
Conservative gain from Liberal Democrats		Swing		

West End South
Party	Candidate	Votes	%	±%
Liberal Democrats	David Goodall	604	48.1	
Conservative	Colin Murphy	524	41.7	
Labour	Nigel Welton	129	10.3	
Majority		80	6.4	
Turnout		1,257	28.0	−2.1
Liberal Democrats hold		Swing		
