= 2007 Eastleigh Borough Council election =

2007 UK local government election

Map of the results

Elections to Eastleigh Council were held on 3 May 2007, in Hampshire, England. One third of the council was up for election and the Liberal Democrat party kept overall control of the council.

After the election, the composition of the council was

- Liberal Democrat 37
- Conservative 5
- Labour 2

== Election result ==
Eastleigh local election result 2007
Party	Seats	Gains	Losses	Net gain/loss	Seats %	Votes %	Votes	+/−
Liberal Democrats	13	3	0	+3	92.9	50.8	13,718	+2.3%
Labour	1	0	1	-1	7.1	12.3	3,326	+0.7%
Conservative	0	0	2	-2	0	29.1	7,855	-4.9%
UKIP	0	0	0	0	0	7.1	1,924	+1.8%
Green	0	0	0	0	0	0.5	143	+0.5%
Independent	0	0	0	0	0	0.1	31	-0.6%

== Ward results ==
Bishopstoke East
Party	Candidate	Votes	%	±%
Liberal Democrats	Angela Roling	860	53.1	+26.5
Conservative	Edward Law	366	22.6	−7.7
Labour	Wendy Borrill	226	14.0	−1.4
UKIP	Vivienne Young	167	10.3	−7.4
Majority		494	30.5	+24.2
Turnout		1,619	36.9	−5.2
Liberal Democrats hold		Swing		

Bishopstoke West
Party	Candidate	Votes	%	±%
Liberal Democrats	Michael Thornton	785	42.8	+3.9
Labour	Sue Toher	684	37.3	+1.8
Conservative	Tristan Rhodes	228	12.4	+1.0
UKIP	Steve Challis	139	7.6	−6.6
Majority		101	5.5	+2.1
Turnout		1,836	44.2	−2.4
Liberal Democrats gain from Labour		Swing		

Burlesdon & Old Netley
Party	Candidate	Votes	%	±%
Liberal Democrats	Tonia Craig	1,092	57.2	+4.1
Conservative	John Milne	594	31.1	−4.9
UKIP	Neil Smith	131	6.9	+1.0
Labour	Pat Moran	92	4.8	−0.2
Majority		498	26.5	+9.4
Turnout		1,909	33.5	−0.9
Liberal Democrats hold		Swing		

Eastleigh Central
Party	Candidate	Votes	%	±%
Liberal Democrats	Andrew Moore	970	38.1	
Conservative	Robert Quane	657	25.8	
Labour	Christine Hadley	587	23.1	
UKIP	Paul Webber	155	6.1	
Green	Sarah Goode	143	5.6	
Independent	Alan Sneddon	31	1.2	
Majority		313	12.3	
Turnout		2,543	33.7	−1.1
Liberal Democrats hold		Swing		

Eastleigh North
Party	Candidate	Votes	%	±%
Liberal Democrats	Peter Wall	1,136	54.9	+3.0
Conservative	Chris Melton	483	23.4	−2.0
Labour	Ted White	246	11.9	−1.5
UKIP	Caroline Bradbeer	203	9.8	+0.5
Majority		653	31.5	+5.0
Turnout		2,068	34.1	−0.3
Liberal Democrats hold		Swing		

Eastleigh South
Party	Candidate	Votes	%	±%
Labour	Brian Norgate	772	34.4	−8.3
Liberal Democrats	Martin Kyrle	766	34.2	+0.1
Conservative	Andrew Ross	525	23.4	+10.3
UKIP	Ann Bays	180	8.0	+8.0
Majority		6	0.2	−8.4
Turnout		2,243	38.4	−0.1
Labour hold		Swing		

Fair Oak & Horton Heath
Party	Candidate	Votes	%	±%
Liberal Democrats	Roger Smith	1,358	53.2	+6.8
Conservative	Chris Rhodes	890	34.9	−4.9
Labour	John Sorley	156	6.1	−1.3
UKIP	Hugh McGuinness	149	5.8	−0.5
Majority		468	18.3	+11.7
Turnout		2,553	38.5	+4.0
Liberal Democrats hold		Swing		

Hamble-le-Rice & Butlocks Heath
Party	Candidate	Votes	%	±%
Liberal Democrats	Malcolm Cross	1,052	53.3	+15.2
Conservative	David Meffett	750	38.0	−10.0
UKIP	Beryl Humphrey	100	5.1	−3.4
Labour	Elsie Truscott	70	3.5	−1.7
Majority		302	15.3	
Turnout		1,972	45.4	−2.5
Liberal Democrats gain from Conservative		Swing		

Hedge End Grange Park
Party	Candidate	Votes	%	±%
Liberal Democrats	Derek Pretty	882	60.6	−0.6
Conservative	Paul Philp	473	32.5	−1.2
Labour	Kevin Butt	54	3.7	+0.9
UKIP	Simon Young	46	3.2	+0.9
Majority		409	28.1	+0.6
Turnout		1,455	26.1	−1.4
Liberal Democrats hold		Swing		

Hedge End St Johns
Party	Candidate	Votes	%	±%
Liberal Democrats	June Hughes	1,338	52.2	+1.3
Conservative	Jerry Hall	922	36.0	−3.5
UKIP	Michale O'Donoghue	214	8.3	−1.3
Labour	Geoffrey Kosted	89	3.5	+3.5
Majority		416	16.2	+4.8
Turnout		2,563	43.8	+0.3
Liberal Democrats hold		Swing		

Hedge End Wildern
Party	Candidate	Votes	%	±%
Liberal Democrats	Keith Day	764	51.2	−7.3
Conservative	Peter Hudson	563	37.7	+2.7
UKIP	Elizabeth McKay	103	6.9	+0.4
Labour	Bill Luffman	62	4.2	+4.2
Majority		201	13.5	−10.0
Turnout		1,492	36.3	−2.3
Liberal Democrats hold		Swing		

Netley Abbey
Party	Candidate	Votes	%	±%
Liberal Democrats	Luke McNulty	885	59.5	−5.2
Conservative	Maureen Queen	377	25.4	+10.9
UKIP	Fred Estall	137	9.2	−4.3
Labour	Gwyneth Hubert	88	5.9	−1.3
Majority		508	34.1	−16.1
Turnout		1,487	37.2	+2.5
Liberal Democrats hold		Swing		

West End North
Party	Candidate	Votes	%	±%
Liberal Democrats	Tony Noyce	904	55.1	+1.1
Conservative	Steven Broomfield	560	34.1	−1.7
Labour	Pat Rose	99	6.0	−0.2
UKIP	Dan Bradbeer	77	4.7	+0.7
Majority		344	21.0	+2.8
Turnout		1,640	41.8	+0.6
Liberal Democrats gain from Conservative		Swing		

West End South
Party	Candidate	Votes	%	±%
Liberal Democrats	David Goodall	926	57.3	+0.8
Conservative	Reggie Campbell	467	28.9	−1.4
UKIP	Peter Stewart	123	7.6	+1.8
Labour	Daniel Clarke	101	6.2	−1.2
Majority		459	28.4	+2.2
Turnout		1,617	35.6	−2.1
Liberal Democrats hold		Swing		
