= 2000 Eastleigh Borough Council election =

2000 UK local government election

The 2000 Eastleigh Council election took place on 4 May 2000 to elect members of Eastleigh borough council in Hampshire, England. One third of the council was up for election and the Liberal Democrat party kept overall control of the council.

After the election, the composition of the council was

- Liberal Democrat 28
- Conservative 9
- Labour 7

== Election result ==
Eastleigh local election result 2000
Party	Seats	Gains	Losses	Net gain/loss	Seats %	Votes %	Votes	+/−
Liberal Democrats	8			-1	53.3			
Conservative	5			+2	33.3			
Labour	2			-1	13.3			
