= 2010 Eastleigh Borough Council election =

2010 UK local government election

Map of the results

Elections to Eastleigh Council were held on 4 May 2010. One third of the council was up for election and the Liberal Democrats kept overall control of the council.

After the election, the composition of the council was:

- Liberal Democrat 39
- Conservative 4
- Labour 1

== Election result ==
Eastleigh local election result 2010
Party	Seats	Gains	Losses	Net gain/loss	Seats %	Votes %	Votes	+/−
Liberal Democrats	13	1	0	+1	86.7			
Conservative	2	0	0	0	6.67			
Labour	1	0	1	-1	6.67			
UKIP	0	0	0	0	0.0			
Independent	0	0	0	0	0.0			

== Ward results ==
Botley
Party	Candidate	Votes	%	±%
Liberal Democrats	Catherine Fraser	1,528	51.1	
Conservative	Jerry Hall	1,160	38.9	
Labour	Geoffrey Kosted	170	5.7	
UKIP	Peter Stewart	126	4.2	
Majority		368		
Turnout		2984	74.1	
Liberal Democrats hold		Swing		

Bursledon & Old Netley
Party	Candidate	Votes	%	±%
Liberal Democrats	Justin Baker	2025	52.1	
Conservative	John Milne	1371	35.2	
Labour	Justin Baker	298	7.7	
UKIP	Beryl Humphrey	196	4.9	
Majority		654		
Turnout		3980	67.0	
Liberal Democrats hold		Swing		

Chandler's Ford East
Party	Candidate	Votes	%	±%
Liberal Democrats	Pam Holden-Brown	1348	49.3	
Conservative	John Milne	1019	37.3	
Labour	Beryl Addison	211	7.7	
UKIP	Paul Webber	155	5.7	
Majority		329	12.0	
Turnout		2733	72.7	
Liberal Democrats hold		Swing		

Chandler's Ford West
Party	Candidate	Votes	%	±%
Liberal Democrats	Alan Broadhurst	1779	51.9	
Conservative	Cindy George	1295	37.8	
Labour	Philip Grice	236	6.9	
UKIP	Angela Young	115	3.4	
Majority		484		
Turnout		3429	73.7	
Liberal Democrats hold		Swing		

Eastleigh Central
Party	Candidate	Votes	%	±%
Liberal Democrats		2604	54.7	
Conservative		1015	21.3	
Labour		793	16.7	
UKIP		262	5.5	
Independent		83	1.7	
Turnout		4757	60.95	
Liberal Democrats hold		Swing		

Eastleigh North
Party	Candidate	Votes	%	±%
Liberal Democrats	Maureen Sollitt	2329	54.9	
Conservative		1215	28.6	
Labour		517	12.2	
UKIP		182	4.3	
Majority		1114		
Turnout		4,243	67.47	
Liberal Democrats hold		Swing		

Eastleigh South
Party	Candidate	Votes	%	±%
Liberal Democrats	Roy Sollitt	1831	48.6	
Labour	Peter Luffman	878	23.3	
Conservative	Felicity Smith	841	22.3	
UKIP	George Stewart	221	5.9	
Majority		953		
Turnout		3771	61.66	
Liberal Democrats gain from Labour		Swing		

Fair Oak and Horton Heath
Party	Candidate	Votes	%	±%
Liberal Democrats	Des Scott	2,737	54.2	
Conservative	Christopher Rhodes	1,703	31.5	
Labour	Mary Shephard	336	6.2	
UKIP	Hugh McGuinness	273	5.0	
Majority		1034	34.3	
Turnout		5,409	75.1	
Liberal Democrats hold		Swing		

Hedge End Grange Park
Party	Candidate	Votes	%	±%
Liberal Democrats	Louise Bloom	1,019	61.2	+6.3
Conservative	Paul Philp	562	33.7	−7.3
Labour	George Carter	46	2.8	−1.3
UKIP	Caroline Bradbeer	39	2.3	+2.3
Majority		457	27.5	+13.6
Turnout		1,666	38.5	+10.4
Liberal Democrats hold		Swing		

Hedge End St. Johns
Party	Candidate	Votes	%	±%
Liberal Democrats	Julie Skinner	1,298	50.9	−1.7
Conservative	Jeremy Hall	1,006	39.5	+7.6
UKIP	Michale O'Donoghue	246	9.6	−0.3
Majority		292	11.4	−9.3
Turnout		2,550	43.5	+4.1
Liberal Democrats gain from Conservative		Swing		

Hedge End Wildern
Party	Candidate	Votes	%	±%
Liberal Democrats	Keith House	920	58.5	+6.2
Conservative	Peter Hudson	550	35.0	−5.5
UKIP	Frederick Estall	103	6.5	+6.5
Majority		370	23.5	+11.7
Turnout		1,573	38.6	+10.1
Liberal Democrats hold		Swing		

Hiltingbury East
Party	Candidate	Votes	%	±%
Conservative	John Caldwell	1,326	63.3	+2.4
Liberal Democrats	Peter Child	587	28.0	−5.7
UKIP	Marion Stewart	109	5.2	+5.2
Labour	Beryl Addison	73	3.5	−1.9
Majority		739	35.3	+8.1
Turnout		2,095	51.0	−3.3
Conservative hold		Swing		

Hiltingbury West
Party	Candidate	Votes	%	±%
Conservative	Colin Davidovitz	994	50.6	+1.7
Liberal Democrats	Grahame Smith	839	42.7	−5.2
UKIP	Vivienne Young	79	4.0	+4.0
Labour	Kevin Butt	53	2.7	−0.5
Majority		155	7.9	+6.9
Turnout		1,965	48.1	−3.6
Conservative hold		Swing		

West End North
Party	Candidate	Votes	%	±%
Liberal Democrats	Bruce Tennent	871	54.0	+9.6
Conservative	Neville Dickinson	577	35.8	−11.1
Labour	Edith Durham	100	6.2	−2.6
UKIP	Daniel Bradbeer	64	4.0	+4.0
Majority		294	18.2	
Turnout		1,612	41.2	+9.4
Liberal Democrats hold		Swing		

West End South
Party	Candidate	Votes	%	±%
Liberal Democrats	Joyce Sortwell	960	56.5	+8.4
Conservative	Reginald Campbell	515	30.3	−11.4
Labour	Daniel Clarke	125	7.4	−2.9
UKIP	Peter Stewart	98	5.8	+5.8
Majority		445	26.2	+19.8
Turnout		1,698	37.7	
Liberal Democrats hold		Swing		
