= 2016 Eastleigh Borough Council election =

2016 UK local government election

2016 local election results in Eastleigh

The 2016 Eastleigh Borough Council election took place on 5 May 2016 to elect 15 members of Eastleigh Borough Council in England (approximately one third). This was on the same day as other local elections.

Eastleigh Borough Council Election, 2016
Party	Seats	Gains	Losses	Net gain/loss	Seats %	Votes %	Votes	+/−
Liberal Democrats	38	1	0	+1				
Conservative	6	0	0	nc				
UKIP	0							
Labour	0							
Green	0							

== Ward results ==
=== Bishopstoke East ===
Bishopstoke East 2016
Party	Candidate	Votes	%	±%
Liberal Democrats	Trevor Mignot	787	47.4	
UKIP	Martin Lyon	423	25.5	
Conservative	Tom Yates	211	12.7	
Labour	Christine McKeone	165	9.9	
Green	Ania Waterman	73	4.4	
Majority		364	21.9	
Liberal Democrats hold		Swing		

=== Bishopstoke West ===
Bishopstoke West 2016
Party	Candidate	Votes	%	±%
Liberal Democrats	Anne Margaret Winstanley	625	38.8	
Labour	Sue Toher	456	28.3	
UKIP	John Peter Edwards	191	11.9	
Conservative	Chris Yates	191	11.9	
Green	David Hubble	147	9.1	
Majority		169	10.5	
Liberal Democrats hold		Swing		

=== Botley ===
Botley 2016
Party	Candidate	Votes	%	±%
Liberal Democrats	Rupert Gregory Miles Kyrle	932	53.7	
Conservative	Ian Almeric Bennett	387	22.3	
UKIP	Chris Greenwood	295	17.0	
Labour	Kevin Paul Williamson	123	7.1	
Majority		545	31.4	
Liberal Democrats hold		Swing		

=== Bursledon and Old Netley ===
1848

Bursledon and Old Netley 2016
Party	Candidate	Votes	%	±%
Liberal Democrats	Steve Holes	1,172	63.4	
Conservative	Stephanie Louise Arnold	350	18.9	
UKIP	Derek Daniels	233	12.6	
Labour	Shere Sattar	93	5.0	
Majority		822	44.5	
Liberal Democrats hold		Swing		

=== Chandlers Ford East ===
1436

Chandlers Ford East 2016
Party	Candidate	Votes	%	±%
Liberal Democrats	Haulwen Veronica Broadhurst	703	49.0	
Conservative	John Hamilton Reynolds	433	30.2	
UKIP	Pete House	179	12.5	
Labour	Sarah Mann	121	8.4	
Majority		270	18.8	
Liberal Democrats hold		Swing		

=== Chandlers Ford West ===
Chandlers Ford West 2016
Party	Candidate	Votes	%	±%
Liberal Democrats	David Arthur Pragnell	937	51.2	
Conservative	Keith Frederick Hatch	519	28.3	
UKIP	Andy Whitehouse	209	11.4	
Labour	Peter Clayton	166	9.1	
Majority		418	22.9	
Liberal Democrats hold		Swing		

=== Eastleigh Central ===
2491

Eastleigh Central 2016
Party	Candidate	Votes	%	±%
Liberal Democrats	Mark Leonard Balaam	1,039	41.7	
UKIP	Andy Moore	627	25.2	
Labour	Steve Phillips	481	19.3	
Conservative	Simon Payne	344	13.8	
Majority		412	16.5	
Liberal Democrats hold		Swing		

=== Eastleigh North ===
Eastleigh North 2016
Party	Candidate	Votes	%	±%
Liberal Democrats	Christopher Andrew Thomas	861	42.6	
UKIP	Keith Iain McFarlane	408	20.2	
Conservative	Mike Holliday	359	17.8	
Labour	Kathy O'Neill	303	15.0	
Green	Alexander David Hughes	90	4.5	
Majority		453	22.4	
Liberal Democrats hold		Swing		

=== Eastleigh South ===
2141

Eastleigh South 2016
Party	Candidate	Votes	%	±%
Liberal Democrats	Darshan Singh	852	39.8	
Labour	Pete Luffman	543	25.4	
UKIP	Jan Weller	474	22.1	
Conservative	Nick Arnold	272	12.7	
Majority		309	14.4	
Liberal Democrats hold		Swing		

=== Fair Oak and Horton Heath ===
Fair Oak and Horton Heath 2016
Party	Candidate	Votes	%	±%
Liberal Democrats	Rob Rushton	959	39.2	
Conservative	Steven Dennis Broomfield	661	27.0	
UKIP	Hugh McGuinness	547	22.4	
Labour	Mary Shephard	279	11.4	
Majority		298	12.2	
Liberal Democrats hold		Swing		

=== Hamble-Le-Rice and Butlocks Heath ===
1917

Hamble-Le-Rice and Butlocks Heath 2016
Party	Candidate	Votes	%	±%
Liberal Democrats	Malcolm Robert Cross	1,052	54.9	
Conservative	Sheelagh de Carteret Cohen	619	32.3	
UKIP	Hilary Daniels	130	6.8	
Labour	Chris Rogers	116	6.1	
Majority		433	22.6	
Liberal Democrats gain from Independent		Swing		

=== Hedge End St Johns ===
2416

Hedge End St Johns 2016
Party	Candidate	Votes	%	±%
Liberal Democrats	Cynthia Margaret Garton	1,127	46.6	
Conservative	Graham Robert Piper	795	32.9	
UKIP	Paul Michael Webber	301	12.5	
Labour	Terry Crow	141	5.8	
Green	Liam Fleming	52	2.2	
Majority		332	13.7	
Liberal Democrats hold		Swing		

=== Hiltingbury East ===
Hiltingbury East 2016
Party	Candidate	Votes	%	±%
Conservative	Daniel Edward Hatfield	1,013	54.1	
Liberal Democrats	Beverley Anne Rose	607	32.4	
UKIP	Jean Leech	154	8.2	
Labour	Michael Tibble	100	5.3	
Majority		406	21.7	
Conservative hold		Swing		

=== Hiltingbury West ===
1722

Hiltingbury West 2016
Party	Candidate	Votes	%	±%
Conservative	Michael Joseph Hughes	967	56.2	
Liberal Democrats	James Ian Duguid	621	36.1	
Labour	Kevin Butt	134	7.8	
Majority		346	20.1	
Conservative hold		Swing		

=== Netley Abbey ===
1509

Netley Abbey 2016
Party	Candidate	Votes	%	±%
Liberal Democrats	David John Aylwin Airey	1,045	69.3	
UKIP	Chris Martin	174	11.5	
Conservative	Jamie Mills	166	11.0	
Labour	Siobhan O'Rourke	124	8.2	
Majority		871	57.8	
Liberal Democrats hold		Swing		
