= 2019 Eastleigh Borough Council election =

Council election

- 2 May 2019

13 of 39 seats (One Third) to Eastleigh Borough Council 20 seats needed for a majority
	First party	Second party	Third party
Party	Liberal Democrats	Conservative	Independents
Last election	10, 51.1%	2, 27.2%	1, 6.2%
Seats won	12 (34 total)	0 (2 total)	1 (3 total)
Seat change	▲2	▼2	0
Popular vote	17,305	6,495	1,952
Percentage	52.1%	19.5%	5.9%
Swing	▲1.0%	▼7.7%	▼0.3%
- Results by ward in 2019. White denotes no election held in this ward this year
Council control before election
Liberal Democrats
Council control after election
Liberal Democrats

The 2019 Eastleigh Borough Council election took place on 2 May 2019 to elect one third of members of Eastleigh Borough Council. The outcome was a strengthened majority for the incumbent Liberal Democrats who gained two Conservative seats. No election was held in Botley, a two-member ward, this year.

== Results summary ==
The Liberal Democrats further strengthened their already large majority, with an increased vote share. They gained two Conservative seats, Fair Oak & Horton Heath and Hiltingbury. The Liberal Democrats successfully defended 10 seats up for reelection, whilst Independent Councillor Raymond Dean retained his Bishopstoke seat with an increased majority

The overall vote share also rose for the Liberal Democrats, as well as for UKIP and the Greens, whilst the Conservative vote share fell, alongside that of Labour and Independents.

Eastleigh Borough Council election 2019
Party	Seats	Gains	Losses	Net gain/loss	Seats %	Votes %	Votes	+/−
Liberal Democrats	34	2	0	▲2	87.2	52.1	17,305	▲1.0
Conservative	2	0	2	▼2	5.1	19.5	6,495	▼7.7
UKIP	0	0	0	Steady	0.0	9.6	3,201	▲7.5
Labour	0	0	0	Steady	0.0	6.9	2,296	▼5.1
Green	0	0	0	Steady	0.0	6.0	1,977	▲4.6
Independent	3	0	0	Steady	7.7	5.9	1,952	▼0.3

== Ward results ==
A * denotes an incumbent councillor seeking reelection.

=== Bishopstoke ===
Bishopstoke
Party	Candidate	Votes	%	±%
Independent	Raymond Dean*	1,666	46.3	+6.3
Liberal Democrats	Trevor Mignot	1,287	37.8	+3.2
UKIP	John Edwards	277	7.7	−0.3
Conservative	Phillip Parkinson-Shanley	225	6.3	−3.7
Labour	Christine McKeone	144	4.0	−13.3
Majority		379	10.49	
Turnout		3,611	43.26	
Independent hold		Swing		

=== Bursledon & Hound North ===
Bursledon & Hound North
Party	Candidate	Votes	%	±%
Liberal Democrats	Lindsey Rich*	1,182	61.2	+4.9
Conservative	Lisa Moody	396	20.5	−4.7
UKIP	Janet Weller	214	11.1	+4.9
Labour	Peter Chilton	142	7.3	−2.4
Majority		786	40.26	
Turnout		1,952	30.09	
Liberal Democrats hold		Swing		

=== Chandler's Ford ===
Chandler's Ford
Party	Candidate	Votes	%	±%
Liberal Democrats	Timothy Groves*	1,736	54.8	+5.4
Conservative	Daniel Newcombe	748	23.6	−7.3
UKIP	Peter House	295	9.3	+4.2
Green	Paul Openshaw	212	6.7	N/A
Labour	Jennifer Prior	177	5.6	−3.4
Majority		987	31.05	
Turnout		3,178	38.00	
Liberal Democrats hold		Swing		

=== Eastleigh Central ===
Eastleigh Central
Party	Candidate	Votes	%	±%
Liberal Democrats	Jephthe Doguie*	1,111	48.9	+9.7
Labour	Joshua Constable	400	17.6	−8.5
UKIP	Andrew Moore	318	14.0	+1.7
Conservative	Nicholas Arnold	267	11.8	−7.1
Green	Nicholas Tann	175	7.7	−4.2
Majority		711	31.18	
Turnout		2,280	29.63	
Liberal Democrats hold		Swing		

=== Eastleigh North ===
Eastleigh North
Party	Candidate	Votes	%	±%
Liberal Democrats	Sara Tyson-Payne*	1,195	49.2	+11.0
Conservative	Simon Payne	297	12.2	−3.8
Independent	David Betts	286	11.8	−9.2
Labour	Kathleen O'Neill	238	9.8	−2.5
UKIP	John Smith	229	9.4	+2.6
Green	Alexander Hughes	184	7.6	−1.3
Majority		898	36.90	
Turnout		2,433	32.68	
Liberal Democrats hold		Swing		

=== Eastleigh South ===
Eastleigh South
Party	Candidate	Votes	%	±%
Liberal Democrats	Darshan Mann*	1,130	54.6	+11.7
Labour	Gordon Clark	344	16.6	−10.2
UKIP	Glenn Bryan	338	16.3	+6.0
Conservative	Stephen Wildin	259	12.5	−5.8
Majority		786	37.78	
Turnout		2,080	28.63	
Liberal Democrats hold		Swing		

=== Fair Oak & Horton Heath ===
Fair Oak & Horton Heath
Party	Candidate	Votes	%	±%
Liberal Democrats	Michelle Marsh	1,205	40.3	+2.3
Conservative	Steven Broomfield*	821	27.5	−12.6
Green	Jack Stapleton	415	13.9	±0.0
UKIP	Martin Lyon	391	13.1	+0.6
Labour	Jillian Payne	156	5.2	−8.6
Majority		384	12.76	
Turnout		3,009	38.49	
Liberal Democrats gain from Conservative		Swing		

=== Hamble & Netley ===
Hamble & Netley
Party	Candidate	Votes	%	±%
Liberal Democrats	Adam Manning*	1,640	59.1	+3.3
Conservative	Jeanette Fox	453	16.3	−11.6
Green	Susan Robson	263	9.5	N/A
UKIP	Andrew Whitehouse	247	8.9	N/A
Labour	Trudi White	171	6.2	−3.8
Majority		1187	42.51	
Turnout		2,792	35.01	
Liberal Democrats hold		Swing		

=== Hedge End North ===
Hedge End North
Party	Candidate	Votes	%	±%
Liberal Democrats	Ian Corben*	1,255	59.6	+7.0
Conservative	James Allen	378	18.0	−8.7
Green	Rosanna Campbell	187	8.9	−0.2
UKIP	John Tomlin	146	6.9	+3.0
Labour	Geoff Budd	138	6.6	−5.2
Majority		877	41.44	
Turnout		2,116	28.14	
Liberal Democrats hold		Swing		

=== Hedge End South ===
Hedge End South
Party	Candidate	Votes	%	±%
Liberal Democrats	Cynthia Garton*	1,878	61.6	+6.3
Conservative	Christopher Yates	666	21.8	−8.3
UKIP	Benjamin Jones	261	8.6	+4.7
Labour	Betty Layland	128	4.2	−0.4
Green	Chetana Greenwood	117	3.8	N/A
Majority		1212	39.46	
Turnout		3,071	35.20	
Liberal Democrats hold		Swing		

=== Hiltingbury ===
Hiltingbury
Party	Candidate	Votes	%	±%
Liberal Democrats	James Duguid	1,905	50.6	+8.9
Conservative	Michael Hughes*	1,370	36.4	−10.3
Green	Janice Openshaw	199	5.3	N/A
UKIP	Jean Leech	184	4.9	N/A
Labour	John Prior	109	2.9	−3.2
Majority		535	14.13	
Turnout		3,786	46.08	
Liberal Democrats gain from Conservative		Swing		

=== West End North ===
West End North
Party	Candidate	Votes	%	±%
Liberal Democrats	Richard Gomer*	882	59.6	+0.6
Conservative	Benjamin Burcombe-Filer	273	18.4	−4.8
UKIP	George McGuinness	140	9.5	+5.1
Green	Glynn Fleming	125	8.4	+0.7
Labour	Geoffrey Kosted	60	4.1	−2.5
Majority		609	40.92	
Turnout		1,488	33.72	
Liberal Democrats hold		Swing		

=== West End South ===
West End South
Party	Candidate	Votes	%	±%
Liberal Democrats	Timothy Bearder	899	56.5	+1.5
Conservative	Jeremy Hall	342	21.5	−9.1
UKIP	Christopher Greenwood	161	10.1	+0.6
Green	Tracy Weeks	100	6.3	−1.6
Labour	Stephen Willoughby	89	5.6	−3.6
Majority		557	34.79	
Turnout		1,601	32.29	
Liberal Democrats hold		Swing		

== Changes 2019–2021 ==
On 30 March 2021, Liberal Democrat councillor Tina Campbell (Eastleigh Central) resigned the Liberal Democrat whip and her cabinet role as member for social policy, sitting thereafter as an independent; fellow Liberal Democrat councillor Sara Tyson-Payne (Eastleigh North) resigned the whip the following day. Both resignations followed a 25 March vote of the Eastleigh Local Area Committee, which Campbell chaired, rejecting a proposed extension to the runway at Southampton Airport; the decision was referred to full council, which was due to make the final decision on 8 April 2021.
