= Eastleigh by-election =

Eastleigh by-election may refer to:

- 1994 Eastleigh by-election
- 2013 Eastleigh by-election
