= Chris Huhne =

British politician (born 1954)

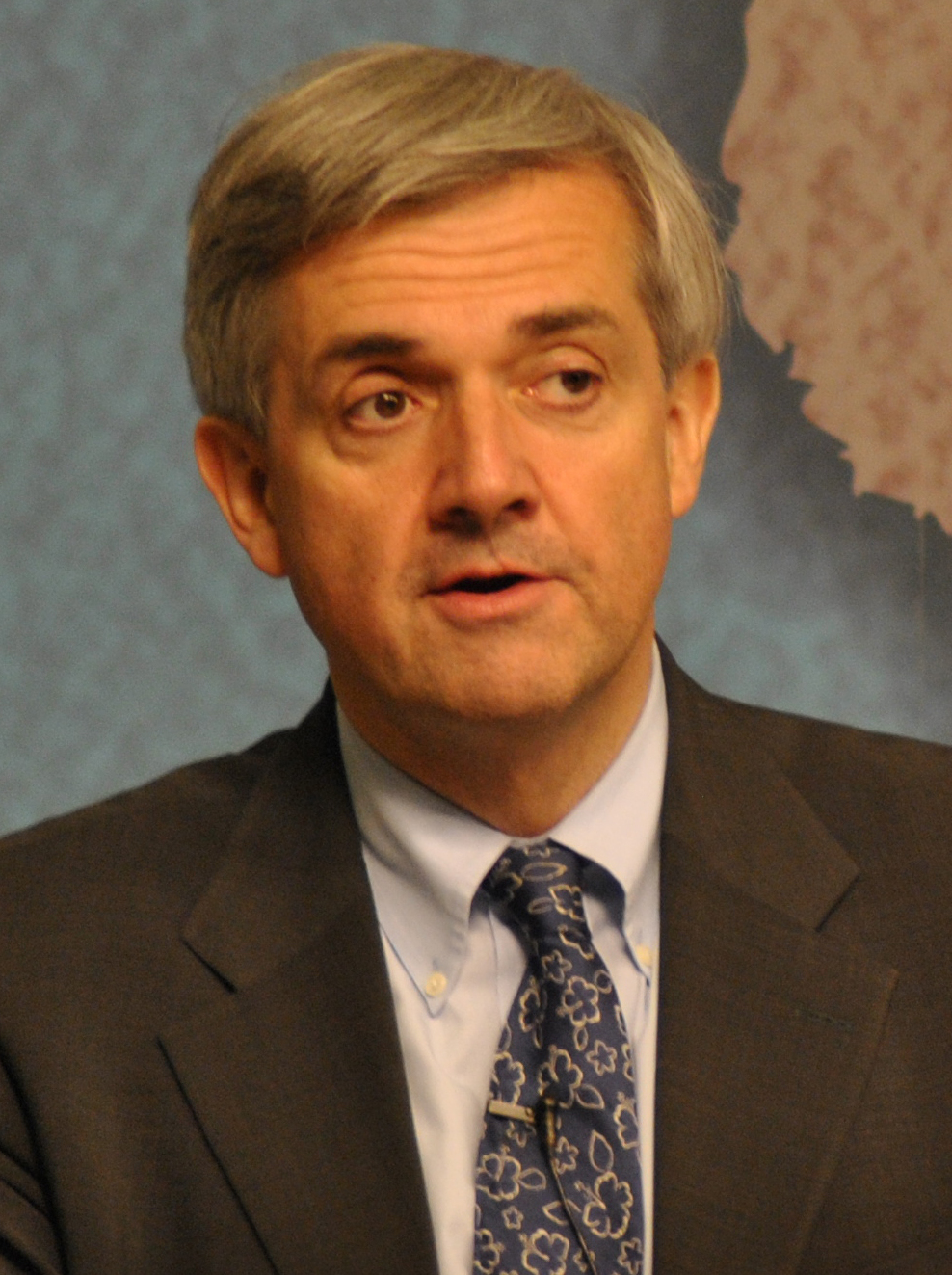
- Huhne in 2011

Secretary of State for Energy and Climate Change
- In office 12 May 2010 – 3 February 2012
- Prime Minister: David Cameron
- Preceded by: Ed Miliband
- Succeeded by: Ed Davey
Liberal Democrat frontbench positions
Liberal Democrat Home Affairs spokesperson
In office 20 December 2007 – 12 May 2010
Leader	Nick Clegg
Preceded by	Nick Clegg
Succeeded by	Lynne Featherstone (2015)
Liberal Democrat Environment, Food and Rural Affairs Spokesman
In office 3 March 2006 – 19 December 2007
Leader	Menzies Campbell; Vince Cable (Acting)
Preceded by	Norman Baker
Succeeded by	Steve Webb
Liberal Democrat Deputy Treasury Spokesman
In office 16 May 2005 – 3 March 2006
Leader	Charles Kennedy
Preceded by	David Laws
Succeeded by	Julia Goldsworthy

Member of Parliament for Eastleigh
- In office 5 May 2005 – 5 February 2013
- Preceded by: David Chidgey
- Succeeded by: Mike Thornton

Member of the European Parliament for South East England
- In office 10 June 1999 – 12 May 2005
- Preceded by: Constituency established
- Succeeded by: Sharon Bowles

Personal details
- Born: Christopher Murray Paul-Huhne; 2 July 1954 (age 72) London, England
- Party: Labour (before 1981); SDP (1981–1988); Liberal Democrats (1988–2013); Independent (since 2013)
- Spouse: Vicky Pryce (m. 1984; div. 2011)
- Domestic partner: Carina Trimingham (2010–present)
- Children: 3
- Education: Magdalen College, Oxford

Christopher Murray Paul Huhne (born 2 July 1954) is a British energy and climate change consultant and former politician who was the Liberal Democrat Member of Parliament for Eastleigh from 2005 to 2013, and the Secretary of State for Energy and Climate Change from 2010 to 2012. He is currently chair of the UK green gas association – the Anaerobic Digestion and Bioresources Association – and senior adviser to the World Biogas Association. He also advises companies on his particular interest in renewable technologies that can provide back up for intermittent energy sources like wind and solar.

As Energy Secretary, Huhne was responsible for two innovations that have subsequently had a wide influence internationally: an Electricity Market Reform (EMR) that introduced market-friendly support mechanisms for renewables ("auctioned contracts for difference") that has been copied widely in Europe and even in China, and the Renewable Heat Incentive (RHI) which was the first support for biomethane injection into the gas grid.

Huhne formerly wrote weekly columns for The Guardian, Independent on Sunday and Evening Standard. From 1994 to 1999, he built up a business advising on the creditworthiness of countries which is now the sovereign ratings division of one of the three large global ratings agencies, Fitch Ratings.

Huhne had twice stood unsuccessfully for election as Leader of the Liberal Democrats: in 2006 he came second to Sir Menzies Campbell and in 2007 he narrowly lost to Nick Clegg. His political career ended with resignation in February 2013, when he was (with his ex-wife) convicted of perverting the course of justice in relation to speeding offences. He ultimately pleaded guilty, and was sentenced to eight months in prison, serving nine weeks before being released in May 2013.

Huhne was reported in December 2023 to have settled with News Corporation (Rupert Murdoch's newspaper holding company that owned the main newspapers responsible for bringing him down, the Sun, News of the World and Sunday Times) over illegal information-gathering including phone-hacking. Huhne received six-figure damages and his legal costs. Huhne said that News targeted him because he had called for a reopening of the police investigation into phone-hacking (that led to the conviction of Andy Coulson, editor of the News of the World) and a judicial inquiry (eventually the Leveson Inquiry).

Huhne was joined by other former Liberal Democrat ministers including Vince Cable and Norman Lamb, and claimed that News of the World had not hacked him just for tabloid titillation but as an attempt to remove him as a critic and to spy on the Government in its intentions on whether to refer Murdoch's Sky bid to the competition authorities.

== Legacy as Energy Secretary ==
As Energy and Climate Change Secretary, Huhne was responsible for pushing through an Electricity Market Reform (in the White Paper in 2011) that has been widely copied in Europe and even China. The central idea was to provide certainty to investors, and thereby to investors, by fixing a price for renewables that involve heavy up-front capital expenditure (such as offshore and onshore wind, and large-scale solar). The fixed price, backed by the government, reduces the cost of capital to the project, while developers are encouraged to bid the lowest possible price for the project in a dutch auction. This ensures that taxpayers get value for money. If the market price exceeds the strike price agreed, the developers pay back the government, but the government subsidises the developers if the price is under the market price.

These "auctioned and two-way contracts for difference" were a clear market-oriented break from civil servants determining a fixed price, and have been widely held responsible for the rapid reduction in costs of leading renewables as developers and manufacturers have attempted to win contracts by under-bidding rivals. For example, offshore wind project developers in the United Kingdom signed contracts to sell their energy at an average price of $143 USD per megawatt hour (MWh) in 2010, when only a little more than 500 megawatts (MWs) of offshore wind turbines were operational. By 2019, U.K. project developers were signing contracts on average worth $50/MWh, by which time installed capacity in the U.K. had reached nearly 10,000 MWs. Globally, the average levelized cost of energy (LCOE) of offshore wind fell from a 2012 high of $255/MWh to only $84/MWh in 2020, a reduction of 67.5%.

The success of Britain's "auctioned and two-way contracts for difference" in both supporting rapid expansion of renewables and helping to drive down their cost was taken up by the European Union, which first recommended such competitive auctions in 2014 and then mandated them in 2024. The scheme was even copied by the Chinese government in its renewables reforms introduced in February 2025, according to the International Energy Agency's Renewables report 2025. The IEA report added: "Competitive auctions are now the main procurement mechanism of global utility-scale renewable deployment, accounting for almost 60% of gross capacity additions expected during 2025-2030 – up from less than 25% in the 2024 forecast. This marks a major shift from last year's analysis, when feed-in tariffs and premiums were still the dominant mechanism (but now they represent just 10% of growth). Unlike feed-in tariffs and premiums, where the government sets offtake prices, competitive auctions let developers bid for the level of remuneration they receive, ultimately leading to lower costs."

Another pioneering policy was the Renewable Heat Incentive, the first ever support for the injection of renewable gas (or biomethane) into the gas grid. However, Huhne's energy saving policy (the "green deal") which legislated to allow homeowners to insulate their homes and put the cost onto their energy bills (so long as the savings outstripped the on-going cost) was a failure with minimal uptake. Huhne was also the Energy secretary who had to handle the BP Macondo disaster in the Gulf of Mexico, and the fall-out from the Fukushima nuclear disaster in Japan. Huhne did not bow to the pressure to phase-out nuclear power – unlike the German government at the time - but instead appointed an independent scientific review of the lessons of Fukushima which subsequently drew attention to the differences with the Japanese situation.

== Early life ==
=== Education and upbringing ===
Huhne was born in west London to businessman Peter Paul-Huhne and actress Ann Murray on 2 July 1954. He was educated at Westminster School.

He attended Magdalen College, Oxford, where he was a Demy. While there, Huhne edited the student magazine Isis, served on the executive of the Oxford University Labour Club, and achieved a first-class degree in Philosophy, Politics and Economics (PPE). He was active in student politics, supporting the Labour Party. He also attended the Sorbonne, Paris.

=== Career before Parliament ===
Huhne started as an undercover freelance reporter in India during Indira Gandhi's emergency when western journalists had been expelled, before working for the Liverpool Echo and The Economist as its Brussels correspondent between 1977 and 1980. He was then economics editor, leader writer and columnist for The Guardian, and economics editor, assistant editor and columnist for The Independent on Sunday. He was the business editor of The Independent and The Independent on Sunday during its investigations into Robert Maxwell's fraud on the Mirror group pension fund. He won both the junior and senior Wincott awards for financial journalist of the year in 1980 and 1989 respectively. Along with his work in newspapers and magazines he co-wrote the book Debt & Danger: The World Financial Crisis (Penguin, 1985) with Harold Lever, and wrote Real World Economics (Penguin 1990).

Before embarking on his political career, he started a company in the City. He told The Independent in 2008: "I don't claim that I'm in other than a very happy position compared with most people, because, having spent a bit of time in the City before I was elected, being able to make a bit of money while I was there, I have a cushion." He started a company called IBCA Sovereign Ratings in 1994 that tried to "measure the risks of investing in different countries". In 1997 he became group managing director of Fitch IBCA, and from 1999 to 2003 was vice-chairman of Fitch Ratings.

=== Early political career and Parliamentary candidacies ===
Huhne joined the Social Democratic Party (SDP) soon after it was formed in 1981. In the 1982 Islington London Borough Council election, he stood as one of two SDP candidates in Canonbury East, a double-member ward, but failed to be elected after coming third behind the victorious Labour candidates. His prospects were not helped by the fact that the two sitting councillors in the ward also stood as unofficial 'Social Democrats', having been expelled by the SDP a month earlier.

Huhne contested the 1983 general election as a Parliamentary candidate for the SDP–Liberal Alliance in Reading East coming second, and in the 1987 general election he was the SDP–Liberal Alliance candidate in Oxford West and Abingdon, a seat that would be won ten years later by Liberal Democrat candidate Evan Harris.

== Member of European Parliament (1999–2005) ==
In June 1999, Huhne was elected as a member of the European Parliament for South East England. The Liberal Democrats came third with a total of 228,136 votes behind the Conservatives and Labour. The proportion of votes received meant that the party was able to send the top two list candidates to the European Parliament, the top list candidate Emma Nicholson, and Chris Huhne who was second on the list. In the 2004 European Parliament elections, Huhne was re-elected, along with Emma Nicholson, with the party receiving 338,342 votes this time around, 15% of the total vote. In 2005, Huhne stood for election to the United Kingdom parliament representing the seat of Eastleigh in Hampshire. After he was elected as a Member of the House of Commons on 5 May 2005, Sharon Bowles, the candidate third on the Liberal Democrat list, replaced Huhne as representative for the South East of England.

During his time in the European Parliament, Huhne was the only Liberal Democrat MEP in a ranking by The Economist of the three highest-profile UK MEPs (the others being Glenys Kinnock and Caroline Lucas). He was a member of the Economic and Monetary Affairs Committee, concerned with economic and financial policy including regulation of the financial sector. He was economic spokesman for the pan-European Liberal group in the European Parliament and was responsible for introducing "sunset clauses" – time limits on powers – into European Union law for the first time, for radically amending Commission proposals on financial services, and for opening up the European Central Bank to greater scrutiny.

In addition to his European Parliament responsibilities, he was also active in the development of Liberal Democrat policy as chairman of four policy groups: broadcasting and the media, globalisation, the introduction of the euro, and the reform of public services. On public services, he argued that money was a necessary condition of improvement, but that the key was decentralisation and democratic control; local voters needed to be able to hold local decision-takers to account.

== Member of Parliament ==
Huhne was first elected to represent Eastleigh at the general election on 5 May 2005, a constituency within the area for which he was previously the Member of the European Parliament. David Chidgey, the previous MP for the constituency, was also a Liberal Democrat who won his seat in what was historically a Conservative area in a by-election in 1994 following the death of Stephen Milligan. The result in 2005 was close, with Huhne winning with a majority of 568 over Conservative rival Conor Burns. In the 2010 general election Huhne retained his seat with an increased majority of 3,864 over Conservative Maria Hutchings. He was appointed as Steward and Bailiff of the Chiltern Hundreds on 5 February 2013, which vacated his seat and thus ended his tenure as Member of Parliament for Eastleigh. In accepting this office, he became the first official Liberal or Liberal Democrat MP to resign a parliamentary seat since 1941.

=== Treasury spokesman ===
Following his election to the House of Commons then Liberal Democrat leader Charles Kennedy made Huhne the party's shadow Chief Secretary to the Treasury. In this role Huhne led the party's debate on the 2005 Finance Bill, suggesting that amendments should be made to stop a pensions loophole which would have allowed a 40% discount on property and other investments. In the pre-budget report for 2006, the Chancellor conceded the change.

=== 2006 leadership contest ===
Huhne stood against Sir Menzies Campbell and Simon Hughes for the Liberal Democrat leadership following Charles Kennedy's resignation, formally launching his campaign on 13 January 2006.

Huhne was able to carve out a distinctive position on the issue of green taxation. He argued for a radical expansion of taxes on pollution, allowing for reductions in the income tax rate on the lowest paid. This theme endeared Huhne to environmentalists and market liberals alike, allowing him to pick up supporters as the campaign went on. He also argued for a repeal of elements of the Labour government's anti-terrorism legislation, which many felt had undermined British civil liberties, and for the withdrawal of British troops from Iraq within a year. He described himself as a 'social liberal'.

Although the majority of Liberal Democrat MPs declared their support for Menzies Campbell, Huhne did receive endorsements from some party notables including Lord Maclennan and William Rodgers. Amongst the media, The Economist and The Independent supported his leadership bid. He was backed from early on by a number of bloggers, and gained much momentum from an internet campaign.

In the final vote, Huhne finished runner-up, tallying 21,628 votes to Menzies Campbell's 29,697. Campbell appointed him as the Liberal Democrat's environment spokesman in the subsequent frontbench reshuffle, in order for Huhne to develop a viable programme to expand on his green campaign themes.

During the election campaign, a news story in The Independent on 27 February 2006, reported that an unsigned document entitled "Chris Huhne's Hypocritical Personal Share Portfolio" was being circulated at Lib Dem leadership election meetings. The document alleged that Huhne had invested in companies that the document described as "unethical". The document stated: "Chris Huhne is campaigning for the Lib Dem leadership on a green, carbon-neutral platform, and further advocates increasing tax for the wealthy, which would include himself. However, his shareholdings include, or have included, mining companies, oil companies and tax shelters."

=== Environment spokesman ===
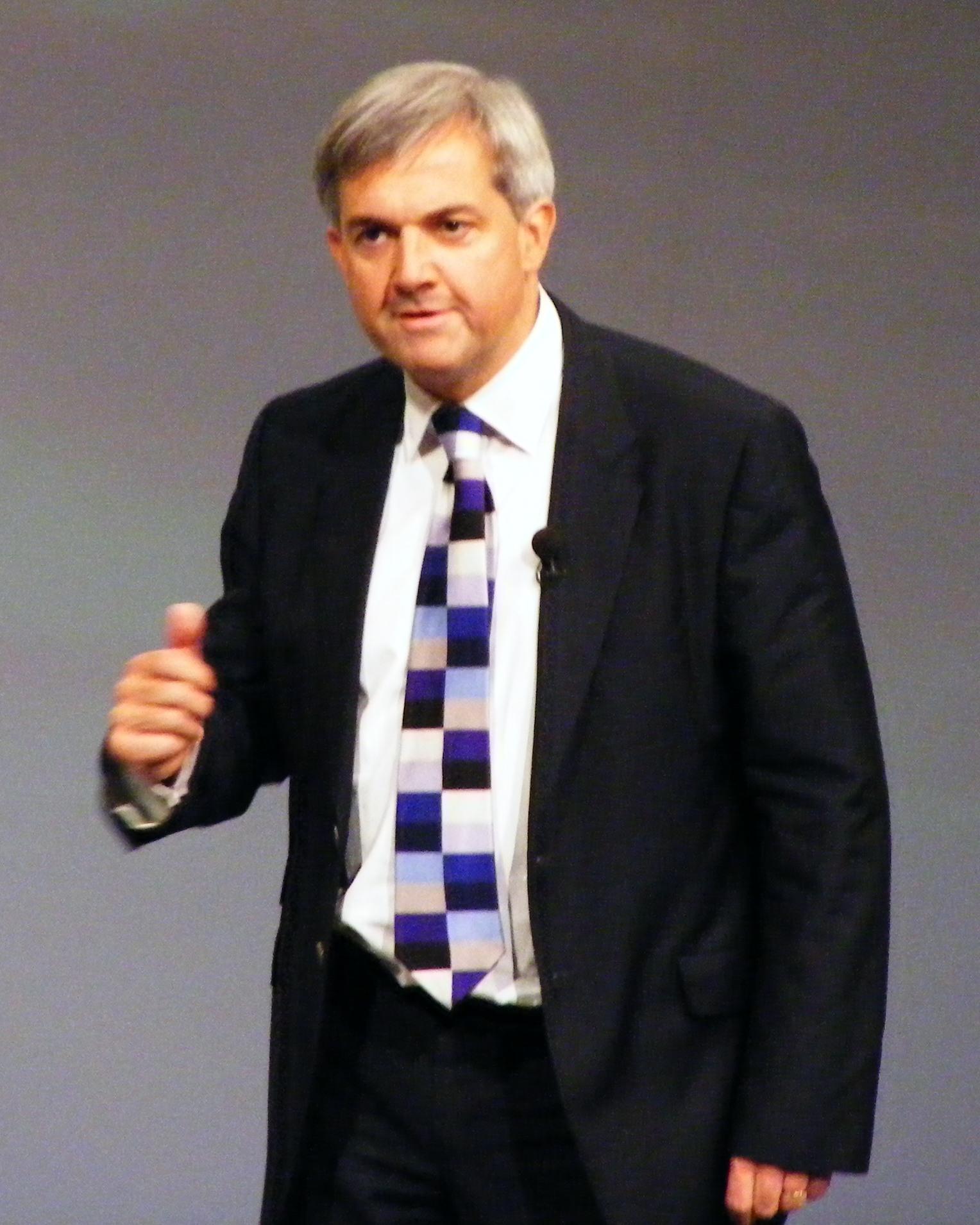
Huhne in 2008

The intellectual energy surrounding Huhne's leadership campaign did much to inform the Liberal Democrats' recent political agenda. His proposals for realigning green taxes and income tax – the green tax switch – were at the heart of the fiscal package endorsed at the party's September 2006 conference.

Huhne was involved in developing his party's thoughts on climate change and the environment, including a consideration of the challenges and opportunities they create for British businesses. He also drew attention to what he said was the divergence between the Conservative Party's environmental rhetoric and its policies.

Huhne was one of fourteen MPs forming an all-party parliamentary inquiry into antisemitism in the UK. Their report criticised boycotts of Israeli academics as "an assault on academic freedom and intellectual exchange" and accused "some left-wing activists and Muslim extremists [...] of using criticism of Israel as 'a pretext' for spreading hatred against British Jews". Huhne is, however, a critic of Israeli government policy in the Middle East, and strongly supports the creation of a separate Palestinian state. He described the Israeli response in Lebanon to Hezbollah's rocket attacks as disproportionate and counter-productive, arguing that a strong Lebanese state is in Israel's long-term interest.

In March 2007, it was falsely reported that he had written to executives at Channel 4 to try and stop their showing The Great Global Warming Swindle. In an e-mail exchange with Iain Dale, Huhne stated that he only wrote to ask for the channel's comments, and The Daily Telegraph later ran a correction and apologised for the misunderstanding, saying it was happy to accept that "Mr Huhne's letter was not an attempt to prevent the film being shown or suppress debate on the issue".

After Liberal Democrat home affairs spokesman Nick Clegg announced his intention, during the 2007 party conference, to stand for the leadership should Menzies Campbell retire, Chris Huhne, when asked about his leadership ambitions, said that there was: "no vacancy, and it would be premature to even talk about the position of there being a vacancy".

=== 2007 leadership contest ===
Following Sir Menzies Campbell's resignation on 15 October 2007, Huhne was considered to be one of the strongest contenders for the leadership of the Liberal Democrats. On 17 October, he became the first member of the party to announce his candidacy, saying "I've decided to give it a go" and declaring his vision of a "fairer and greener society". Huhne said that he wanted the party to be committed to the idea that "everybody's individual worth and chance is given its full possibility."

On 28 October 2007, Huhne announced that he had secured the support of 10 of his 62 parliamentary colleagues for his formal nomination. His rival Nick Clegg announced the support of 33 MPs. Huhne also claimed backing from at least twelve peers, four MSPs, and three Welsh Assembly members. After former Lib Dem leader Lord Ashdown announced his support for Clegg, a previous Liberal leader Lord Steel declared his support for Huhne, based in part on Huhne's position on the Trident nuclear programme.

In the last week of campaigning, his team were bullish about his chances, predicting a win. In the final count, the party membership chose his rival Nick Clegg by a narrow margin of 511 votes out of more than 41,000 counted.

About 1,300 postal votes were caught up in the Christmas post and missed the election deadline. An unofficial check of the late papers showed Huhne had enough votes among them to hand him victory. Huhne stood by the result, saying: "Nick Clegg won fair and square on the rules counting the ballot papers that arrived in by the deadline. There is no question of any re-run." Following the leadership election, Clegg chose Huhne to be the party's Home Affairs Spokesman.

==== Election conduct ====
During the leadership election, Nick Clegg registered a formal complaint about Huhne's conduct to Chris Rennard, the party's Chief Whip and returning officer. Clegg stated that his rival was indulging in: "the politics of innuendo, mounting false challenges and running a campaign that is handing political ammunition to the party's political opponents." Huhne and Clegg were debating on live television on BBC's The Politics Show on Sunday 18 November 2007, when presenter Jon Sopel produced a briefing document that had been specially delivered to the show's production team by the Huhne campaign team on the preceding Friday. The document excoriated Clegg on a number of policy and political issues and was titled "Calamity Clegg". When challenged about the document, Huhne claimed that he had no knowledge of it and said he did not agree with the document title but agreed with the points within it. Asked how it was possible that he had no knowledge of such a major document sent to the producer of the show he was due to appear on, Huhne replied: "It's quite impossible to check everything that goes out of the office... But I can assure you that's not had my authorization." After Clegg complained about what he called "dirty tricks" and other senior party members condemned the Huhne campaign attack, Huhne's campaign manager Anna Werrin claimed that the title of the memo was just the product of an "over-zealous researcher" and had not been seen or approved by Huhne or any senior campaign officials prior to release. "The document title had not been approved before the document was sent out and neither Chris nor I were aware of it."

Speaking to the Independent on 21 November 2007, Huhne claimed: "Unfortunately it was a mixture of responsibilities. It was an over-zealous young researcher who was responsible for drawing up the document." The researcher was not on his staff, he said, denying that, as a former journalist, he might have been expected to read what was put out in his name before it was issued.

=== Home Affairs spokesman ===
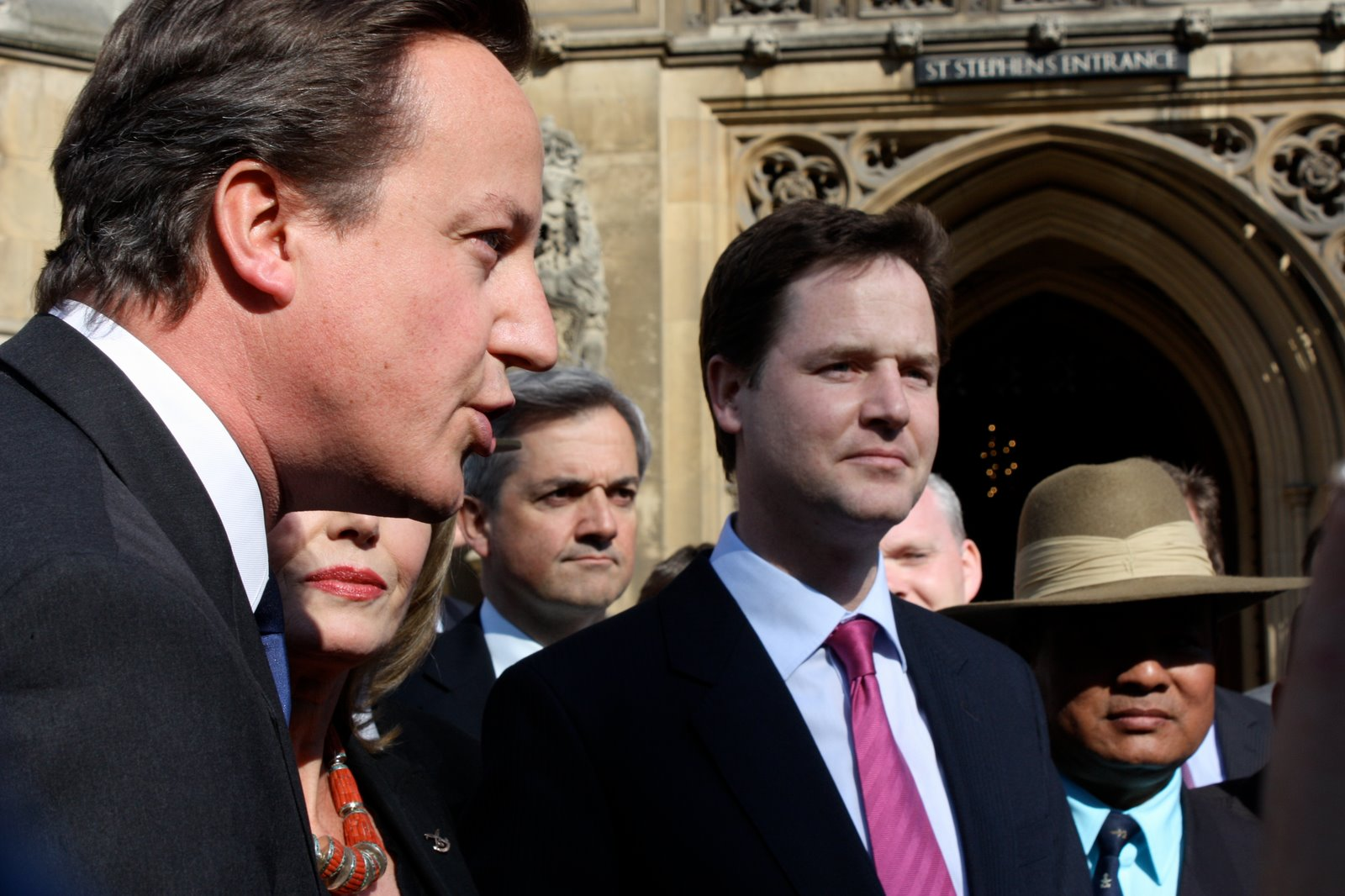
David Cameron and Nick Clegg outside the Houses of Parliament, with Huhne in the background

In October 2008, as Liberal Democrat Home Affairs spokesperson, Huhne led the Liberal Democrat response to the government's announcement of plans to expand the capacity to collect records of people using electronic communications. The Home Secretary's announcement was in response to warnings by police and the security services that the growing fragmentation and complexity of communications was hindering their tackling of terrorism and organised criminality. But Huhne disagreed with the government's response to the police and security services, saying: "The Government's Orwellian plans for a vast database of our private communications are deeply worrying. I hope that this consultation is not just a sham exercise to soft-soap an unsuspecting public."

In January 2009, Huhne was credited with uncovering an instance of data loss of government information caused by a courier company losing a computer disc containing bank details of up to 2,000 public servants working for the British Council. Huhne blamed the Foreign Secretary, David Miliband, and the government for the courier company's loss and said that the incident was an example of why the UK should not have identity cards: "This is another instance in a long line of slapdash data protection by government departments. If Whitehall cannot look after its own data records it should not be trusted with the personal information of every citizen as it wants with the identity card scheme."

On 6 November 2007, Huhne made remarks about the Speaker of the House of Commons on the BBC television programme Newsnight in which he claimed that the Speaker, Michael Martin, had fallen asleep during a speech by the Prime Minister Gordon Brown. "The Speaker unfortunately fell asleep during Gordon Brown's speech ... I'm not sure I'm allowed to say that, but he reacted in an entirely understandable way to what was not the most riveting of parliamentary occasions." After the remarks were repeated in several publications, Huhne made a public apology to the Speaker in the House of Commons on 8 November in which he withdrew his prior comments. "It was wrong of me to draw the Chair into a matter of political dispute. I hope you will accept I intended no personal offence and fully withdraw my comments."

==== Support for scientific advisor ====
Huhne was an avid supporter of Professor David Nutt after he was dismissed by Home Secretary Alan Johnson as chairman of the Advisory Council on the Misuse of Drugs (ACMD) in November 2009. Nutt had criticised the government's decision to reclassify cannabis as a Class B drug rather than keeping it as a class C. Huhne said the decision to sack Nutt was "disgraceful" and commented: "what is the point of having independent scientific advice if as soon as you get some advice that you don't like, you sack the person who has given it to you?". Attacking the government, he said that if they did not want to take expert scientific advice they might as well have a "committee of tabloid newspaper editors to advise on drugs policy". Cannabis had been re-classified as a class C drug in 2004 by then Home Secretary David Blunkett, only for Jacqui Smith to reverse the ruling in 2008, a decision taken despite official advisers recommending against it.

==== Expenses claims ====
As part of The Daily Telegraph investigation into expense claims by MPs, Huhne was reported to have claimed for various items including groceries, fluffy dusters and a trouser press. In 2006, he claimed £5,066 for painting work on his garden fences and chairs. He collected £119 for a Corby trouser press from John Lewis but later said he would repay the cost in order "to avoid controversy". He later claimed on a live Channel 4 news programme that he needed the trouser press to "look smart" for work. Huhne's office running costs during the 2007/2008 financial year were the 206th highest out of 645, his second home claims were 580th highest (or 65th cheapest) out of 645, and his total expense claims were below average, ranking 418th most expensive.

Huhne was one of sixteen ministers whose assets were held in a blind trust.

== Coalition Government (2010–2012) ==
Following the 2010 general election, Huhne became a member of the Liberal Democrats' key negotiating team alongside Danny Alexander, David Laws and Andrew Stunell that brokered the agreement to go into a governing coalition with the Conservatives. Following the negotiations and the formation of a full coalition Huhne was appointed Secretary of State for Energy and Climate Change, the tenth most senior minister in the new government. There had been some speculation that Huhne might be appointed as Home Secretary, as he had been the Liberal Democrat spokesman for Home Affairs in the preceding three years, although this post went to the Conservative Theresa May. He was appointed as a Privy Counsellor on 13 May 2010.

=== Secretary of State for Energy and Climate Change ===
A vocal environmentalist, Huhne accepted the role of Secretary of State with the stated intention of making the nation more ecologically conscious. Among his first actions was launching National Wind Week by speaking at an event in London's Leicester Square on 15 June 2010. Underscoring his personal commitment to wind power, Huhne erected an 8-foot wind turbine at his constituency home in Eastleigh.

==== Position on nuclear energy ====
In government, Huhne maintained a flexible approach on the subject of nuclear energy, advocating the three-pronged portfolio approach to energy: a commitment to nuclear energy; the development of more renewable energy, such as wind and sea power; and new carbon-capture technology to mitigate the damaging environmental effects of fossil fuel-fired power plants and industrial facilities. In an interview with The Observer in March 2011, following the Fukushima disaster in Japan, Huhne stated that: "there are a lot of issues outside of the realm of nuclear safety, which we will have to assess. One is what the economics of nuclear power post-Fukushima will be, if there is an increase in the cost in capital to nuclear operators." This represents an evolution of his approach to the nuclear issue. In 2007, Huhne was quoted as saying: "Nuclear is a tried, tested and failed technology and the government must stop putting time, effort and subsidies into this outdated industry."

==== Cancellation of Sheffield Forgemasters loan ====
In June 2010, Huhne supported the cancellation by the Business Department of an £80 million loan to Sheffield Forgemasters which had been pledged by the preceding Labour government to build power plant components. He was criticised by Labour Shadow energy secretary Ed Miliband who said that the money for the loan had been set aside and would have resulted in at least £110 million returning to the Exchequer. On 1 July 2010, Huhne replied to Miliband saying: "The loan to Sheffield Forgemasters was not a commercial loan. If it was a commercial loan it would have been arranged through the banks and not by the government. It was precisely because of the public subsidy element, and the fact that the public subsidy element was not affordable, that the government decided not to proceed with it." The cancellation of the loan was one of a number of projects agreed by the previous Labour government cancelled in an announcement to the House of Commons on 17 June 2010.

==== Cancun climate change conference ====
On 9 December 2010, Huhne represented the United Kingdom at COP16. The gathering, at which over 190 countries were represented, announced a deal to curb climate change which Prime Minister David Cameron described as a "very significant step forward." The agreement struck in Mexico included a recognition that deeper cuts in carbon emissions were needed and that a fund should be set up to help developing countries reduce their carbon emissions. Huhne described the deal as a "serious package" of measures but acknowledged that there was still more work to do prior to the next climate change meeting in Durban, South Africa, the following year. Following the conference, David Cameron said that his government would be the "greenest ever" and that Britain would meet its international obligations regarding climate change.

==== Support for AV referendum campaign ====
Huhne was an enthusiastic supporter of the AV campaign (Alternative Vote Referendum) and attacked anti-AV campaigners such as his cabinet colleague, Conservative Party chairman Baroness Warsi.

If Baroness Warsi thinks that AV will benefit fascism she has to explain why the BNP wants to stick with what we have and Operation Black Vote supports AV. The BNP know the present system is their only chance of election. This is another example of the increasingly Goebbels-like campaign from the anti-AV people, for whom no lie is too idiotic given the truth is so unpalatable to them. AV makes lazy MPs work harder and reach out beyond their tribe. It is what Britain needs to clean up politics.

==== Resignation ====
On 3 February 2012, Huhne resigned from the Cabinet when he was charged with perverting the course of justice over a 2003 speeding case. His wife at the time, Vicky Pryce, had falsely claimed that she was driving the car, and accepted the licence penalty points on his behalf so that he could avoid being banned from driving. Huhne denied the charge until the trial began on 4 February 2013, when he changed his plea to guilty, resigned as a member of Parliament, and left the Privy Council. He and Pryce were sentenced at Southwark Crown Court on 11 March to eight months in prison for perverting the course of justice. He served nine weeks of his sentence at HMP Leyhill in Gloucestershire before he was released.

On 5 February 2013, Huhne resigned as an MP, following his plea of guilty to perverting the course of justice. In a subsequent article for the Guardian during his second period of writing a weekly column for the paper, he said that he believed he was targeted by Rupert Murdoch's News Group newspapers because of the support he had given, while Shadow Home Secretary, for the re-opening of the police investigation into phone-hacking. The subsequent police investigation led to the prosecution and conviction of Andy Coulson, formerly editor of the News of the World.

== Career since Parliament ==
Huhne has been an adviser and consultant on energy and climate change since his resignation from parliament. In August 2013, Huhne was appointed European Chairman of Zilkha Biomass Energy. The firm makes wood chip pellets in the United States. Huhne was also a consultant for Nationwide Energy Services, an energy saving company. Until 2014 Huhne was a weekly columnist for The Guardian. He has also provided consultancy services for start-ups in his particular specialism of despatchable renewables (like biogas and biomass). From 2014 to 2018, Huhne was the senior adviser for the trade body that represents renewable natural gas (biogas) plants in the UK, the Anaerobic Digestion & Bioresources Association (ADBA). He became chair of ADBA in June 2022, and is also senior adviser to the World Biogas Association.

== Depictions ==
In February 2010, Huhne was played by Alan Parnaby in the television film On Expenses and in 2015 by Rob Vowles in television film Coalition.

== Personal life ==
Huhne married Greek-born economist Vicky Pryce (formerly Chief Economist in the Department for Business, Enterprise and Regulatory Reform) in 1984 shortly after she divorced her first husband, with whom she had two daughters. Huhne and Pryce have three children together. In a video statement made during the 2007 Liberal Democrats' leadership election campaign, Huhne described his philosophy about family life: "Relationships, including particularly family relationships, are actually the most important things in making people happy and fulfilled". Talking about his wife to The Independent in 2008 he stated: "I also have a very hard-working and extremely intelligent wife, who manages to earn far more than I do."

In June 2010, Huhne admitted that he had been involved in a relationship with Carina Trimingham and stated that he had decided to leave his wife to be with her. Huhne's wife and children were unaware of his behaviour and plans. Within one week of Huhne's declaration, Pryce filed for divorce on the grounds of Huhne's "admitted adultery". Trimingham had worked on Huhne's campaigns for the Liberal Democrat leadership in 2006 and 2007 and was a paid staff member on his 2010 general-election campaign. She was press officer for Brian Paddick during the 2008 Mayor of London election, and was campaigns director at the Electoral Reform Society. Cabinet Office minister Francis Maude said: "What goes on in people's private lives is a subject that fascinates the tabloid press but is irrelevant to the job they are trying to do." Huhne and Pryce divorced in January 2011.

=== Personal interests ===
Apart from climate change, "Electoral reform" is among the personal interests that Huhne cites on his biography on the official Liberal Democrats website. He describes his other interests as "European single currency, economics, Third World debt and development, Europe".

Huhne is or was a member of the European Movement, Green Lib Dems, Association of Liberal Democrat Trade Unionists and the National Union of Journalists.

=== Publications and writing interests ===
Prior to his careers as a financial journalist, analyst and politician, Huhne wrote four books that are mainly on the themes of either Third-World debt and development, or European integration. His latest book is entitled Both Sides of the Coin (1999, with James Forder), in which he argues the case for British membership in the euro. His first was Debt and Danger (Penguin Special, 1985), an analysis of the 1984 Third World debt crisis co-written with Lord Lever of Manchester, the former Labour cabinet minister.

He was a contributor to The Orange Book (2004), in which he advocates reforms to the United Nations and international governance. Huhne was critical of the most controversial article in the Orange Book, in which David Laws proposed an insurance-based National Health Service. He did not take part in the successor volume, Britain after Blair and has voiced dismay at the way its predecessor was presented as a break with the party's social liberal traditions. More recently, he contributed to the book The City in Europe and the World (2005) and two articles to Reinventing the State (2007) edited by Duncan Brack, Richard Grayson and David Howarth. These cover the case for localism in which Huhne argues that there is no contradiction between localism and equality, and the need for environmental policy to tackle climate change.

Huhne has also written articles for Financial Times, The Guardian, The Independent and New Statesman. While an MEP, he wrote a weekly column for the London Evening Standard on European matters.

== Criminal conviction ==
In May 2011 Huhne's estranged wife Vicky Pryce approached a reporter for The Mail on Sunday with a claim that Huhne had "pressurised people to take his driving licence penalty points" on his behalf in 2003. Huhne denied the allegations of perverting the course of justice. Essex Police said: "We take allegations such as this one extremely seriously and will take action where necessary."

Essex Police sent initial papers to the Crown Prosecution Service regarding the allegations and Huhne exercised his right to remain silent in response to police questions in May. On 25 June 2011, Essex Police said that a judge at the Crown Court at Chelmsford had granted them a court order to take possession of a recording from The Sunday Times in which the ex-couple apparently discussed the case. It then emerged that Huhne had again been interviewed by police concerning the allegations, and on 28 July the police handed the file to prosecutors. On 17 August 2011, the Crown Prosecution Service remitted the matter to Essex Police with a direction to investigate the matter further. On 25 August 2011, Essex Police re-submitted the case to the CPS. A decision on whether criminal proceedings would be instituted for the alleged offence was expected to be made by the end of September 2011.

On 28 October 2011, the Crown Prosecution Service again referred the matter to Essex Police for further investigation, having completed a "full review" of the allegations. At a private hearing in October 2011, a judge in the Crown Court at Chelmsford ordered The Sunday Times to produce email messages between Pryce and the newspaper's political editor in relation to the police investigation. On 22 November, the Director of Public Prosecutions, Keir Starmer announced that the CPS was "very close" to deciding whether to prosecute. The reason for the delay was that The Sunday Times was seeking judicial review of the court order the CPS had obtained. Starmer stated "we do not shy away from prosecuting politicians". The judicial review hearing was scheduled for 20 January 2012. On that date The Sunday Times dropped its application for judicial review and said that it would comply with the court order for delivery of the documents.

The emails were delivered to Essex Police, who said there was no need to conduct further interviews.

Starmer created some controversy about the prospect of a fair trial by personally announcing on television on 3 February 2012 that both Huhne and Pryce had been charged with perverting the course of justice. Huhne thereupon resigned from the Cabinet. As a result of his resignation, and in accordance with the rules governing severance payments to resigning ministers, Huhne received a tax-free payment of £17,000. Huhne and Pryce appeared before Mr Justice Saunders in the Crown Court at Southwark on 2 March 2012. A trial was timetabled for early October 2012, with the possibility that the case might start earlier. Neither defendant entered a plea and both were granted unconditional bail. At a plea and case management hearing on 1 June 2012, Huhne announced his intention to apply to the court to have the charge dismissed. Pryce entered a plea of not guilty, and indicated a defence at trial of marital coercion: that is, that her then husband coerced her into taking his penalty points and that she committed the crime in his presence. On 5 October 2012, the trial was adjourned until 14 January 2013 for "legal reasons" which were not disclosed. On 28 January 2013, Huhne was arraigned and pleaded "not guilty" to the indictment. A new trial date was set for 4 February 2013.

On 4 February 2013, Huhne pleaded guilty on re-arraignment, and was appointed to the Chiltern Hundreds, the formal means of resigning his seat in Parliament. This triggered a by-election. He was remanded on unconditional bail until sentencing at a date to be notified.

In February 2013, at the trial of Vicky Pryce it was revealed that Constance Briscoe had been arrested in relation to statements she had made to police that she had not had any involvement with the leaking of the driving licence points-swapping story. Briscoe was arrested on 6 October 2012. She was later convicted, sentenced to 16 months in prison and disbarred. Prosecutor Andrew Edis told the jury that Briscoe and Pryce had "started it together by approaching a man called Andrew Alderson (a journalist working for the Mail on Sunday)", falsely claiming that one of Huhne's aides, Jo White, took points for him in 2003. Edis stated that Briscoe was a neighbour and friend of Pryce and that the "two of them appear to have cooked up a plan" to bring about Huhne's downfall.

On 11 March 2013, Huhne and Pryce were each sentenced to eight months' imprisonment. Huhne started serving his sentence in HM Prison Wandsworth but was reportedly transferred to HM Prison Leyhill in Gloucestershire. On the day after sentencing, David Burrowes MP wrote to the Attorney-General Dominic Grieve, asking him to exercise his power of referral to the Court of Appeal, as in Burrowes's view the sentences were too lenient. Grieve had until 8 April – 28 days after the original sentence – to decide whether to refer the case to the Court of Appeal, which has the power to increase sentences.

Huhne and his ex-wife were released on 13 May 2013, having both served two months of their eight-month sentences. Following their release, both were subject to electronic tagging. Huhne was required to stay in his home between 7 pm and 7 am. Huhne described prison as "a humbling and sobering experience".

== Writings ==
=== Books ===
- Harold Lever and Christopher Huhne, Debt and Danger: The World Financial Crisis (Penguin, London, 1986).
- Christopher Huhne, Real World Economics: Essays on Imperfect Markets And Fallible Governments (Penguin, London, 1991).
- Michael Emerson and Christopher Huhne (with a foreword by Jacques Delors), The ECU Report: The Single European Currency, and What it Means for You (Pan Books, London, 1991).
- James Forder and Christopher Huhne, Both Sides of the Coin: The Arguments For and Against the Euro and European Monetary Union (Profile Books, London, 1998).

=== Book chapters ===
- "Brussels and the European Economy" in Graham Watson and Joanna Hazelwood (eds), To the Power of Ten: Essays by the UK Liberal Democrats in Parliament (Centre for Reform, London, 2000).
- "Progressive Economics: Trust the People" in Neal Lawson and Neil Sherlock (eds), The Progressive Century: The Future of the Centre-Left in Britain (Palgrave Macmillan, Basingstoke, 2001).
- "Global Governance, Legitimacy and Renewal" in Paul Marshall and David Laws (eds), The Orange Book (Profile Books, London, 2004).
- "Globalisation" in Stephen Barber (ed.), The City in Europe and the World (European Research Forum at London Metropolitan University, London, 2006).
- "The Economy and Climate Change" in Duncan Brack, Richard Grayson and David Howarth (eds), Reinventing the State: Social Liberalism for the 21st Century (Politico's, London, 2007).
- "The Case for Localism: The Liberal Narrative" in Duncan Brack, Richard Grayson and David Howarth (eds), Reinventing the State: Social Liberalism for the 21st Century (Politico's, London, 2007).
- "Green Growth" in Duncan Brack, Paul Burall, Neil Stockley and Mike Tuffrey (eds), The Green Book: New Directions for Liberals in Government (Politico's, London, 2013).
- "Going Green Has to Be Fair" in Duncan Brack, Paul Burall, Neil Stockley and Mike Tuffrey (eds), The Green Book: New Directions for Liberals in Government (Politico's, London, 2013).

=== Pamphlets ===
- Paddy Ashdown, Alan Beith, Frances Cairncross, Mark Goyder, Dieter Helm, Christopher Huhne, Robert Hutchison, David Marquand, Nancy Seear, Christopher Smallwood and Hilary Wainwright, People, Prosperity and Politics: A LINk Conference (LINk Publications, Hebden Bridge, 1989).
- Richard Layard, Willem Buiter, David Currie, Christopher Huhne, Will Hutton, Peter Kenen, Robert Mundell and Adair Turner, The Case For The Euro (Britain in Europe, London, 2000).
- Richard Layard, Willem Buiter, Christopher Huhne, Will Hutton, Peter B. Kenen and Adair Turner, Why Britain Should Join the Euro (Britain in Europe, London, 2002).
- Charles Kennedy, Edward Davey, Chris Huhne, Charles Secrett and Adair Turner, with a foreword by Ralf Dahrendorf, "Funding Society: Can Taxation Be Fun and Popular?" — Report of the Liberal Summer School, Guildford, 2001 (Centre for Reform, London, May 2002).
- Tony Robinson, Theresa May, Chris Huhne and Matt Carter, The Future of Political Parties: Tony Robinson, Theresa May, Chris Huhne, Matt Carter in Conversation (New Politics Network, London, 2007).
- Chris Huhne, Climate Change: The Science, the Geopolitics and the Economics (CentreForum, London, 2011).

== See also ==
- Jonathan Aitken – Conservative politician imprisoned for perjury
- Jeffrey Archer – Conservative politician also imprisoned for perjury
- Marcus Einfeld - Australian judge also convicted of perverting the course of justice over a speeding case

European Parliament
New constituency	Member of the European Parliament for South East England; 1999–2005	Succeeded by Sharon Bowles
Parliament of the United Kingdom
Preceded by David Chidgey	Member of Parliament for Eastleigh; 2005–2013	Succeeded by Mike Thornton
Political offices
Preceded by Ed Miliband	Secretary of State for Energy and Climate Change; 2010–2012	Succeeded by Ed Davey
