= CPSU (disambiguation) =

CPSU is the Communist Party of the Soviet Union, the sole governing party of the Soviet Union until 1990.

CPSU may also refer to:

== Schools ==
- California Polytechnic State University, San Luis Obispo, California, USA
- Central Philippines State University, Negros Occidental, Philippines
- Coventry Polytechnic Students Union, England

== Organizations ==
- Central Public Sector Undertaking, a state-owned enterprise in India
- Civil and Public Services Union, an Irish trade union
- Commonwealth Policy Studies Unit, a think tank in London
- Communist Party of Social Justice, political party in Russia established in 2012
- Communist Party of the Soviet Union (2001)
- Community and Public Sector Union, an Australian trade union
- Union of Communist Parties – Communist Party of the Soviet Union
