= Mike Thornton (politician) =

British politician (born 1952)

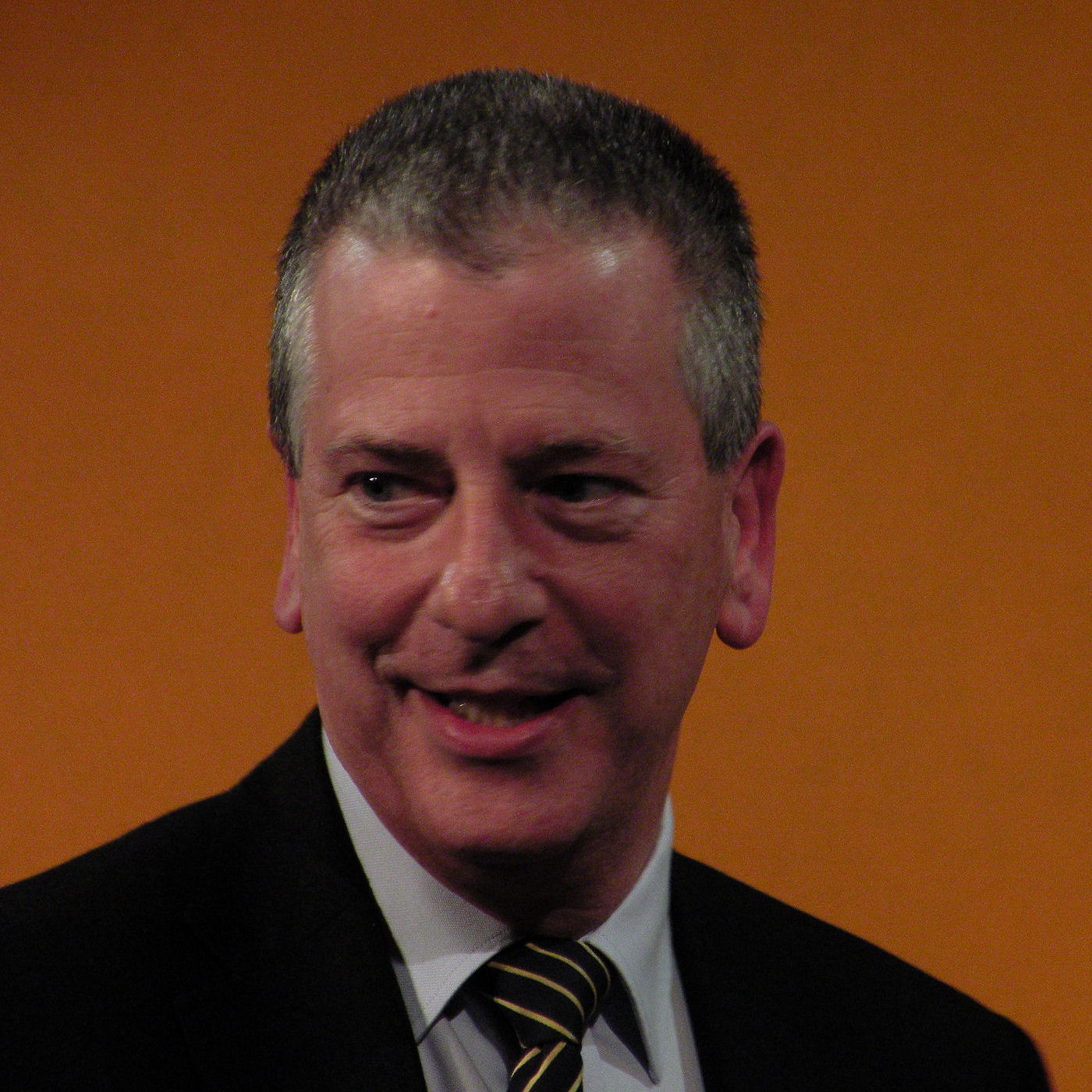
- Thornton in 2013

Member of Parliament for Eastleigh
- In office 28 February 2013 – 30 March 2015
- Preceded by: Chris Huhne
- Succeeded by: Mims Davies

Personal details
- Born: Michael Douglas Thornton; 1 May 1952 (age 74) Farnham, Surrey, England
- Party: Liberal Democrats
- Spouse: Peta Thornton
- Children: One daughter
- Education: Charterhouse School; Manchester Metropolitan University

Michael Douglas Thornton (born 1 May 1952) is a British politician and former Liberal Democrat Member of Parliament for Eastleigh in Hampshire. He was elected at the Eastleigh by-election held on 28 February 2013, a seat which he lost at the 2015 general election.

== Early life ==
The son of Sir Peter Eustace Thornton, Thornton grew up in Farnham in Surrey and was educated at Charterhouse School, before reading law at Manchester Polytechnic. He has had a range of jobs, including spells in the United States (his mother is from Tennessee). Thornton spent a significant period of time working in financial services.

He has lived in Bishopstoke, a part of Eastleigh borough, since 1994. He has variously been a Bishopstoke parish councillor, an Eastleigh borough councillor and a Hampshire county councillor, for wards within or containing Bishopstoke.

== Parliamentary career ==
Following the resignation of the previous Liberal Democrat MP Chris Huhne, Thornton was chosen as their candidate at the 2013 Eastleigh by-election to replace him. This took place on 28 February 2013 and Thornton was declared the winner in the early hours of 1 March.

In Parliament, Thornton joined the European Scrutiny Committee, the Work and Pensions Committee and the Bill committee for HS2, which he argued "would benefit the country as a whole, not just the cities that link to it".

His defeat at the 2015 general election was unexpected. Although he only defended a small numerical majority of 1,771, the Eastleigh constituency was otherwise a stronghold, with the Liberal Democrats holding almost every seat on the council for many years. During the 2013 by-election it had been reported that whilst the local Liberal Democrats commanded a vast database of supporters on the ground that enabled them to get their vote out, the local Tory organisation in the constituency was practically non-existent. Indeed, at the 2013 by-election, the Conservatives had been beaten into third place by UKIP.

Parliament of the United Kingdom
Preceded by Chris Huhne	Member of Parliament for Eastleigh; 2013–2015	Succeeded by Mims Davies
