= James Forder =

British academic / economist (born 1964)

James Forder (born 1964) is a British academic / economist and Tutorial Fellow in Economics at Balliol College, University of Oxford. He is editor of Oxford Economic Papers. He co-authored the book "Both Sides of the Coin" along with Chris Huhne in 1998, arguing the case against Britain's membership of the euro.

A staunch academic opponent of the euro, Forder has argued that its inception was political and not economic, and that its introduction will ultimately destabilise the institutions of the European Union; thus it should be opposed by liberal pro-Europeans. He is firmly opposed to Central Bank independence and has written a string of academic articles on this topic. He has also written "The case against voting reform", attacking the principle of proportional representation and opposing the alternative vote for British Parliamentary elections.

Forder is a keen bridge player and a senior member of the Balliol College Bridge Club.

He is a patron of Humanists UK.
