= Hiltingbury =

Neighbourhood of Eastleigh, Hampshire, England

Coordinates: 50.99833°N 1.38544°W

- Location within Hampshire
- OS grid reference: SU432222
- District: Eastleigh
- Shire county: Hampshire
- Region: South East
- Country: England
- Sovereign state: United Kingdom
- Post town: EASTLEIGH
- Postcode district: SO53
- Dialling code: 023
- Police: Hampshire and Isle of Wight
- Fire: Hampshire and Isle of Wight
- Ambulance: South Central
- UK Parliament: Eastleigh

Hiltingbury is an area within the Borough of Eastleigh in Hampshire, England. There is one electoral ward representing Hiltingbury, returning a total of three councillors to the Borough Council.

== Education ==
Hiltingbury Junior and Infant Schools share the same campus. The junior school opened in 1967, initially with six classes serving 201 children; today there are twelve classes, with 396 children. The infant school has nine classrooms, and takes on a maximum of 90 Year R children each year in three reception classes.
