= European Research Forum =

UK research unit

The European Research Forum at London Metropolitan University is an academic research unit which promotes analysis and debate of the politics and economics of the European Union, its member countries, Britain's relationship to them and its place in the world.

Launched in May 1998, it began by focusing on the political economy of the euro both as it affected the United Kingdom and the Eurozone. The forum examined the euro's institutional framework, the democratic debate and the relations between national governments and the management of the single currency. It also dealt with geographical aspects of euroland as they influence the wider European Union and the crucially important issues of international trade, security and defence impacts upon the European Union.

Other areas of study include European security and defence, political economy, and social democracy.

Located within the City of London, the Forum operates a geo-strategic politics programme for the financial services industry on its doorstep.

The Forum launched its own academic publisher in 2004 and became the European programme of the Global Policy Institute in 2007.

== Publications ==
- Reshaping Social Democracy (2004), Stephen Haseler and Henning Meyer (ed)
- The Gaitskellites (2005), Stephen Haseler
- The City in Europe and the World (2005), Stephen Barber (ed)
