= The Geo-Politics of the City =

2007 collection of essays

- Editor: Stephen Barber
- Language: English
- Publication date: 2007
- ISBN: 978-0-9554975-2-0

The Geo-Politics of the City (ISBN 978-0-9554975-2-0) is a 2007 collection of essays exploring the City of London's financial markets and globalisation, edited by Stephen Barber and with a foreword by Peter Jay.

The book covers topics such as the geo-political economy of the city, the post-industrial world economy, the end of geography, London as a global city, terrorism, supra-national bonds, foreign exchange, corporate responsibility, the growth of India and China, and challenges to the city.

It includes contributions from Guler Aras, Alex Brassey, David Crowther, David Lascelles, Kathy Pain, Lauren Phillips, Andreas Prindl, Swati Raju, Sam Whimster and Richard Woodward.
