= David Chidgey, Baron Chidgey =

British politician (1942–2022)

The Right Honourable The Lord Chidgey
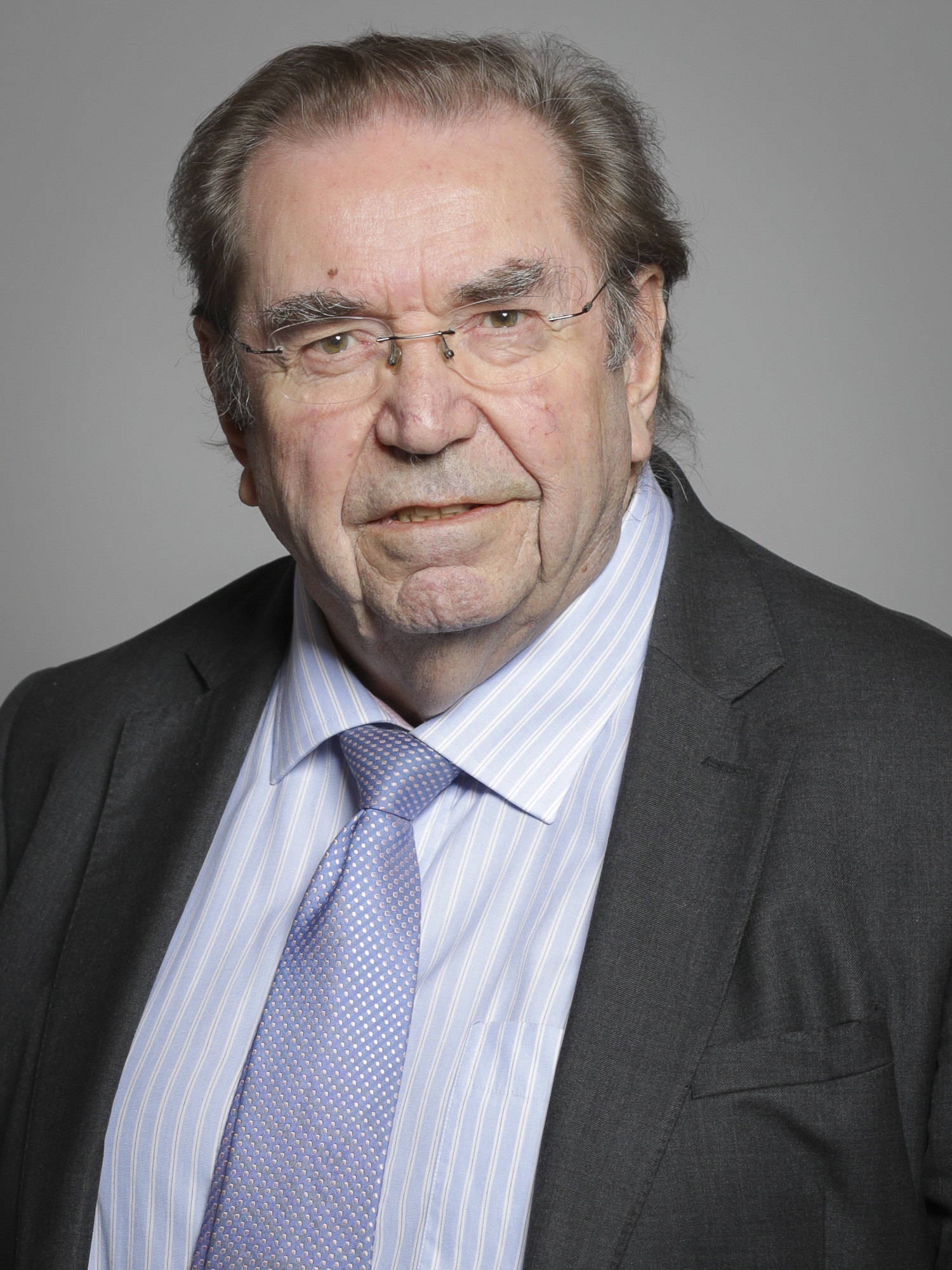
- Official portrait, 2019

Member of the House of Lords
- Lord Temporal
- Life peerage 17 June 2005 – 15 February 2022

Member of Parliament for Eastleigh
- In office 9 June 1994 – 11 April 2005
- Preceded by: Stephen Milligan
- Succeeded by: Chris Huhne

Personal details
- Born: 9 July 1942 Basingstoke, England
- Died: 15 February 2022 (aged 79)
- Party: Liberal Democrat
- Spouse: April Carolyn Idris-Jones (m. 1965)
- Education: University of Portsmouth
- Occupation: Politician

David William George Chidgey, Baron Chidgey (9 July 1942 – 15 February 2022) was a British Liberal Democrat politician who served as Member of Parliament (MP) for Eastleigh from 1994 to 2005, and latterly sat in the House of Lords from 2005 until his death.

== Early life ==
Chidgey was born on 9 July 1942. He attended Brune Park County High School (now called Brune Park Community College) in Gosport. A chartered engineer, Chidgey was educated as a mechanical engineer at the Admiralty College, Portsmouth (Portsmouth Naval College) and then as a civil engineer at the Portsmouth Polytechnic. He worked for Hampshire County Council until 1973, and then as a consulting engineer with Brian Colquhoun and Partners until 1994.

== Political career ==
Chidgey was a councillor from the mid-1970s to the early 1990s on New Alresford Town council and Winchester City Council. He contested the Hampshire Central European Parliament constituency at by-election in 1988 and at the 1989 European Parliament election. He was Regional Chairman of the Hampshire and Wight Liberal Democrats from 1992 to 1994.

At the 1992 general election, he contested the Eastleigh constituency in Hampshire, finishing second behind the Conservative candidate, Stephen Milligan. Following Milligan's death in 1994, Chidgey won the resulting by-election, squeezing the Conservatives into third place. He was re-elected in the 1997 and 2001 general elections and stood down at the 2005 general election.

In the House of Commons, he was a member of the Chairman's panel (2001–2005), an Employment & Training spokesman, Transport spokesman, Trade & Industry spokesman and a member of the Foreign Affairs Select Committee (1999–2005) and of the Joint Committee on Human Rights (2003–2005).

On 13 May 2005 it was announced that Chidgey would be created a life peer, and on 17 June 2005 the peerage was created as Baron Chidgey, of Hamble-le-Rice in the County of Hampshire. In the House of Lords, he was Liberal Democrat spokesman in defence from 2005 to 2006. He was Given the Freedom of the Borough of Eastleigh in 2005.

In 2007, Chidgey was named a member of the AWEPA Governing Council.

In 2008 Chidgey was named the Chairman of the oversight committee for the Commonwealth Policy Studies Unit, a think tank devoted to policy concerns throughout the Commonwealth.

== Personal life and death ==
Chidgey married April Carolyn Idris-Jones in 1965 in Gosport. They had a son and two daughters. He died on 15 February 2022, at the age of 79, from COVID-19.

== Arms ==
Coat of arms of David Chidgey, Baron Chidgey

Crest
Issuant from a coronet of fleurs-de-lys Or an eagle's head Argent gorged with a wreath of oak leaves Proper.
Escutcheon
Gules on a bend counter-embattled Argent three patriarchal crosses their limbs transposed Gules.
Motto
Croyance Courage Assiduité

Parliament of the United Kingdom
Preceded by Stephen Milligan	Member of Parliament for Eastleigh; 1994–2005	Succeeded by Chris Huhne
