= Sharon Bowles =

British politician (born 1953)

The Right Honourable The Baroness Bowles of Berkhamsted
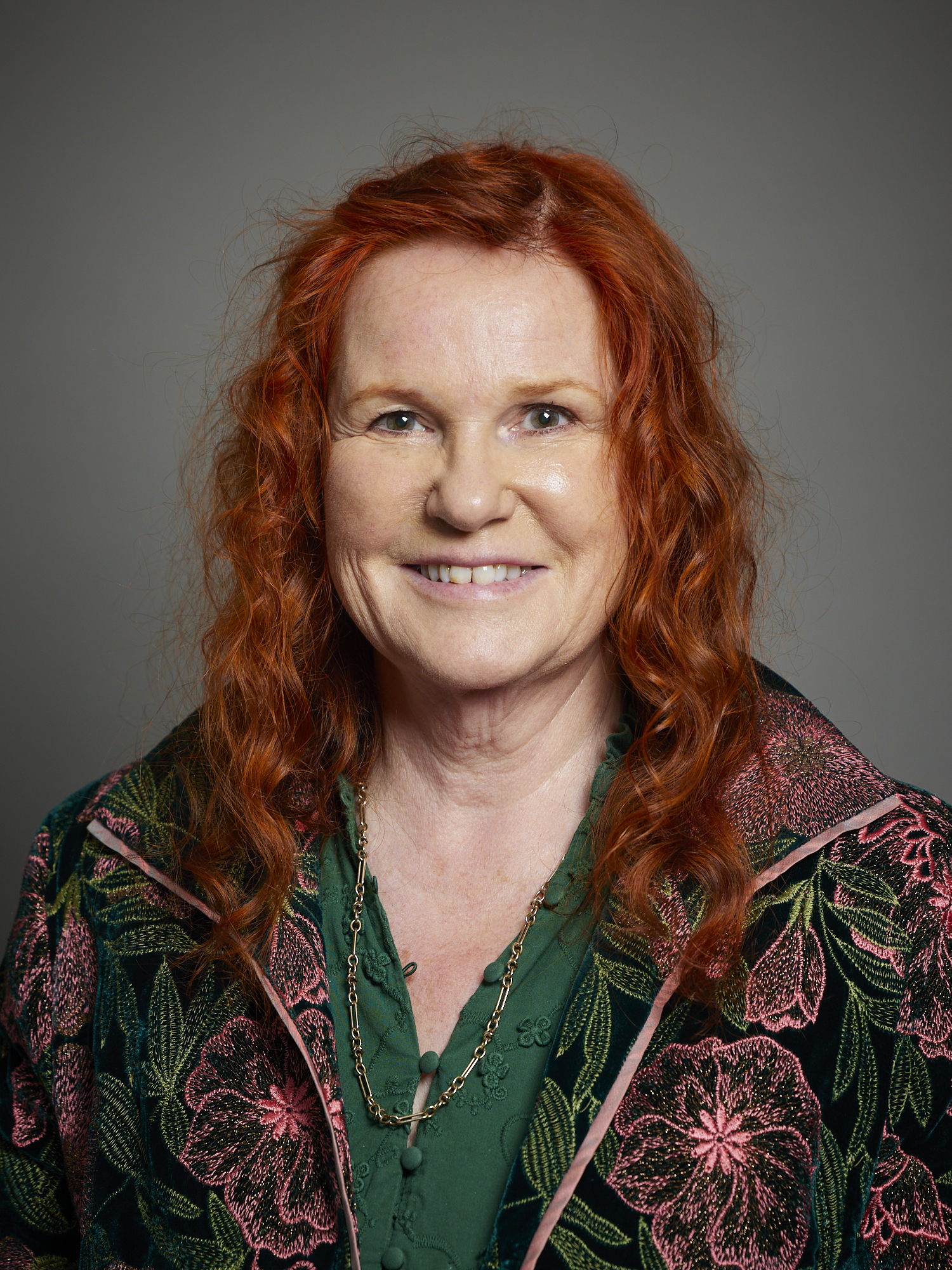
- Official portrait, 2024

Member of the House of Lords
- Lord Temporal
- Life peerage 23 October 2015

Member of the European Parliament for South East England
- In office 12 May 2005 – 2 July 2014
- Preceded by: Chris Huhne
- Succeeded by: Janice Atkinson

Personal details
- Born: 12 June 1953 (age 73) Oxford, England
- Party: Liberal Democrat
- Education: Reading University
- Website: sharonbowles.org.uk

Sharon Margaret Bowles, Baroness Bowles of Berkhamsted (born 12 June 1953), is a Liberal Democrat politician. She was a Member of the European Parliament (MEP) for the South East England region of the United Kingdom from 2005 to 2014. She sat in the Alliance of Liberals and Democrats for Europe grouping. She was educated at the independent Our Lady's Abingdon, the University of Reading and Lady Margaret Hall, Oxford.

Bowles has been described as the most influential Briton in the development of European Union policy, and also as one of the top ten most influential regulators in the European Union, and most influential woman. She was short listed to be Governor of the Bank of England in 2012.

On 15 August 2014 she became a non executive director of The London Stock Exchange Group plc and of its subsidiary The London Stock Exchange plc.

She was nominated for a life peerage in the 2015 Dissolution Honours and was created Baroness Bowles of Berkhamsted, of Bourne End in the County of Hertfordshire, on 23 October 2015.

== Political career ==
Before joining the European Parliament, Bowles worked as a European patent attorney. She was a member of the Chartered Institute of Patent Attorneys (CIPA). She was the European Parliament's only registered patent attorney.

In the 1992 and 1997 general elections she was the Liberal Democrat candidate for the Aylesbury constituency. She was a member of the bureau of the European Liberal Democrat and Reform Party from 2004. That party took on the name Alliance of Liberals and Democrats for Europe (ALDE) in 2012. Bowles eventually departed the ALDE on leaving the European Parliament.

She replaced Chris Huhne in the European Parliament after he was elected to the House of Commons in the 2005 general election. On 10 November 2007 she was selected as the first placed prospective candidate on the Liberal Democrat list for the 2009 election in the South-East England European constituency, and was re-elected to the European Parliament on 4 June 2009. She served alongside Catherine Bearder as MEP for South East England.

== European Parliament ==
=== First term ===
Coming to the European Parliament a year into its 6th sitting, Bowles sat on the Committee on Economic and Monetary Affairs (ECON), and became a substitute member of the Committee on Legal Affairs. She was also a member of the European Parliament's delegation for relations with the countries of South East Asia and ASEAN. In 2008 she was nominated to serve as the European Parliament's representative on the European Statistical Advisory Committee.

=== Second term ===
Bowles was re-elected in the 2009 European Parliament election, and took up her seat on 14 July. Shortly thereafter Bowles was elected chairwoman of the Committee on Economic and Monetary Affairs, succeeding Pervenche Berès.

Bowles was re-elected chairwoman of the Economic and Monetary Affairs Committee in January 2012 and served in this role until the end of the parliamentary term in 2014. In early 2012 she announced her intention not to restand for election.

== See also ==
- Members of the European Parliament for the United Kingdom 2004-2009
