= David Price (British politician) =

British politician

Sir David Price KCB DL

Member of Parliament for Eastleigh
- In office 26 May 1955 – 16 March 1992
- Preceded by: Seat created
- Succeeded by: Stephen Milligan

Personal details
- Born: David Ernest Campbell Price; 20 November 1924
- Died: 31 January 2014 (aged 89)
- Party: Conservative
- Spouse: Rosemary Johnston (m. 1960; died 2006)
- Children: 1 daughter
- Education: Eton College; Trinity College, Cambridge; Yale University

Military service
- Allegiance: United Kingdom
- Branch/service: 1st Battalion Scots Guards
- Rank: Major
- Battles/wars: World War 2

Sir David Ernest Campbell Price DL (20 November 1924 – 31 January 2014) was a Conservative Party politician in the United Kingdom.

== Early life ==
Price was educated at Eton College, Trinity College, Cambridge, and Yale University. He was President of the Cambridge Union in 1948. He served with the Scots Guards during World War II, a staff officer in Trieste. He became an economist and industrial executive.

== Political career ==
Price was the first Member of Parliament (MP) for Eastleigh, from the seat's creation in 1955 until his retirement in 1992, when he was succeeded by Stephen Milligan.

Price was British representative on the Consultative Assembly of the Council of Europe (1958–61) and became a junior minister at the Board of Trade in 1962 where he was responsible for the Weights and Measures Act 1963. In 1964, he became opposition spokesman on education and science. From 1971 to 1972, Price served as a junior minister for Aerospace. He was removed from his position over issues relating to Rolls Royce facing imminent collapse related to the RB211 Aero Engine.

On December 1, 1971 25 year old Virginia Evans, his secretary, became the first female to fly in Concorde 002; she flew at Mach 2. Jacqueline Cochran, of US, was the first woman to fly at Mach 1 on May 18, 1953.

== Honours ==
He was given the Freedom of the Borough of Eastleigh in 1977. He was knighted in the 1980 Birthday Honours and was appointed Deputy Lieutenant for Hampshire in 1982.

Parliament of the United Kingdom
Preceded by (new constituency)	Member of Parliament for Eastleigh; 1955–1992	Succeeded by Stephen Milligan
