= Commonwealth Policy Studies Unit =

English think tank

- Type: Think-tank
- Legal status: Defunct
- Parent organization: Institute of Commonwealth Studies, University of London

The Commonwealth Policy Studies Unit (CPSU) was a think-tank covering matters pertaining to the Commonwealth of Nations. It formed part of the University of London's Institute of Commonwealth Studies, itself part of the School of Advanced Study.

In 2011 the CPSU rebranded as the Commonwealth Advisory Bureau (CA/B). In April 2013 the activity of the Commonwealth Advisory Bureau was incorporated into the wider work of the Institute of Commonwealth Studies, and the separate identity of the CA/B ceased.

== Structure and governance ==
=== History ===
The Commonwealth Policy Studies Unit was regarded as 'a widely respected authority on the Commonwealth'. The CPSU received its go-ahead from the Institute of Commonwealth Studies (ICWS), at the end of 1998 after a feasibility study funded by the British and Canadian governments. The only think-tank in the world dedicated to Commonwealth affairs, the Unit worked on issues of globalisation, democracy, civil society, and human rights with persons and agencies around the Commonwealth. Through the years, the CPSU has become a respected and valued part of the Commonwealth family, working closely with Commonwealth governments, the Commonwealth Secretariat and the Commonwealth Foundation. In addition to a range of projects, the Unit produced a Commonwealth Ministerial Policy Brief ahead of every Commonwealth Ministerial Meeting, as well as for the Commonwealth Heads of Government Meetings.

=== Mission ===
The mission of CPSU was to act as a think-tank for the entire Commonwealth. The CPSU stimulated debate, enquiry, and the sharing of ideas and information across the Commonwealth. CPSU fulfilled its mission primarily through ongoing programmes for externally funded research projects, a series of events, and an extensive body of briefings and publications. CPSU projects aimed to change the way people thought, for instance, about youth engagement, legal reform, international aid architecture, food security and assisting developing and small island states to maximise the opportunities of globalisation. CPSU conducts a wide range of first class policy studies on issues of wide concern. In addition, CPSU raised the quality of policy-making by governments, intergovernmental organisations, business and civil society, and local communities.

=== Governance ===
The CPSU, starting small on the basis of project funding, kept its governance arrangements simple. As of June 2008 the unit had a staff of ten people, including two interns. CPSU has an international advisory board chaired by Lord Chidgey, which for specified purposes may be regarded as a subcommittee of the Advisory Council of the Institute of Commonwealth Studies.

== Former projects ==
CPSU conducted research to inform and influence policy makers in over a quarter of the world's countries. Previous projects include work on Gun Culture in Commonwealth urban areas, Commonwealth Membership, UN Reform, Corporate Social Responsibility, Fisheries, Youth Engagement, and Water-related Conflict and Security. With projects such as these, CPSU put the policy choices before the Commonwealth into sharper focus, exploring options and suggesting new directions.

The CPSU ran conferences, dialogues, workshops and seminars which are typically held at the Institute of Commonwealth Studies. Most events were by invitation only but many were open to the public. In addition, the Unit also ran events outside the United Kingdom in conjunction with other bodies.

=== Programmes ===
The CPSU worked across five programme area on pioneering work for the modern Commonwealth. Within each of these programmes there were a number of projects at various stages of development:

Water & Environment Programme

- Marine Fisheries Management and Coastal Zone Communities in the Commonwealth
- Forestry & Sustainable Development: comparative case studies in the Commonwealth
- Water Security in the Commonwealth: best practise and lesson learning

Communities & Civil Society Programme

- Gun culture in Commonwealth urban areas
- Interfaith dialogue in the Commonwealth
- Digital education in Commonwealth Universities
- Think tanks in South Asia

Youth & Education Programme

- Youth engagement and CSO
- Summer Conference 2008
- Commonwealth e-Pals

Economic Development programme

- Zimbabwe economic revival
- Policy making against corruption in SE Asia
- Odius Debt in Commonwealth countries
- IFI Reform: a Commonwealth approach
- CSR: a case study of Belize and Botswana

Governance Programme

- Governance Network Coordinator (for ACU)
- Commonwealth membership (Rwanda & Madagascar)
- The State of Democracy in the Commonwealth
- High Level Expert Group on Policing
- CMAG policy brief

== Funders and partners ==
The CPSU received funding from other associations and organisations around the Commonwealth. The CPSU's funders and partners include:

- Allan and Nesta Ferguson Charitable Trust
- Association of Commonwealth Universities
- Australian Government's AusAid
- Commonwealth Foundation
- Commonwealth Political Affairs Division (CPAD), Commonwealth Secretariat
- Commonwealth Scholarship Commission, Commonwealth Scholarship and Fellowship Plan
- Commonwealth Secretariat, Commonwealth Fund for Technical Cooperation
- Commonwealth-UN Co-operation for Development Department for International Development
- Department for Education and Skills, UK
- Department for Foreign Affairs and International Trade, Canada
- Department for International Development, UK
- Economic and Social Research Council
- Ford Foundation, New York; Commonwealth Parliamentary Association
- Foreign and Commonwealth Office through its Commonwealth Coordination Department
- Foreign and Commonwealth Office, Rwanda
- Foreign and Commonwealth Office, UK
- Governance and Institutional Development Division (GIDD), Commonwealth Secretariat
- Nexus Strategic Partnerships
- Routledge (Taylor & Francis)
- Trinidad and Tobago High Commission, London
- UK Constitution Department for Constitutional Affairs
- Universities and Development Association of Commonwealth Universities; British Council
- University of London Vice-Chancellor's Development Fund

== See also ==
- Commonwealth Foundation
- Commonwealth Secretariat
