= Stephen Milligan =

British politician and journalist (1948–1994)

- Milligan speaking in Parliament, 1992

Member of Parliament for Eastleigh
- In office 9 April 1992 – 7 February 1994
- Preceded by: David Price
- Succeeded by: David Chidgey

Personal details
- Born: Stephen David Wyatt Milligan; 12 May 1948 Godalming, England
- Died: 7 February 1994 (aged 45) Hammersmith, London, England
- Cause of death: Autoerotic asphyxiation
- Resting place: St Peter's Church; Woodmancote, England
- Party: Conservative (before 1981; after 1990)
- Other political affiliations: SDP (1981–1990)
- Domestic partner: Julie Kirkbride (1992–94)
- Education: Magdalen College, Oxford (BA)
- Profession: Politician; journalist

Stephen David Wyatt Milligan (12 May 1948 – 7 February 1994) was a British Conservative politician and journalist. He held a number of senior journalistic posts until his election to serve as Member of Parliament (MP) for Eastleigh in 1992. Milligan was Parliamentary private secretary to Jonathan Aitken, Minister of State for Defence, and was regarded as a "rising star" of the Conservative Party. He remained in office until he died at his home in Hammersmith, London, apparently self-strangled during an act of autoerotic asphyxiation.

== Early life ==
Milligan was born in Godalming, Surrey, on 12 May 1948, the son of David Milligan, a company secretary at House of Fraser, and Ruth Seymour, a ballet teacher. He was educated at Bradfield College, and Magdalen College, Oxford, where he studied Philosophy, politics and economics. At Oxford, he became president of both the Oxford Union and the Oxford University Conservative Association. He was a contemporary of journalist Libby Purves, whom he once partnered to a College Ball.

== Career ==
=== Journalism ===
Milligan joined The Economist in 1970, and was industrial editor and chief EEC correspondent from 1972 to 1980. In 1976, he published a book, The New Barons, on British trade unions in the 1970s. Still working for The Economist, he took a position as presenter of The World Tonight on BBC Radio 4 from 1980 until 1983. He later became foreign editor and Washington correspondent at The Sunday Times from 1984 until 1987, before rejoining the BBC in 1988 as a European correspondent. Sunday Times editor Andrew Neil described Milligan: "He possessed an enquiring, original intelligence, a wide knowledge of foreign and domestic affairs and he was great fun to work with, his infectious laugh filling our editorial meetings, where he played a major role in defining the paper's policy positions".

=== Politics ===
Milligan left the Conservative Party upon the formation of the Social Democratic Party in 1981. However, he rejoined the Conservatives and in 1990 was selected as the prospective parliamentary candidate for Eastleigh. He became secretary of the Conservative Foreign and Commonwealth Council in 1991 and was a member of the moderate Bow Group. At the 1992 general election, Milligan was elected as Member of Parliament for Eastleigh with a majority of 17,702. Seen as a 'rising star' in the party and noted for his Commons interventions on foreign policy, he was appointed Parliamentary private secretary to Jonathan Aitken, Minister of State for Defence. His last contribution in Parliament was in a debate on the Energy Conservation Bill on 4 February 1994.

== Death ==
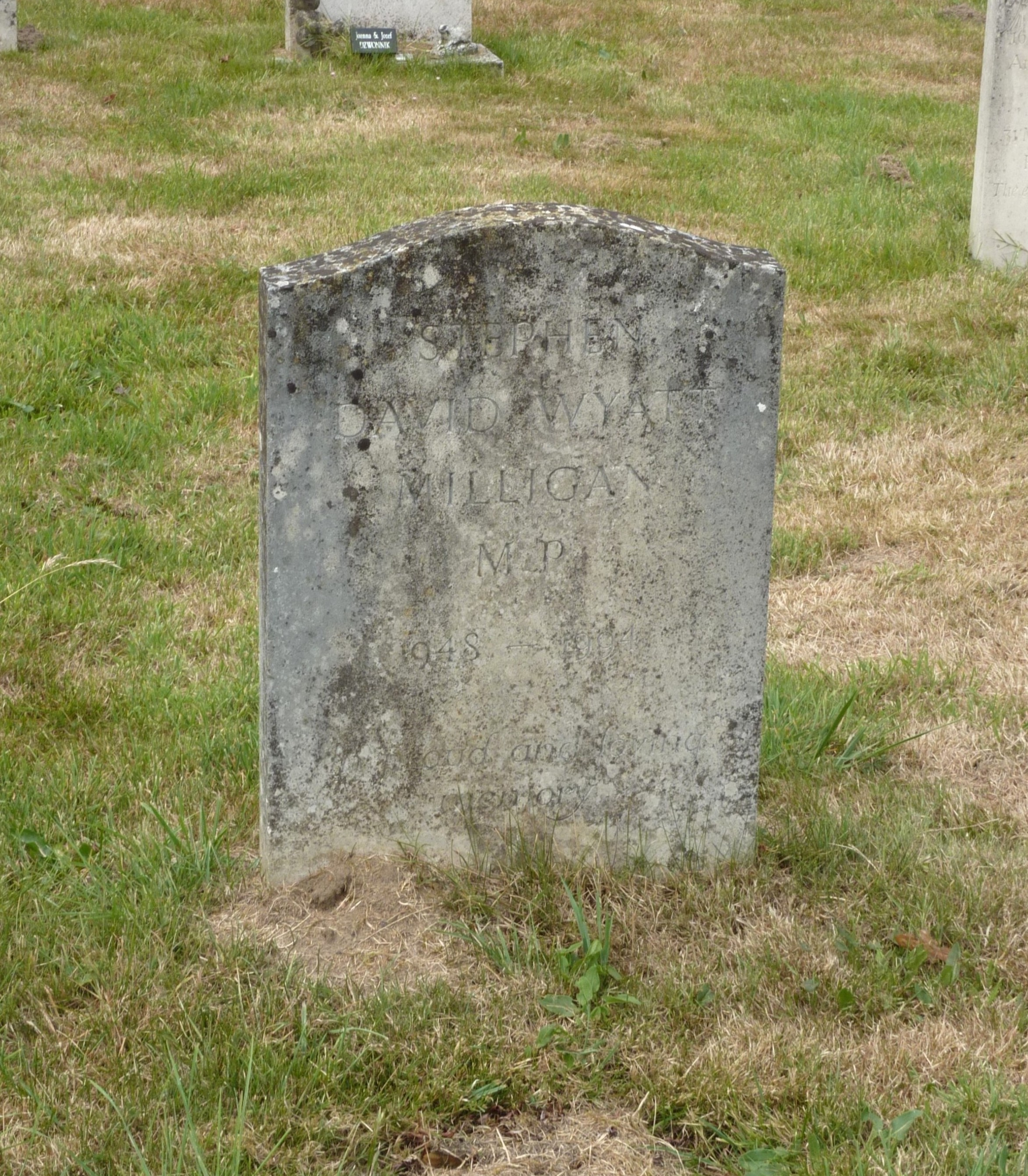
Milligan's grave in the churchyard of St. Peter in Woodmancote, West Sussex, in 2014

Milligan was found dead in his house at 64 Black Lion Lane, Hammersmith, London, by his secretary Vera Taggart on 7 February 1994. Milligan had failed to appear in the House of Commons as expected, and so Taggart went to look for him. Milligan's corpse was found naked except for a pair of stockings and suspenders, with an electrical flex tied around his neck, his head covered and an orange in his mouth. The coroner concluded that he had died in the early hours of the day he was discovered.

The pathology report into Milligan's death discounted the possibility of murder, lending weight to the belief that he died as a result of suicide or, more likely, died accidentally from autoerotic asphyxiation. No drugs or alcohol were found in his blood, and no substances were found to have contributed to his death. It was ruled a death by misadventure.

=== Aftermath ===
Milligan's death was one of the scandals which contributed to the collapse of John Major's "Back to Basics" policy initiative, which was seen as emphasising socially conservative values. In an interview after Milligan's death, likely under the presumption it was a suicide, Major said that Milligan "must have been pretty unhappy, pretty miserable". This characterisation was criticised by Milligan's cousin, Judge Tim Milligan, who wrote that "with respect to the Prime Minister, Stephen was neither miserable or unhappy. On the contrary, he was thoroughly fulfilled and happy in his work in Westminster and his Eastleigh constituency, which gave him the chance to be of service to others as he always wished."

Milligan left an estate worth £846,860 (equivalent to £1,786,861 in 2025), leaving £5,000 (equivalent to £10,550 in 2025) to Oxfam and £500 (equivalent to £1,055 in 2025) to St Peter's Church, Hammersmith. His death triggered a by-election for his Eastleigh seat, which was held on 9 June. The by-election was won by the Liberal Democrat candidate David Chidgey, who would hold the seat until the 2005 general election. The Conservative candidate, Stephen Allison, came third in the by-election.

Following Milligan's death, Hat Trick Productions, the producers of the BBC's satirical television programme Have I Got News for You, sent black bin bags, oranges and black stockings to journalists to publicise a new series of the show. The BBC subsequently apologised to Milligan's parents for the incident.

Parliament of the United Kingdom
Preceded by David Price	Member of Parliament for Eastleigh; 1992–1994	Succeeded by David Chidgey
