= Stephen Barber (political scientist) =

British political scientist

Stephen Barber (born 1974) is a British political scientist, political economist and author. He is Professor of Global Affairs at the University of East London , having previously held professorial chair at Regent's University London. He has been a senior fellow at the Global Policy Institute. He has also worked in the European Research Forum and is a former director of MBA. He is a specialist in British public policy and party politics, political economy and having worked in the City of London, the globalisation of financial markets. He holds a BA in government, an MA in contemporary history and a PhD in political science, awarded by several London universities. He is a Fellow of the Royal Historical Society and Member of the Securities & Investment Institute. Following the Northern Rock and banking credit crisis in 2008, he outlined his concept of a regulatory cycle of economic behaviour.

He wrote and presented the BBC Radio 4 programme The Case for Doing Nothing, which was broadcast in October 2016.

== Publications ==
- Political Strategy: modern politics in contemporary Britain (2005)
- The City in Europe and the World (2005) (editor)
- The Geo-Politics of the City (2007) (editor)
- Greed (2009) (editor with Alexis Brassey)
- Tragedy of Riches: how our politics has failed us and why we need a new economic destiny (2011)
- Westminster, Governance and the Politics of Policy Inaction: Do Nothing (2016)
