= Eastleigh (constituency) =

Parliamentary constituency in the United Kingdom, 1955 onwards

Coordinates: 50.95°N 1.33°W

- Borough constituency for the House of Commons
- Interactive map of boundaries from 2024
- Boundary of Eastleigh in South East England
- County: Hampshire
- Electorate: 69,982 (2023)
- Major settlements: Eastleigh; Bishopstoke; West End; Chandler's Ford

Current constituency
- Created: 1955
- Member of Parliament: Liz Jarvis (Liberal Democrats)
- Seats: One
- Created from: Winchester (fraction of)

Eastleigh is a constituency (Note: A borough constituency (for the purposes of election expenses and type of returning officer)) represented in the House of Commons of the UK Parliament since 2024 by Liz Jarvis, a Liberal Democrat.

== Constituency profile ==
The Eastleigh constituency is located in Hampshire and forms part of the South Hampshire conurbation. It covers the towns of Eastleigh and Chandler's Ford, the villages of Bishopstoke and Fair Oak and the Southampton suburb of West End. The constituency is generally wealthy with low levels of deprivation; Chandler's Ford falls within the top 10% least-deprived areas in England. House prices are similar to national averages.

Compared to the rest of the country, residents of the constituency have average levels of education and high rates of income and professional employment. White people made up 91% of the population at the 2021 census. At the local council level, most of the constituency is represented by Liberal Democrats, although some Conservatives were elected in Fair Oak. An estimated 51% of voters in the constituency supported leaving the European Union in the 2016 referendum, similar to the nationwide figure of 52%.

== Boundaries ==
Map of 2010–2024 boundaries

1955–1974: The Borough of Eastleigh, in the Rural District of New Forest the parishes of Eling and Netley Marsh, in the Rural District of Romsey and Stockbridge the parishes of Ampfield, Chilworth, North Baddesley, and Nursling and Rownhams, and in the Rural District of Winchester the parishes of Botley, Bursledon, Hamble, Hedge End, Hound, and West End.

1974–1983: The Boroughs of Eastleigh and Romsey, in the Rural District of Romsey and Stockbridge the parishes of Ampfield, Braishfield, Chilworth, Melchet Park and Plaitford, Michelmersh, North Baddesley, Nursling and Rownhams, Romsey Extra, Sherfield English, and Wellow, and in the Rural District of Winchester the parishes of Botley, Bursledon, Hamble, Hedge End, Hound, and West End.

1983–1997: The Borough of Eastleigh, and the City of Southampton ward of Woolston.

1997–2010: The Borough of Eastleigh wards of Bishopstoke, Botley, Bursledon, Eastleigh Central, Eastleigh North, Eastleigh South, Eastleigh West, Fair Oak, Hamble, Hedge End St John's, Hedge End Wildern, Hound, West End North, and West End South.

2010–2024: The Borough of Eastleigh wards of Bishopstoke East, Bishopstoke West, Botley, Bursledon and Old Netley, Eastleigh Central, Eastleigh North, Eastleigh South, Fair Oak and Horton Heath, Hamble-le-Rice and Butlocks Heath, Hedge End Grange Park, Hedge End St John's, Hedge End Wildern, Netley Abbey, West End North, and West End South.

2024–present: Further to the 2023 review of Westminster constituencies which became effective for the 2024 general election, the constituency is composed of the following (as they existed on 1 December 2020):

- The Borough of Eastleigh wards of Bishopstoke, Chandler's Ford, Eastleigh Central, Eastleigh North, Eastleigh South, Fair Oak & Horton Heath, Hiltingbury, West End North, and West End South.
- The Borough of Test Valley ward of Valley Park.

The seat underwent major changes with southern areas, including the communities of Hedge End, Botley, Netley and Hamble-le-Rice (42% of the 2010–2024 electorate) forming about half the new constituency of Hamble Valley. To compensate, Chandler's Ford and Hiltingbury were transferred back in from Winchester, along with the neighbouring Test Valley ward of Valley Park, formerly part of Romsey and Southampton North.

== History ==
Eastleigh constituency was created for the 1955 general election; before then Eastleigh itself had been in the Winchester constituency. It was a fairly safe seat for the Conservatives for nearly forty years until the death of its then MP, former journalist Stephen Milligan, in 1994. At the subsequent by-election, the Liberal Democrats gained the seat on a very large swing, and then held Eastleigh in the four following general elections (1997, 2001, 2005 and 2010), though with somewhat narrow majorities.

Chris Huhne, the MP from 2005 to 2013, was his party's environment spokesman in opposition, before becoming the Liberal Democrat senior spokesman for the Home Office (or Second Shadow Home Secretary). While in the previous role Huhne stood unsuccessfully for party leader in 2006 against Menzies Campbell and again in 2007 against Nick Clegg. Following the 2010 general election, Huhne joined the coalition government's cabinet as Secretary of State for Energy and Climate Change, but resigned as an MP in February 2013 after admitting perverting the course of justice over a speeding case. His resignation took effect from 5 February, and the following day it was confirmed that a by-election to fill the vacancy would be held on 28 February 2013. Mike Thornton retained the seat for the Liberal Democrats in the by-election. However, at the 2015 general election Thornton was defeated by the Conservative Mims Davies.

Davies retained the seat for the Conservatives in 2017, but for the 2019 election she stood down from this seat, successfully standing for the Mid Sussex constituency instead. Her fellow Conservative, Paul Holmes was duly elected as her successor. Following the 2023 boundary changes, Holmes followed suit and stood down to fight the new seat of Hamble Valley, which contained a minority of the existing Eastleigh seat. At the 2024 election, Liz Jarvis regained the seat for the Liberal Democrats.

== Members of Parliament ==
Winchester prior to 1955

Election	Member	Party
1955	David Price	Conservative
1992	Stephen Milligan	Conservative
1994 by-election	David Chidgey	Liberal Democrat
2005	Chris Huhne	Liberal Democrat
2013 by-election	Mike Thornton	Liberal Democrat
2015	Mims Davies	Conservative
2019	Paul Holmes	Conservative
2024	Liz Jarvis	Liberal Democrat

== Elections ==
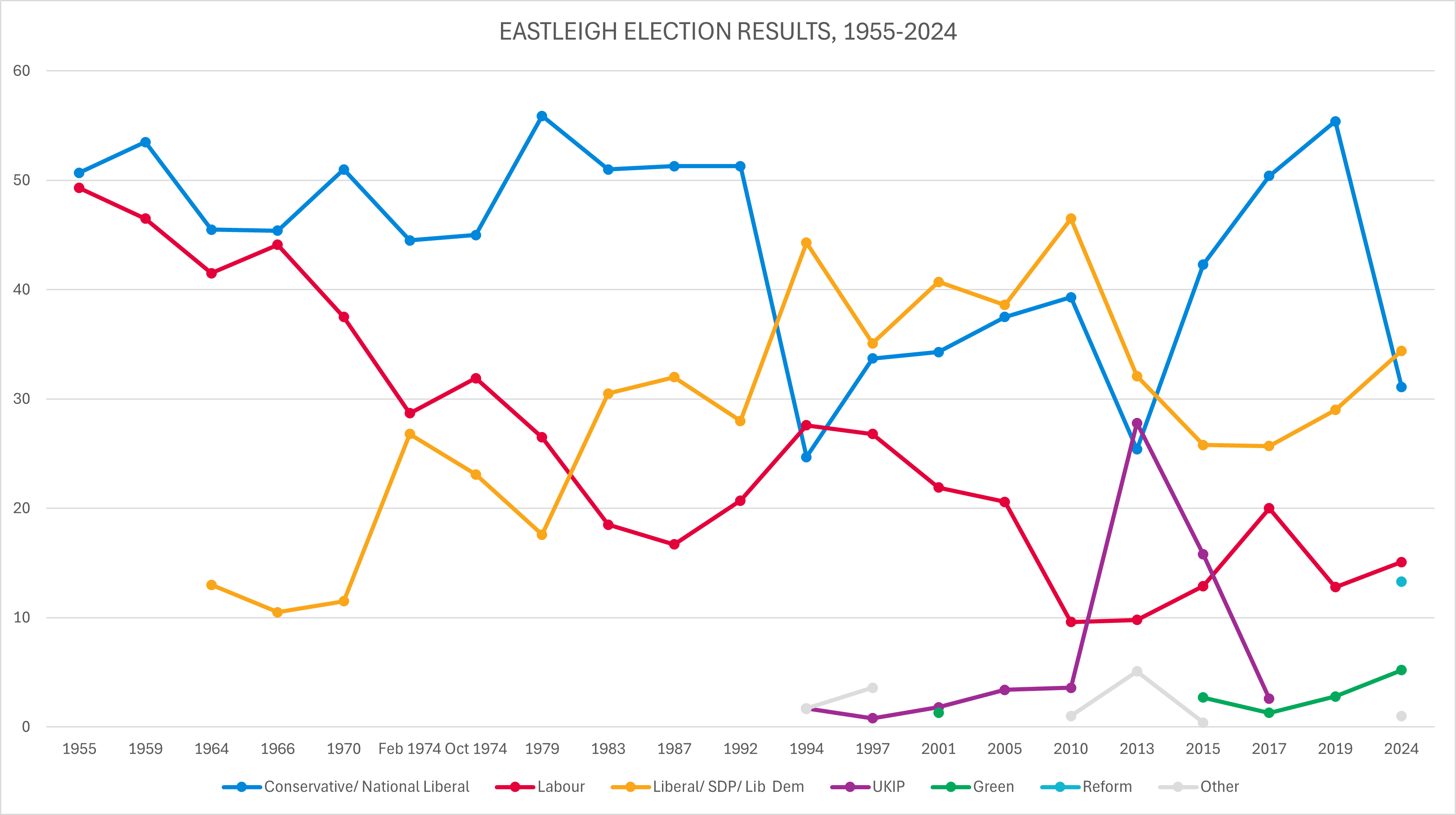
Election results 1955-2024

=== Elections in the 2020s ===
General election 2024: Eastleigh
Party	Candidate	Votes	%	±%
Liberal Democrats	Liz Jarvis	15,970	34.4	±0.0
Conservative	Samuel Joynson	14,424	31.1	−20.8
Labour	Daniel Shearer	7,005	15.1	+3.4
Reform	Clare Fawcett	6,151	13.3	New
Green	Ben Parry	2,403	5.2	+3.2
Independent	Russ Kitching	467	1.0	New
Majority		1,546	3.3	N/A
Turnout		46,420	66.3	−4.5
Registered electors		69,965		
Liberal Democrats gain from Conservative		Swing	+10.4	

=== Elections in the 2010s ===
2019 notional result
Party	Vote	%
Conservative	25,711	51.9
Liberal Democrats	17,070	34.4
Labour	5,778	11.7
Green	1,013	2.0
Turnout	49,572	70.8
Electorate	69,982	

General election 2019: Eastleigh
Party	Candidate	Votes	%	±%
Conservative	Paul Holmes	32,690	55.4	+5.0
Liberal Democrats	Lynda Murphy	17,083	29.0	+3.3
Labour	Sam Jordan	7,559	12.8	−7.2
Green	Ron Meldrum	1,639	2.8	+1.5
Majority		15,607	26.4	+1.7
Turnout		58,971	70.3	−0.2
Conservative hold		Swing	+0.9	

General election 2017: Eastleigh
Party	Candidate	Votes	%	±%
Conservative	Mims Davies	28,889	50.4	+8.1
Liberal Democrats	Mike Thornton	14,710	25.7	−0.1
Labour	Jill Payne	11,454	20.0	+7.1
UKIP	Malcolm Jones	1,477	2.6	−13.2
Green	Ron Meldrum	750	1.3	−1.4
Majority		14,179	24.7	+8.2
Turnout		57,280	70.5	+0.8
Conservative hold		Swing	+4.1	

General election 2015: Eastleigh
Party	Candidate	Votes	%	±%
Conservative	Mims Davies	23,464	42.3	+3.0
Liberal Democrats	Mike Thornton	14,317	25.8	−20.7
UKIP	Patricia Culligan	8,783	15.8	+12.2
Labour	Mark Latham	7,181	12.9	+3.3
Green	Ron Meldrum	1,513	2.7	New
Beer, Baccy and Scratchings	Ray Hall	133	0.2	N/A
TUSC	Declan Clune	114	0.2	New
Majority		9,147	16.5	N/A
Turnout		55,505	69.7	+0.4
Conservative gain from Liberal Democrats		Swing	+11.8	

2013 Eastleigh by-election
Party	Candidate	Votes	%	±%
Liberal Democrats	Mike Thornton	13,342	32.1	−14.4
UKIP	Diane James	11,571	27.8	+24.2
Conservative	Maria Hutchings	10,559	25.4	−13.9
Labour	John O'Farrell	4,088	9.8	+0.2
Independent	Danny Stupple	768	1.9	New
NHA	Iain Maclennan	392	0.9	New
Beer, Baccy and Crumpet Party	Ray Hall	235	0.6	New
Christian	Kevin Milburn	163	0.4	New
Monster Raving Loony	Howling Laud Hope	136	0.3	New
Peace	Jim Duggan	128	0.3	New
Elvis Loves Pets	David Bishop	72	0.2	New
English Democrat	Michael Walters	70	0.2	−0.3
TUSC	Daz Procter	62	0.2	N/A
Wessex Regionalists	Colin Bex	30	0.1	New
Majority		1,771	4.3	−2.9
Turnout		41,616	52.8	−16.5
Liberal Democrats hold		Swing	-19.3	

General election 2010: Eastleigh
Party	Candidate	Votes	%	±%
Liberal Democrats	Chris Huhne	24,966	46.5	+8.2
Conservative	Maria Hutchings	21,102	39.3	+2.1
Labour	Leo Barraclough	5,153	9.6	−11.5
UKIP	Ray Finch	1,933	3.6	+0.2
English Democrat	Tony Pewsey	249	0.5	New
Independent	Dave Stone	154	0.3	New
National Liberal	Keith Low	93	0.2	New
Majority		3,864	7.2	+6.1
Turnout		53,650	69.3	+4.9
Liberal Democrats hold		Swing	+3.0	

=== Elections in the 2000s ===
General election 2005: Eastleigh
Party	Candidate	Votes	%	±%
Liberal Democrats	Chris Huhne	19,216	38.6	−2.1
Conservative	Conor Burns	18,648	37.5	+3.2
Labour	Chris Watt	10,238	20.6	−1.3
UKIP	Christopher Murphy	1,669	3.4	+1.6
Majority		568	1.1	−5.3
Turnout		49,771	64.8	+1.0
Liberal Democrats hold		Swing	−2.6	

General election 2001: Eastleigh
Party	Candidate	Votes	%	±%
Liberal Democrats	David Chidgey	19,360	40.7	+5.6
Conservative	Conor Burns	16,302	34.3	+0.6
Labour	Sam Jaffa	10,426	21.9	−4.9
UKIP	Stephen Challis	849	1.8	+1.0
Green	Martha Lyn	636	1.3	New
Majority		3,058	6.4	+5.0
Turnout		47,573	63.8	−12.9
Liberal Democrats hold		Swing		

=== Elections in the 1990s ===
General election 1997: Eastleigh
Party	Candidate	Votes	%	±%
Liberal Democrats	David Chidgey	19,453	35.1	+5.2
Conservative	Stephen Reid	18,699	33.7	−17.2
Labour	Alan Lloyd	14,883	26.8	+7.2
Referendum	Victor Eldridge	2,013	3.6	New
UKIP	P.W. Robinson	446	0.8	New
Majority		754	1.4	N/A
Turnout		55,494	76.9	−6.0
Liberal Democrats gain from Conservative		Swing		

1994 Eastleigh by-election
Party	Candidate	Votes	%	±%
Liberal Democrats	David Chidgey	24,473	44.3	+16.3
Labour	Marilyn Birks	15,234	27.6	+6.9
Conservative	Stephen Allison	13,675	24.7	−26.6
UKIP	Nigel Farage	952	1.7	New
Monster Raving Loony	Screaming Lord Sutch	783	1.4	New
Natural Law	P. Warburton	145	0.3	New
Majority		9,239	16.7	N/A
Turnout		55,272	58.2	−24.7
Liberal Democrats gain from Conservative		Swing	+21.5	

General election 1992: Eastleigh
Party	Candidate	Votes	%	±%
Conservative	Stephen Milligan	38,998	51.3	0.0
Liberal Democrats	David Chidgey	21,296	28.0	−4.0
Labour	Johanna E. Sugrue	15,768	20.7	+4.0
Majority		17,702	23.3	+4.1
Turnout		76,062	82.9	+3.6
Conservative hold		Swing	+2.0	

=== Elections in the 1980s ===
General election 1987: Eastleigh
Party	Candidate	Votes	%	±%
Conservative	David Price	35,584	51.3	+0.3
Liberal	Martin Kyrle	22,229	32.0	+1.5
Labour	David Bull	11,599	16.7	−1.8
Majority		13,355	19.2	−1.3
Turnout		69,412	79.3	+2.3
Conservative hold		Swing	-0.6	

General election 1983: Eastleigh
Party	Candidate	Votes	%	±%
Conservative	David Price	32,393	51.0	−4.9
Liberal	Martin Kyrle	19,385	30.5	+12.9
Labour	Peter Hallmann	11,736	18.5	−8.0
Majority		13,008	20.5	−9.0
Turnout		63,514	77.0	−3.7
Conservative hold		Swing	N/A	

=== Elections in the 1970s ===
General election 1979: Eastleigh
Party	Candidate	Votes	%	±%
Conservative	David Price	38,516	55.92	+10.95
Labour	C.E. Roberts	18,222	26.45	−5.43
Liberal	G.D. Johnson	12,143	17.63	−5.52
Majority		20,294	29.47	+16.39
Turnout		68,881	80.66	+1.85
Conservative hold		Swing	+8.19	

General election October 1974: Eastleigh
Party	Candidate	Votes	%	±%
Conservative	David Price	26,869	44.97	+0.48
Labour	E. Presman	19,054	31.89	+3.18
Liberal	G.D. Johnson	13,832	23.15	−5.56
Majority		7,815	13.08	−2.70
Turnout		59,755	78.81	−6.52
Conservative hold		Swing	-1.83	

General election February 1974: Eastleigh
Party	Candidate	Votes	%	±%
Conservative	David Price	28,512	44.49	−6.54
Labour	E. Presman	18,402	28.71	−8.76
Liberal	G.D. Johnson	17,178	26.80	+15.30
Majority		10,110	15.78	+2.22
Turnout		64,092	85.33	+6.89
Conservative hold		Swing	-1.11	

General election 1970: Eastleigh
Party	Candidate	Votes	%	±%
Conservative	David Price	30,300	51.03	+5.62
Labour	Robert TF Flach	22,248	37.47	−6.64
Liberal	Christopher J Clayton	6,825	11.50	+1.02
Majority		8,052	13.56	+12.26
Turnout		59,373	78.42	−5.32
Conservative hold		Swing	+6.13	

=== Elections in the 1960s ===
General election 1966: Eastleigh
Party	Candidate	Votes	%	±%
Conservative	David Price	24,337	45.41	−0.12
Labour	JA Antony Evans	23,636	44.11	+3.63
Liberal	John Foster-Rice	5,617	10.48	−2.51
Majority		701	1.30	−2.75
Turnout		53,590	83.74	−0.15
Conservative hold		Swing	-1.75	

General election 1964: Eastleigh
Party	Candidate	Votes	%	±%
Conservative	David Price	23,429	45.53	−7.96
Labour	Jonathan SF Boswell	21,341	41.48	−5.03
Liberal	John Foster-Rice	6,685	12.99	New
Majority		2,088	4.05	−2.93
Turnout		51,455	83.89	−0.56
Conservative hold		Swing	-1.46	

=== Elections in the 1950s ===
General election 1959: Eastleigh
Party	Candidate	Votes	%	±%
Conservative	David Price	24,949	53.49	+2.81
Labour	Christopher Rowland	21,693	46.51	−2.81
Majority		3,256	6.98	+5.62
Turnout		46,642	84.47	−3.05
Conservative hold		Swing	+2.81	

General election 1955: Eastleigh
Party	Candidate	Votes	%	±%
Conservative	David Price	20,215	50.68	
Labour	John Haire	19,670	49.32	
Majority		545	1.36	
Turnout		39,885	81.52	
Conservative win (new seat)				

== See also ==
- parliamentary constituencies in Hampshire
- List of parliamentary constituencies in the South East England (region)
