= 2013 Eastleigh by-election =

2013 UK Parliamentary by-election

- 28 February 2013

Eastleigh seat in the House of Commons
- Turnout: 52.8%
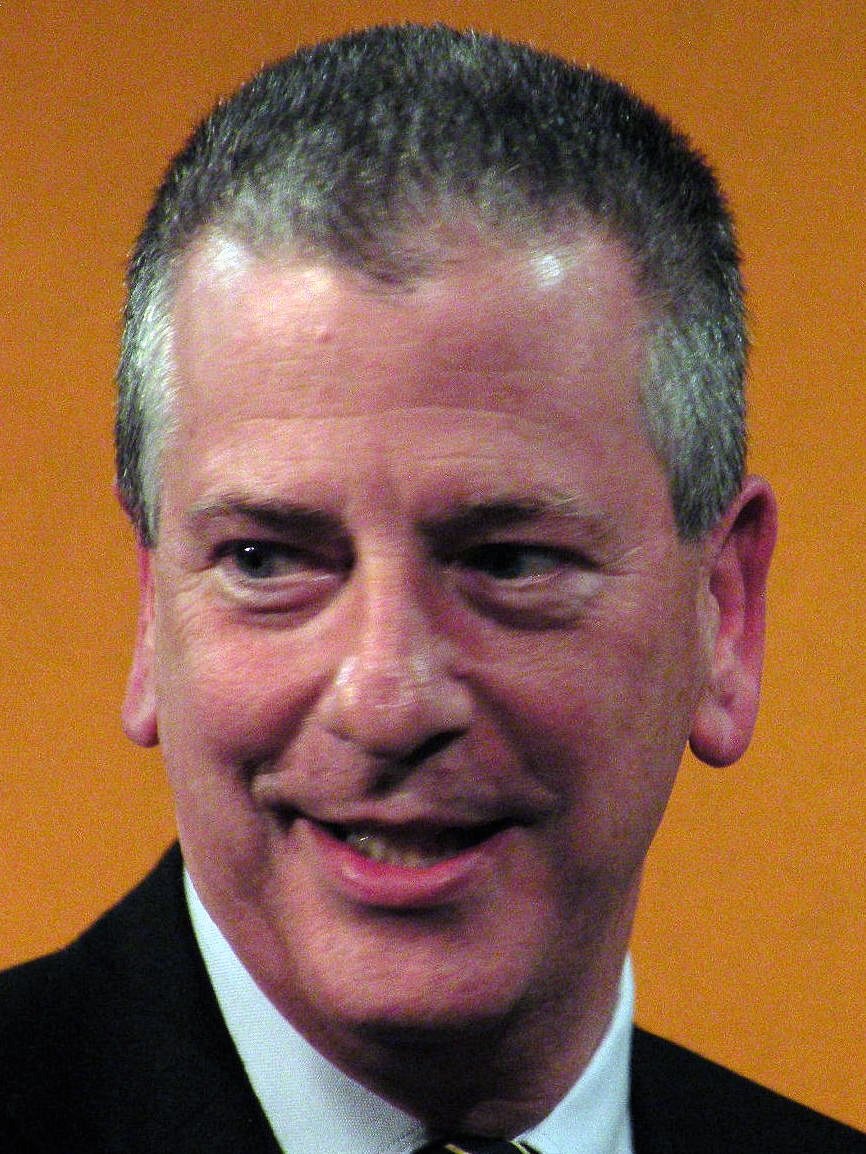

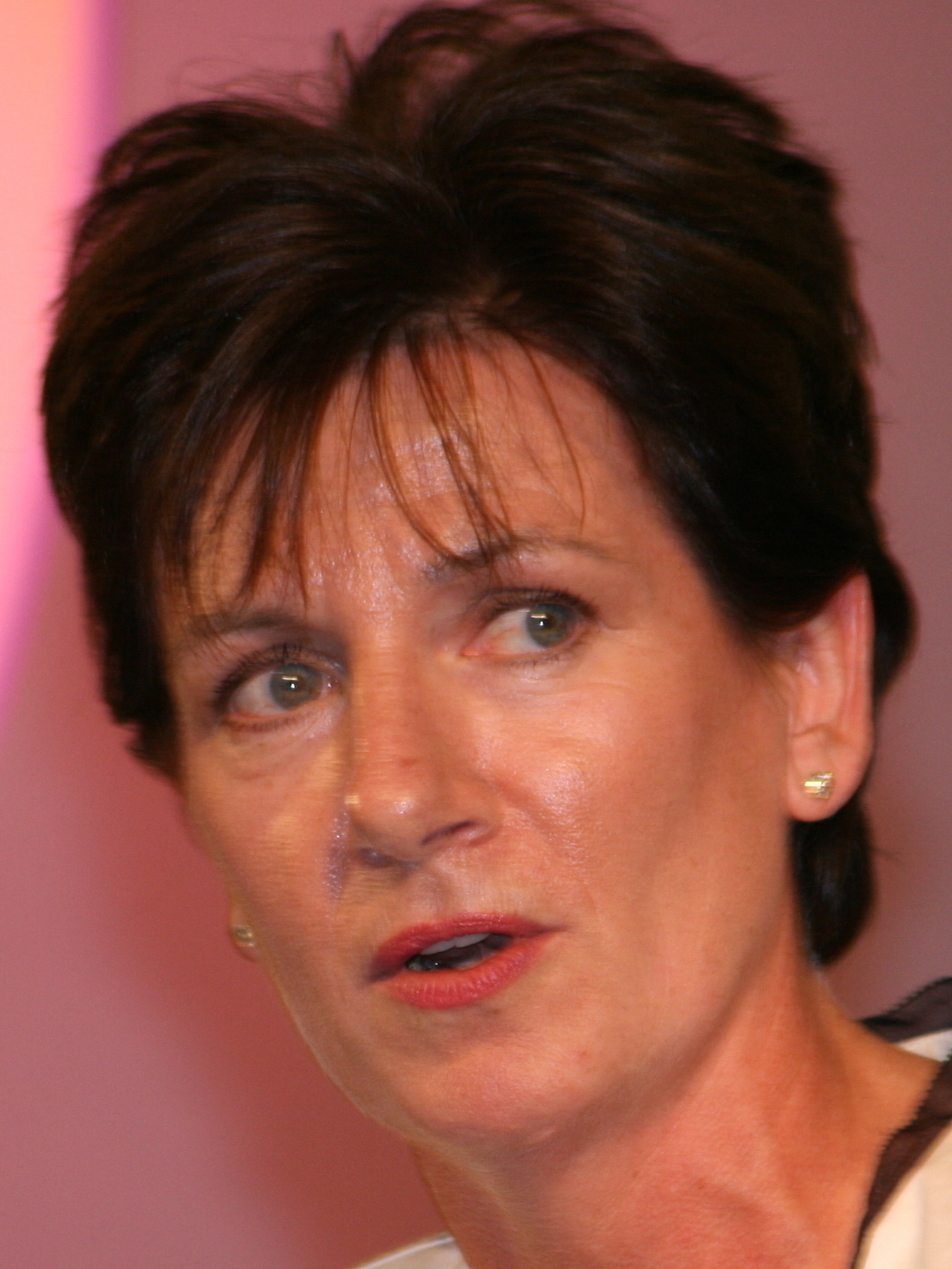
	First party	Second party
Candidate	Mike Thornton	Diane James
Party	Liberal Democrats	UKIP
Popular vote	13,342	11,571
Percentage	32.1%	27.8%
Swing	▼14.4 pp	▲24.2 pp
	Third party	Fourth party
Candidate	Maria Hutchings	John O'Farrell
Party	Conservative	Labour
Popular vote	10,559	4,088
Percentage	25.4%	9.8%
Swing	▼13.9 pp	▲0.2 pp
MP before election
Chris Huhne
Liberal Democrats
Subsequent MP
Mike Thornton
Liberal Democrats

A by-election for the United Kingdom parliamentary constituency of Eastleigh was held on 28 February 2013, triggered by the resignation of incumbent Liberal Democrat MP Chris Huhne after being convicted of perverting the course of justice in relation to speeding offences. It was won by Mike Thornton, who retained the seat for the Liberal Democrats, though with a reduced majority. UKIP came second with a greatly increased share of the vote.

== Background ==
The by-election was triggered by the resignation of the sitting MP, Liberal Democrat Chris Huhne, which took effect on 5 February 2013. The resignation coincided with his guilty plea on the eve of a court case in which he and his ex-wife Vicky Pryce were to be prosecuted for lying to police about a previous speeding offence which was committed in 2003 but only came to light in May 2011. Huhne had already stood down from his position as the Secretary of State for Energy and Climate Change in February 2012 when first charged.

Huhne and Pryce were subsequently sentenced to eight months in prison on 11 March 2013. However, they were both released after only two months on 13 May, subject to electronic tagging.

== Selection of candidates ==
The Statement of Persons Nominated was published on 13 February and confirmed 14 candidates for the by-election. The defending party, the Liberal Democrats, nominated Eastleigh Borough Council councillor Mike Thornton.

Maria Hutchings, the Conservatives' candidate at the general election, was chosen as the candidate for the by-election on 7 February. Hutchings came to prominence in 2005 when she interrupted a live television phone-in with the then Prime Minister Tony Blair. She said that she would vote for Britain to leave the EU and would have voted against gay marriage. She also identified as pro-life and says that she is not a "Tory toff".

The Labour Party chose author and broadcaster John O'Farrell as its candidate on 12 February. Having received during the campaign negative coverage of selected quotations from a book he wrote in 1998, in which he recalled the Brighton bomb attacks against the Conservative Party and then Prime Minister Margaret Thatcher, O'Farrell reflected after polling day that the experience was enough to put him off electoral politics for good.

UKIP Eastleigh selected candidate Diane James, a Councillor from Ewhurst in Waverley, Surrey, who was elected there as an independent and subsequently joined UKIP. The party's leader, Nigel Farage, previously contested the seat at a by-election in 1994. While he initially said he would consider standing again, he decided not to after much media speculation.

The English Democrats fielded Michael Walters, the South East Area Secretary of the party.

The Christian Party candidate was Kevin Milburn. He said "I am standing in this election to allow voters the opportunity to show their disapproval of this Government over many issues, including their attack on marriage. The Government has upset vast swathes of the population with this ill-conceived Bill."

The Monster Raving Loony Party, which stood in the 1994 by-election, selected its leader Howling Laud Hope as its candidate.

On 8 February, the Trade Unionist and Socialist Coalition announced that it had chosen Darren Procter, secretary of the Southampton Shipping branch of the RMT union, as their candidate. Procter also serves on the National Executive Committee of RMT. He stood on an anti-austerity platform.

The National Health Action Party, a new party founded in 2012 in response to the Coalition Government's healthcare reforms, selected Dr Iain Maclennan, a local doctor and former Royal Navy medical officer, as their candidate.

Independent candidate Danny Stupple stood in protest at gay marriage and what he describes as the party "machine" pushing it through Parliament.

The Wessex Regionalist Party fielded the party's president, Colin Bex, as its candidate.

== Polling ==
Date(s) conducted	Polling organisation/client	Sample size	LD	Con	UKIP	Lab	Others	Lead
28 Feb	Eastleigh by-election, 2013 Result	42,649	32.1%	25.4%	27.8%	9.8%	4.9%	4.3%
22–24 Feb	Populus/The Times	1,002	33%	28%	21%	12%	6%	5%
21–22 Feb	Populus/Sunday Times	1,001	33%	28%	21%	11%	4%	5%
18–22 Feb	Survation/Mail on Sunday	543	29%	33%	21%	13%	4%	4%
6–8 Feb	Survation/Mail on Sunday	504	36%	33%	16%	13%	2%	3%
4–5 Feb	Populus	1,006	31%	34%	13%	19%	3%	3%
6 May	2010 Results (Eastleigh only)	53,650	46.5%	39.3%	3.6%	9.6%	1.0%	7.2%

== Results ==
The Liberal Democrats' win was their first in a by-election since Dunfermline and West Fife seven years earlier. It was also their first and only by-election win under the leadership of Nick Clegg. The UKIP vote was their highest yet in any parliamentary election (in both share and number of votes), and was the fourth time the party had come second in a by-election. At the time, it was also the closest UKIP had come to winning a Westminster seat.

With less than 7% of the vote separating the top three candidates, it was the closest three-way result in an English by-election for over 90 years (in Penistone in 1921 there was 6% between the top three). It was also the first time since the 1989 Richmond by-election that Labour had come fourth while in opposition.

Following the election result, UKIP leader Nigel Farage and Conservative candidate Maria Hutchings each blamed the other party for splitting the vote and allowing the Liberal Democrats to win.

Election	Political result	Candidate	Party	Votes	%	±%
Eastleigh by-election 2013; Resignation of Chris Huhne; Turnout: 41,616 (52.8%) –16.5	Liberal Democrats hold Majority: 1,771 (4.3%) -2.9; Swing: 19.3% from Lib Dem to UKIP	Mike Thornton	Liberal Democrats	13,342	32.1	–14.4
Eastleigh by-election 2013; Resignation of Chris Huhne; Turnout: 41,616 (52.8%) –16.5	Liberal Democrats hold Majority: 1,771 (4.3%) -2.9; Swing: 19.3% from Lib Dem to UKIP	Diane James	UKIP	11,571	27.8	+24.2
Eastleigh by-election 2013; Resignation of Chris Huhne; Turnout: 41,616 (52.8%) –16.5	Liberal Democrats hold Majority: 1,771 (4.3%) -2.9; Swing: 19.3% from Lib Dem to UKIP	Maria Hutchings	Conservative	10,559	25.4	–13.9
Eastleigh by-election 2013; Resignation of Chris Huhne; Turnout: 41,616 (52.8%) –16.5	Liberal Democrats hold Majority: 1,771 (4.3%) -2.9; Swing: 19.3% from Lib Dem to UKIP	John O'Farrell	Labour	4,088	9.8	+0.2
Eastleigh by-election 2013; Resignation of Chris Huhne; Turnout: 41,616 (52.8%) –16.5	Liberal Democrats hold Majority: 1,771 (4.3%) -2.9; Swing: 19.3% from Lib Dem to UKIP	Danny Stupple	Independent	768	1.8	New
Eastleigh by-election 2013; Resignation of Chris Huhne; Turnout: 41,616 (52.8%) –16.5	Liberal Democrats hold Majority: 1,771 (4.3%) -2.9; Swing: 19.3% from Lib Dem to UKIP	Iain Maclennan	NHA	392	0.9	New
Eastleigh by-election 2013; Resignation of Chris Huhne; Turnout: 41,616 (52.8%) –16.5	Liberal Democrats hold Majority: 1,771 (4.3%) -2.9; Swing: 19.3% from Lib Dem to UKIP	Ray Hall	Beer, Baccy and Crumpet	235	0.6	New
Eastleigh by-election 2013; Resignation of Chris Huhne; Turnout: 41,616 (52.8%) –16.5	Liberal Democrats hold Majority: 1,771 (4.3%) -2.9; Swing: 19.3% from Lib Dem to UKIP	Kevin Milburn	Christian	163	0.4	New
Eastleigh by-election 2013; Resignation of Chris Huhne; Turnout: 41,616 (52.8%) –16.5	Liberal Democrats hold Majority: 1,771 (4.3%) -2.9; Swing: 19.3% from Lib Dem to UKIP	Howling Laud Hope	Monster Raving Loony	136	0.3	New
Eastleigh by-election 2013; Resignation of Chris Huhne; Turnout: 41,616 (52.8%) –16.5	Liberal Democrats hold Majority: 1,771 (4.3%) -2.9; Swing: 19.3% from Lib Dem to UKIP	Jim Duggan	Peace	128	0.3	New
Eastleigh by-election 2013; Resignation of Chris Huhne; Turnout: 41,616 (52.8%) –16.5	Liberal Democrats hold Majority: 1,771 (4.3%) -2.9; Swing: 19.3% from Lib Dem to UKIP	David Bishop	Elvis Loves Pets	72	0.2	New
Eastleigh by-election 2013; Resignation of Chris Huhne; Turnout: 41,616 (52.8%) –16.5	Liberal Democrats hold Majority: 1,771 (4.3%) -2.9; Swing: 19.3% from Lib Dem to UKIP	Michael Walters	English Democrat	70	0.1	–0.3
Eastleigh by-election 2013; Resignation of Chris Huhne; Turnout: 41,616 (52.8%) –16.5	Liberal Democrats hold Majority: 1,771 (4.3%) -2.9; Swing: 19.3% from Lib Dem to UKIP	Daz Proctor	TUSC	62	0.1	New
Eastleigh by-election 2013; Resignation of Chris Huhne; Turnout: 41,616 (52.8%) –16.5	Liberal Democrats hold Majority: 1,771 (4.3%) -2.9; Swing: 19.3% from Lib Dem to UKIP	Colin Bex	Wessex Regionalists	30	0.1	New

Election	Political result	Candidate	Party	Votes	%	±%
General election 2010; Turnout: 53,650 (69.3%) +4.9	Liberal Democrats hold Majority: 3,864 (7.2%); Swing: 3.0% from Con to Lib Dem	Chris Huhne	Liberal Democrats	24,966	46.5	+8.2
General election 2010; Turnout: 53,650 (69.3%) +4.9	Liberal Democrats hold Majority: 3,864 (7.2%); Swing: 3.0% from Con to Lib Dem	Maria Hutchings	Conservative	21,102	39.3	+2.1
General election 2010; Turnout: 53,650 (69.3%) +4.9	Liberal Democrats hold Majority: 3,864 (7.2%); Swing: 3.0% from Con to Lib Dem	Leo Barraclough	Labour	5,153	9.6	–11.5
General election 2010; Turnout: 53,650 (69.3%) +4.9	Liberal Democrats hold Majority: 3,864 (7.2%); Swing: 3.0% from Con to Lib Dem	Ray Finch	UKIP	1,933	3.6	+0.2
General election 2010; Turnout: 53,650 (69.3%) +4.9	Liberal Democrats hold Majority: 3,864 (7.2%); Swing: 3.0% from Con to Lib Dem	Tony Pewsey	English Democrat	249	0.5	New
General election 2010; Turnout: 53,650 (69.3%) +4.9	Liberal Democrats hold Majority: 3,864 (7.2%); Swing: 3.0% from Con to Lib Dem	Dave Stone	Independent	154	0.3	New
General election 2010; Turnout: 53,650 (69.3%) +4.9	Liberal Democrats hold Majority: 3,864 (7.2%); Swing: 3.0% from Con to Lib Dem	Keith Low	National Liberal Party – Third Way	93	0.2	New

== See also ==
- 1994 Eastleigh by-election
- List of United Kingdom by-elections (2010–present)
- Opinion polling for the 2015 United Kingdom general election
- Opinion polling in United Kingdom constituencies (2010–2015)
