= 1994 Eastleigh by-election =

UK parliamentary by-election

- 9 June 1994
- Turnout: 58.7% (▼24.2%)
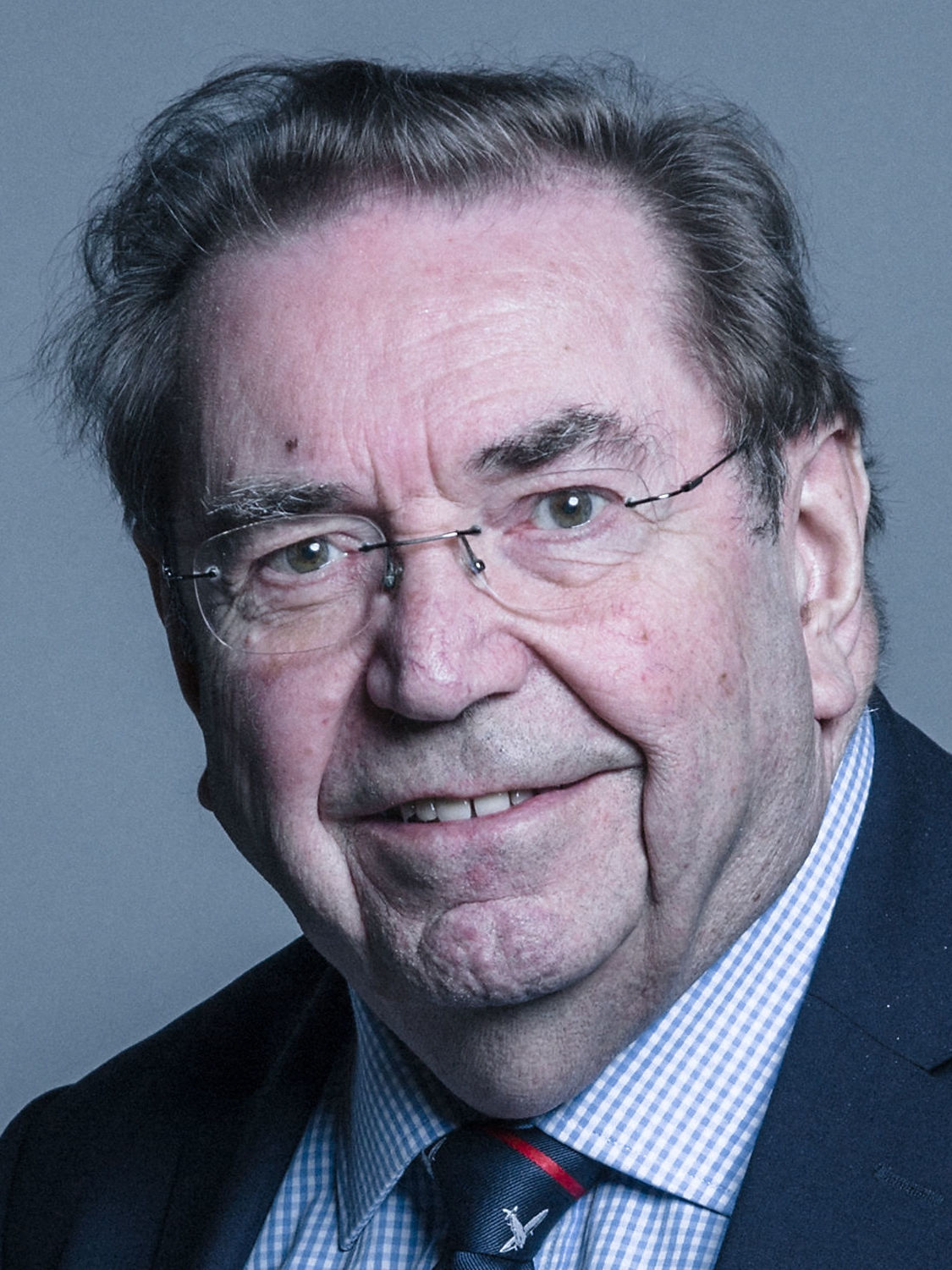
| | First party | Second party | Third party |
|---|---|---|---|
| | | Lab | Con |
| Candidate | David Chidgey | Marilyn Birks | Stephen Reid |
| Party | Liberal Democrats | Labour | Conservative |
| Popular vote | 24,473 | 15,234 | 13,675 |
| Percentage | 44.3% | 27.6% | 24.7% |
| Swing | ▲16.3% | ▲6.8% | ▼26.5% |
MP before election
Stephen Milligan
Conservative
Elected MP
David Chidgey
Liberal Democrats

The 1994 Eastleigh by-election was a parliamentary by-election held on 9 June 1994 for the United Kingdom House of Commons constituency of Eastleigh in Hampshire. The seat had fallen vacant because of the death of Conservative Party Member of Parliament (MP) Stephen Milligan on 7 February.

The result of the election was a gain for the Liberal Democrats on a large swing. A disastrous result for the Conservative Party saw them fall to third place. The election, along with the EU elections and three other by-elections held that day, were the first election that the newly formed UK Independence Party (UKIP) stood in, with Nigel Farage as the candidate; Farage went on to become the leader of UKIP in 2006. He would later win election to the constituency of Clacton in Essex in 2024 as leader of Reform UK, formerly the Brexit Party.

== Result ==
Eastleigh by-election, 1994
| Party | Candidate | Votes | % | ±% |
|---|---|---|---|---|
| Liberal Democrats | David Chidgey | 24,473 | 44.3 | +16.3 |
| Labour | Marilyn Birks | 15,234 | 27.6 | +6.8 |
| Conservative | Stephen Reid | 13,675 | 24.7 | −26.5 |
| UKIP | Nigel Farage | 952 | 1.7 | New |
| Monster Raving Loony | David Sutch | 783 | 1.4 | New |
| Natural Law | Peter Warburton | 145 | 0.3 | New |
| Majority | | 9,239 | 16.7 | N/A |
| Turnout | | 55,262 | 58.7 | −24.2 |
| Liberal Democrats gain from Conservative | | Swing | −16.8 | |

== Previous result ==
General election 1992: Eastleigh
| Party | Candidate | Votes | % | ±% |
|---|---|---|---|---|
| Conservative | Stephen Milligan | 38,998 | 51.3 | 0.0 |
| Liberal Democrats | David Chidgey | 21,296 | 28.0 | −4.0 |
| Labour | Jo Sugrue | 15,768 | 20.7 | +4.0 |
| Majority | | 17,702 | 23.3 | +4.1 |
| Turnout | | 76,062 | 82.9 | +3.6 |
| Conservative hold | | Swing | +2.0 | |

== See also ==
- 2013 Eastleigh by-election
- Eastleigh (UK Parliament constituency)
- The town of Eastleigh
