= Borough of Eastleigh =

- Non-metropolitan borough and borough
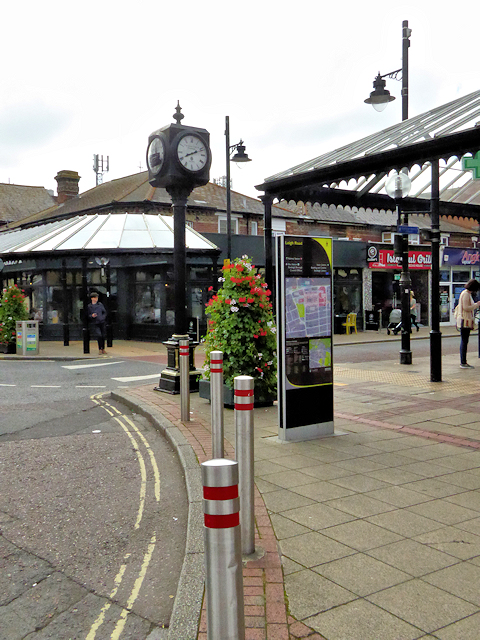

- Shown within Hampshire
- Coordinates: 50°56′56″N 1°18′38″W
- Sovereign state: United Kingdom
- Constituent country: England
- Region: South East England
- County: Hampshire
- Admin HQ: Eastleigh
- Incorporated: 1936
- Reformed: 1 April 1974

Government
  - Type: District
  - Governing body: Eastleigh Borough Council
  - MPs: Liz Jarvis (LD); Danny Chambers (LD); Paul Holmes (CON)

Area
  - Total: 31 sq mi (80 km^{2})

Population (2024)
  - Total: 142,933 (Ranked 163rd)
  - Density: 4,650/sq mi (1,794/km^{2})

Ethnicity (2021)
  - Ethnic groups: List: 92.4% White; 3.9% Asian; 2.1% Mixed; 1% Black; 0.7% other

Religion (2021)
  - Religion: List: 45.7% Christianity; 45% no religion; 5.6% not stated; 1% Islam; 1% Hinduism; 0.7% Sikhism; 0.5% other; 0.4% Buddhism; 0.1% Judaism
- Time zone: UTC+0 (Greenwich Mean Time)
- Postcode: SO
- Area codes: 023, 01489
- ONS code: 24UD

The Borough of Eastleigh is a local government district with borough status in Hampshire, England. It is named after its main town of Eastleigh, where the council is based. The borough also contains the town of Hedge End along with several villages, many of which form part of the South Hampshire urban area.

The neighbouring districts are Fareham, Winchester, Test Valley, Southampton and (across Southampton Water) New Forest. Water bounds much of the borough, with Southampton Water and the River Hamble bordering the east and southwest of the district. The borough lies within the Hampshire Basin.

The original Eastleigh borough was formed in 1936 following the incorporation of the former Eastleigh Urban District Council. The borough as it is today was formed in 1974, when the existing Borough of Eastleigh expanded to include part of the former Winchester Rural District as a result of the Local Government Act 1972. The borough's Latin motto, "Salus populi suprema lex" translates as "The Welfare of the People is the most important Law".

The borough is served by two motorways and seven railway stations as well as an international airport. There is also a ferry linking Hamble-le-Rice in Eastleigh to Warsash in Fareham, and a disused canal running through the north of the borough.

There are eight scheduled monuments and around 180 listed buildings in the borough, with Netley Abbey, Bursledon Windmill, the chapel of Netley Hospital, and Netley Castle among them. The borough also contains eight conservation areas and around 20,000 trees protected by tree preservation orders.

== History ==
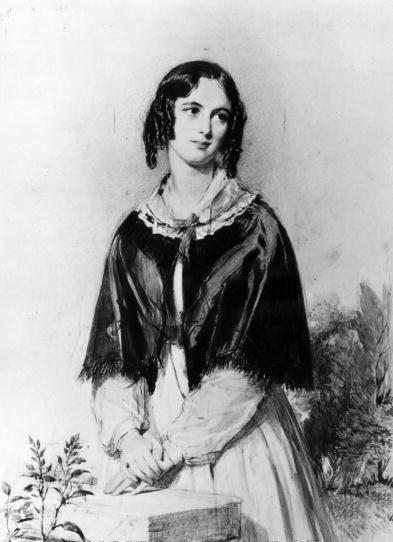
Charlotte Yonge gave Eastleigh its name.

The borough's origins begin with the formation of an ecclesiastical parish covering the hamlets of Eastley and Barton in 1868, in an area which was beginning to be developed around Bishopstoke railway station which had opened in 1839 to serve the older village of Bishopstoke a mile to the east. Author Charlotte Mary Yonge, a resident of Otterbourne, donated £500 (£50,000 at 2025 values) towards the cost of building a parish church and in return was asked which of the two villages to name the parish after; she chose Eastley, but also chose to alter the spelling to Eastleigh as she considered this more modern. The parish grew rapidly: it had a population of 515 in 1871, over 1,000 in 1881 and 3,613 in 1891.

Despite the creation of the ecclesiastical parish, Eastleigh remained part of the civil parish of South Stoneham. In order to facilitate the creation of pavements with kerbs, drains and sewers, and street lights, a local government district covering the ecclesiastical parish of Eastleigh was established in 1893, governed by a local board. Such districts were converted into urban districts in 1894, when Eastleigh was also made its own civil parish. Eastleigh Urban District was enlarged to take in the community of Bishopstoke in 1899, becoming the Eastleigh and Bishopstoke Urban District. The name was changed back to just Eastleigh in 1932.

The first Eastleigh Borough was incorporated in 1936 under the Municipal Corporations Act 1882. This conversion from Eastleigh Urban District Council to Eastleigh Borough Council allowed the authority to create byelaws and appoint a mayor. Notice of the petition for incorporation was served on the 1 February 1936, and the matter being raised for consideration on 16 March, along with petitions for the creation of boroughs for Crosby and Sale in North West England, among others.

The modern borough was created in 1974 under the Local Government Act 1972, covering the former borough plus seven parishes from the Winchester Rural District, being Botley, Bursledon, Fair Oak, Hamble, Hedge End, Hound and West End. Eastleigh's borough status passed to the enlarged district from its creation, allowing the chair of the council to take the title of mayor, continuing Eastleigh's series of mayors dating back to 1936.

In 2006, the borough was ranked the ninth best place to live in the UK by a Channel 4 programme.

In March 2026, the government announced that it would abolish the borough in 2028 as part of local government reform across Hampshire. These proposals were withdrawn in September 2026.

== Governance ==
Eastleigh Borough Council

Type
- Type: Non-metropolitan district

Leadership
- Mayor: Richard Gomer, Liberal Democrat since 18 May 2026
- Leader: Keith House, Liberal Democrat since 1994
- Chief Executive (interim): David Williams since March 2026

Structure
- Seats: 39 councillors
- Political groups: Administration (35) Liberal Democrats (35) Other parties (4) Independent (3) Conservative (1)

Elections
- Voting system: First past the post
- Last election: 7 May 2026

Meeting place
- Eastleigh House, Upper Market Street, Eastleigh, SO50 9YN

Website
- www.eastleigh.gov.uk

Eastleigh Borough Council provides district-level services. County-level services are provided by Hampshire County Council. The whole borough is also covered by civil parishes, which form a third tier of local government.

The council has a strong tradition of attending to environmental matters and in 2008 was named a beacon council under the theme "Tackling Climate Change".

=== Political control ===
The council has been under Liberal Democrat majority control since 1994.

The first election to the council was held in 1973, initially acting as a shadow authority alongside the outgoing authorities until the new arrangements took effect on 1 April 1974. Political control since 1974 has been as follows:

Party in control	Years
No overall control	1974–1976
Conservative	1976–1983
No overall control	1983–1988
Liberal Democrats	1988–1990
No overall control	1990–1994
Liberal Democrats	1994–present

=== Leadership ===
The role of mayor is largely ceremonial in Eastleigh. Political leadership is instead provided by the leader of the council. The leaders since 1976 have been:

Councillor	Party	From	To
Godfrey Olson	Conservative	1976	1986
Margaret Kyrle	Liberal	1986	1988
Margaret Kyrle	Liberal Democrats	1988	1990
Godfrey Olson	Conservative	1990	1994
Keith House	Liberal Democrats	1994	

=== Composition ===
Following the 2026 election the composition of the council was:

Party	Seats
Liberal Democrats	35
Independent	3
Conservative	1
Total	39

Under current plans, Eastleigh Borough Council will be abolished in 2028, and replaced with a new South West Hampshire unitary authority, including Southampton. Elections to this new authority would take place in 2027.

=== Elections ===
Since the last boundary changes in 2018 the council has comprised 39 councillors representing 14 wards, with each ward electing two or three councillors. Elections are held three years out of every four, with roughly a third of the council being elected each time for a four-year term of office. Hampshire County Council elections are held in the fourth year of the cycle when there are no borough council elections.

Much of the borough is covered by the Eastleigh parliamentary constituency, represented by Liz Jarvis of the Liberal Democrats. The remaining wards, which include Hedge End, Botley, Netley and Hamble-le-Rice, form nearly half of the Hamble Valley constituency, represented by Paul Holmes of the Conservatives.

=== Premises ===
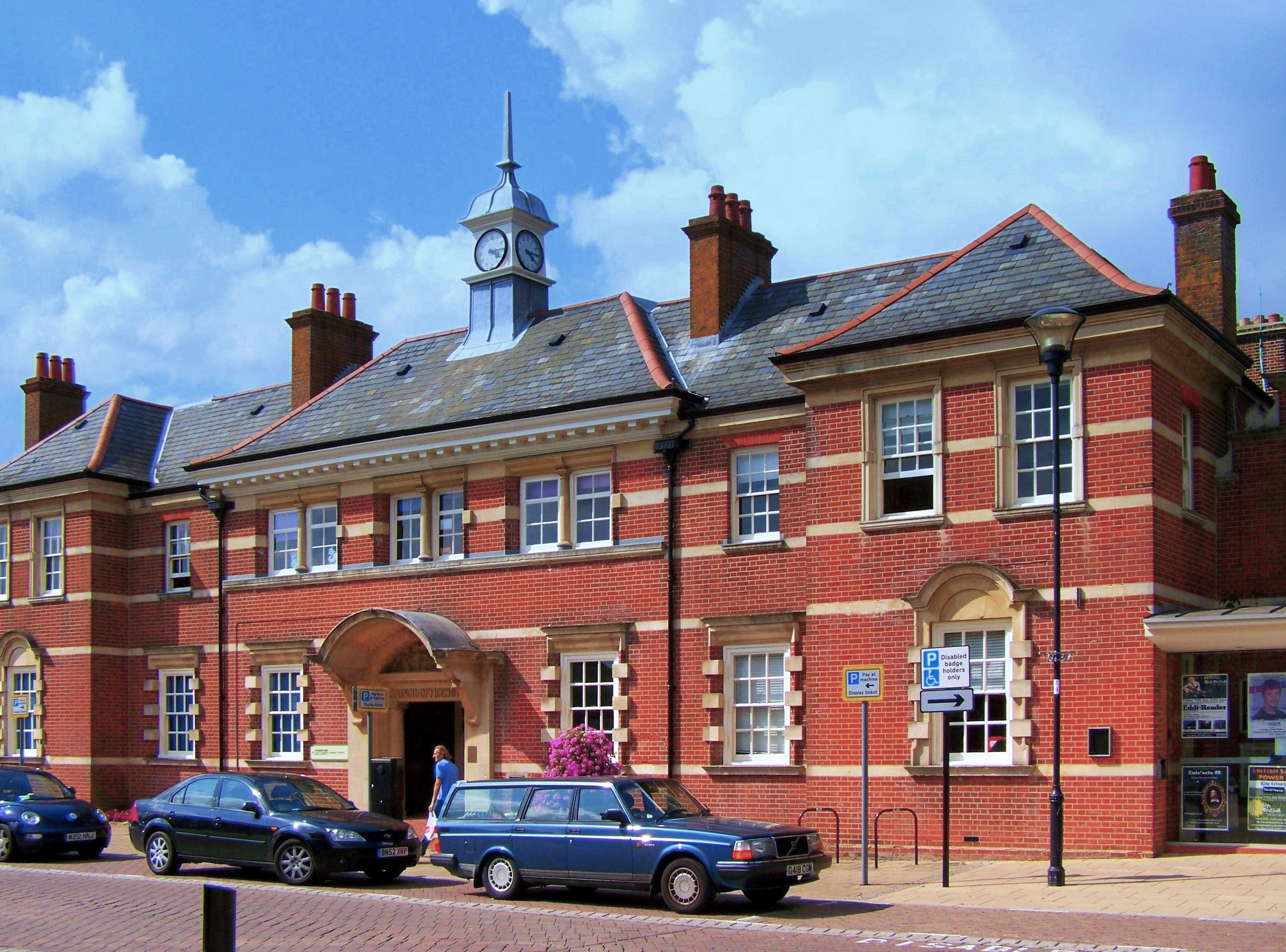
Old Town Hall, Leigh Road: Council's headquarters 1899–1974, now The Point theatre

The council has its main offices at Eastleigh House on Upper Market Street in Eastleigh. The building does not have a council chamber and so full council meetings are held in various locations, including The Point, a theatre which is the former town hall that was built in 1899 for the old Eastleigh and Bishopstoke Urban District Council. It remained the town hall until 1974 when new offices were built at the junction of Leigh Road and Villeneuve St Georges Way.

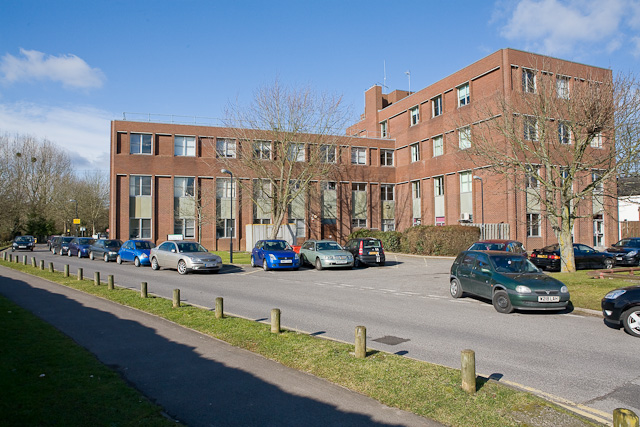
Civic Offices, Leigh Road: Council's headquarters 1974–2014, since demolished.

Between 1974 and 2014 the council was based at Civic Offices on Leigh Road, before moving to Eastleigh House, an existing office building in the town centre which was refurbished and extended to become the council's main offices.

== Geography ==
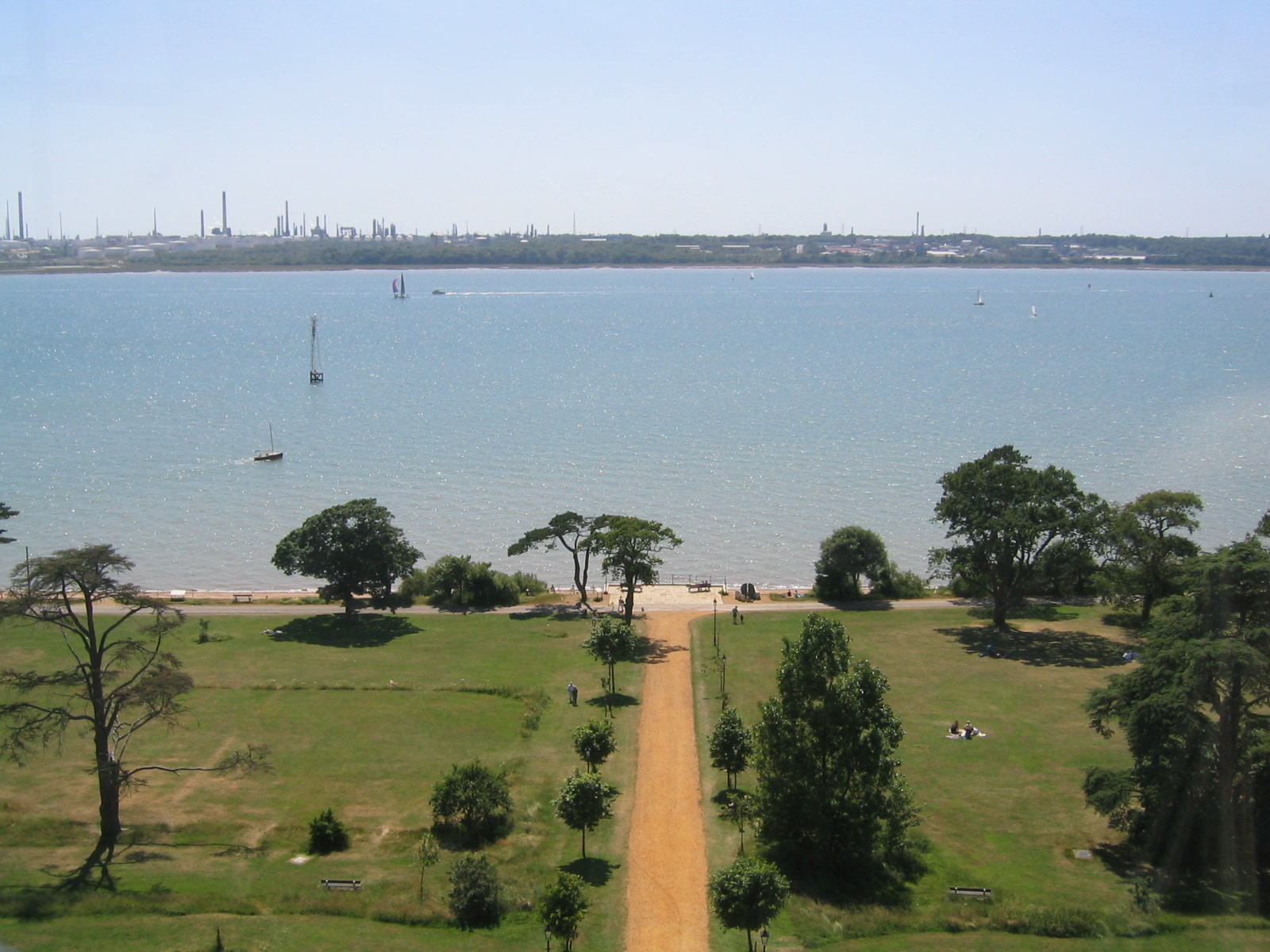
The view over Southampton Water from the Royal Victoria Country Park

The southern part of the borough is bounded on the east by the River Hamble (separating it from Fareham) and on the west by Southampton Water (separating it from the New Forest). The Hamble flows into Southampton Water at Hamble-le-Rice, thus accounting for the borough's southern boundary. Further north, the borough borders Southampton to the west and the City of Winchester district to the north. As well as Southampton Water and the River Hamble, a number of watercourses flow through Eastleigh, including the River Itchen, Monks Brook and the Itchen Navigation.

The largest settlement in the borough is the town of Eastleigh itself, with a continuous urban area which now includes Chandler's Ford, Bishopstoke and Boyatt Wood. The only other settlement in the borough with town status is Hedge End. Due to the urban nature of Southampton and the town of Eastleigh, the western side of the borough is generally more built up than the east. There are three country parks in the borough, Itchen Valley in West End and Lakeside, located just to the south of the town of Eastleigh, are managed by the borough council while Royal Victoria Country Park is managed by Hampshire County Council.

The borough is within the Hampshire Basin, with an underlying geology of mainly Cretaceous chalk.

Soil in the borough is principally of poor to moderate agricultural quality although high grade land is present in pockets. The south of the borough has acid soils and gravels, but poorly drained clays predominate in the north. Most of the borough is covered by a series of clays and marls, with sandy and lignitic beds, part of the Bracklesham Group of beds. As well as clay soils, the Bracklesham Beds result in some bands of sandy soil to the north of West End, and podzol soils around the M27 motorway west of Hedge End and on small areas of the gravels on top of the beds themselves. However most of the soil over the beds is more fertile brown earth.

In the north of the borough, small pockets of valley gravels, London clay, Brickearth and Alluvium can be found, although these have mainly been built over with the exception of the Alluvium, which forms peaty soils around the floodplain of the River Itchen.

=== Climate ===
As with the rest of the UK, Eastleigh experiences an oceanic climate (Köppen Cfb). The nearest weather station to the Borough is in Southampton, which has held the record for the highest temperature in the UK for June at 35.6 °C (96.1 °F) since 1976.

Climate data for Southampton (nearest weather station to the Borough of Eastleigh), elevation 3 m, 1981–2010
Month	Jan	Feb	Mar	Apr	May	Jun	Jul	Aug	Sep	Oct	Nov	Dec	Year
Mean daily maximum °C (°F)	8.4 (47.1)	8.6 (47.5)	11.1 (52.0)	14.0 (57.2)	17.5 (63.5)	20.2 (68.4)	22.4 (72.3)	22.3 (72.1)	19.8 (67.6)	15.6 (60.1)	11.7 (53.1)	8.9 (48.0)	15.1 (59.2)
Mean daily minimum °C (°F)	2.9 (37.2)	2.6 (36.7)	4.1 (39.4)	5.7 (42.3)	9.0 (48.2)	11.7 (53.1)	13.7 (56.7)	13.7 (56.7)	11.4 (52.5)	8.9 (48.0)	5.4 (41.7)	3.2 (37.8)	7.7 (45.9)
Average rainfall mm (inches)	81.4 (3.20)	58.3 (2.30)	60.0 (2.36)	50.7 (2.00)	49.0 (1.93)	50.4 (1.98)	42.0 (1.65)	50.4 (1.98)	60.4 (2.38)	93.8 (3.69)	94.0 (3.70)	89.2 (3.51)	779.4 (30.69)
Average rainy days (≥ 1.0 mm)	12.2	9.2	10.1	8.8	8.2	7.7	7.4	7.7	8.7	11.5	11.5	11.8	114.7
Mean monthly sunshine hours	63.3	84.4	118.3	179.8	212.1	211.2	221.8	207.7	148.1	113.0	76.6	52.9	1,689.3
Source 1: Met Office (normals)
Source 2: Calculated from Met Office Data

== Demography ==
In the 2021 census, Eastleigh had a population of 136,443 people consisting of 66,700 males (48.9%) and 69,743 females (51.1%). The borough is much more densely populated than South East England and England as a whole, with a population density of 1,712.1 people per square km (South East England and England have population densities of 486.5 and 433.5 people per square km, respectively). 45.7% of Eastleigh's population state their religion as Christian, which is a significant decrease from 61.9% in 2011. 45.0% stated they had no religion (up from 28.5% in 2011) and 5.6% did not state a religion; the most popular non-Christian religions in the borough were Islam (1%), Hinduism (1%) and Sikhism (0.7%). The census also indicates that the residents of Eastleigh are generally in better health than those in England as a whole.

== Economy ==
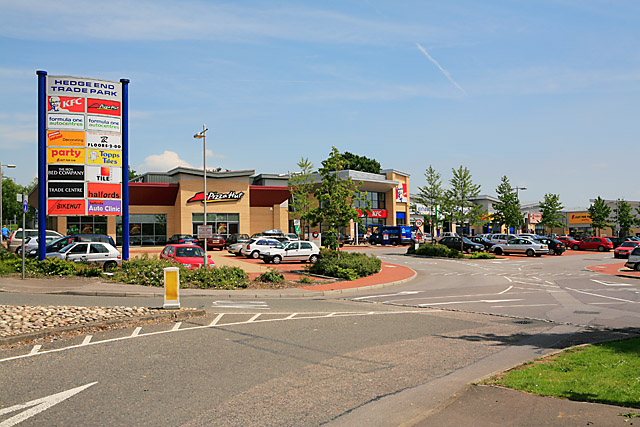
Hedge End Trade Park is part of a large retail development

Historically, the economy of the area has strong links with the transport industry. The proximity of substantial waterways made shipbuilding a major industry in the south of the borough, and today the pleasure boat industry still dominates the area around Hamble-le-Rice and Bursledon, made famous by the television drama series on the subject, Howards' Way, which was filmed in the area. The borough is also strongly linked with the Spitfire, the first test flights of which took place from Southampton Airport in Eastleigh. Eastleigh was once the heart of the London and South Western Railway, with the Eastleigh Works building most of the company's engines. At present, the works maintains South Western Railway and CrossCountry trains. The works building is now home to Arlington Fleet Services, which provides a multitude of train maintenance services. Finally, Network Rail has a yard here, from which it carries out track maintenance.

The economy of the borough today is dominated by the retail sector, which accounts for around 33 per cent of the jobs in the borough, and this proportion is rising. As well as the large Swan Centre, a shopping centre in the town of Eastleigh, there is a large out-of-town retail development near Hedge End which includes flagship stores for Marks & Spencer and Sainsbury's among others. Eastleigh also has proportionately more manufacturing and construction jobs than the nation, but the number of jobs in these sectors is declining in the borough.

The B&Q head office is in the Portswood House in Eastleigh, Eastleigh borough.

== Landmarks ==
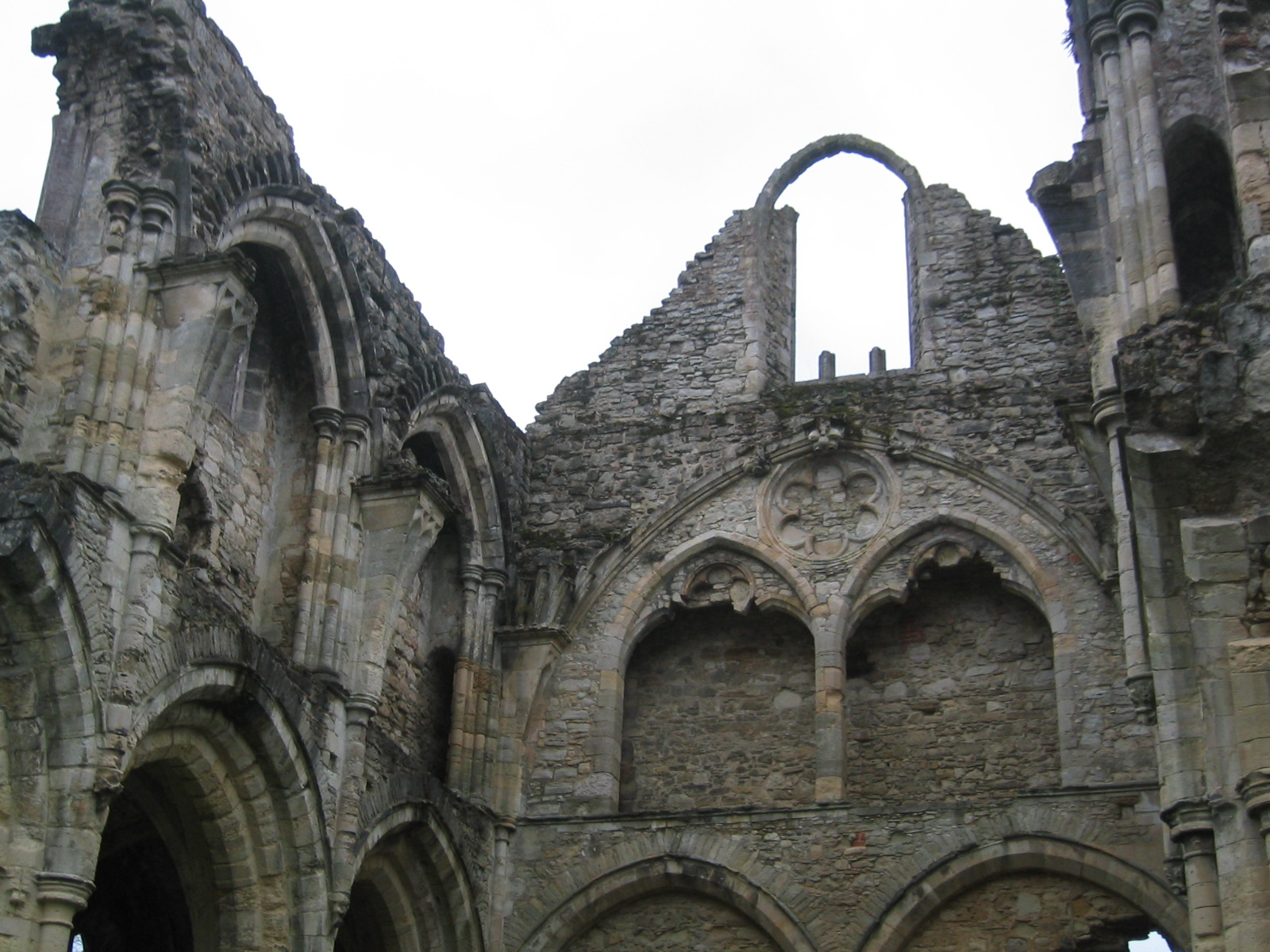
Netley Abbey is a scheduled monument.

There are eight scheduled monuments in Eastleigh, around 180 listed buildings (9 of which are Grade II* listed, the remainder are Grade II) and over 800 tree preservation orders covering 20,000 trees across 5,000 properties. The council also maintains a "local list" of buildings which are of local importance but do not meet English Heritage's listing criteria.

The area around Netley is particularly rich in notable historic landmarks, with Netley Abbey, Netley Castle and Netley Hospital all nearby. The borough also boasts Hampshire's only functioning windmill, Bursledon Windmill, and eight conservation areas.

== Transport ==
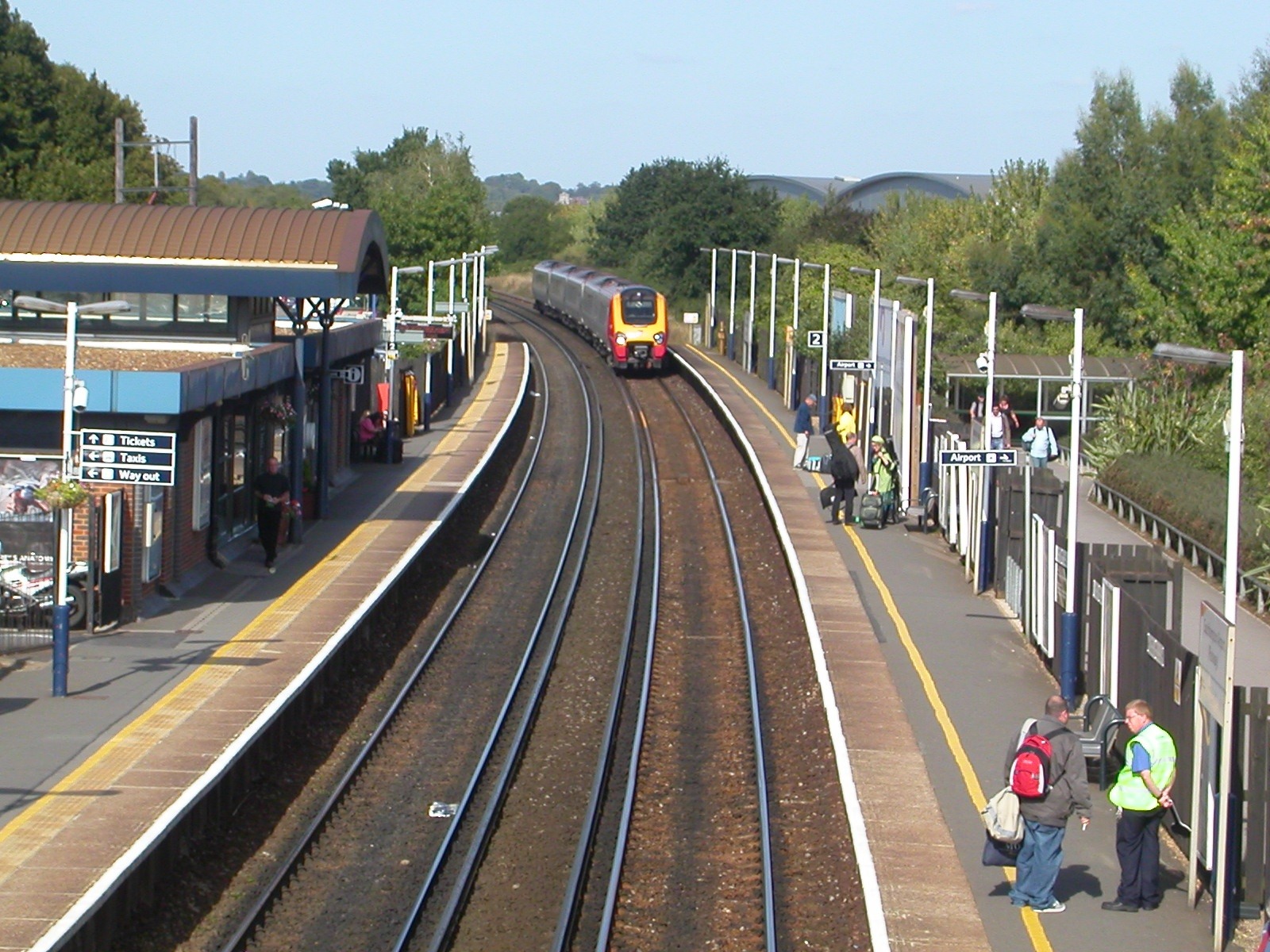
A train approaches Southampton Airport Parkway railway station on its way to Bournemouth

The M3 motorway runs through the north-west of the borough, providing a direct road route to London, and the midlands and north of England via the A34 road which joins the M3 just north of Winchester. The M27 motorway also runs through much of the borough, linking Eastleigh to the rest of the south coast.

There are seven railway stations in the borough, served by the South West Main Line, the Eastleigh to Romsey Line, the Eastleigh to Fareham Line, the West Coastway Line and the Cross Country Route. Passenger train operators serving the Eastleigh stations are South Western Railway, CrossCountry and Greater Thameslink Railway.

Southampton Airport is located in the north west of the borough, just south of the town of Eastleigh itself. The airport is the 20th largest in the United Kingdom and flights operate from there to destinations throughout the British Isles (including the Channel Islands) and some destinations in western continental Europe.

Local bus services in Eastleigh are operated by Bluestar. Stagecoach South also operate some services. National coach operators such as National Express tend not to serve Eastleigh due to the close proximity of Southampton and Winchester to the borough.

Stoke Lock on the Itchen Navigation near Bishopstoke now with sluices and fish pass.

The disused Itchen Navigation runs through the north of the borough, and in the south, Hamble is served by the Hamble-Warsash Ferry.

== Education ==
The local education authority for Eastleigh is Hampshire County Council, which lists 40 schools in the borough. In addition, there are two further education colleges in the town of Eastleigh, and a number of private schools such as the Gregg School in Chartwell Green and King's School in Fair Oak.

== International relationships ==
The Borough of Eastleigh is twinned with:

- Villeneuve-Saint-Georges, France
- Kornwestheim, Germany

has a friendship alliance with:

- Kimry, Russia

and has one Sister City:

- Temple Terrace, Florida, United States

Eastleigh was awarded the European Flag of Honour in 1983 to mark the twentieth anniversary of the Borough's twinning with Villeneuve-Saint-Georges. The flag, which is awarded to local authorities which promote pan-Europe relationships, was presented to the council by a European Commission representative on 18 June 1983.

== Freedom of the Borough ==
The following people and military units have received the Freedom of the Borough of Eastleigh.

=== Individuals ===
- Sir David Price: 1977.
- Godfrey G. Olson: 1977.
- Norman F.N. Norris: 1977.
- Peter A.T. Green: 1977.
- Frank Edward Brown: 1986.
- Dennis A. Tranah: 1986.
- Suzanne Bartlet: 1989.
- George E. Raymond: 1995.
- Margaret Kyrle}: 2003.
- David Chidgey, Baron Chidgey: 2005.
- Christopher Tapp: 2006.
- Doreen Wellfare: 2008.
- Philip Spearey: 21 January 2011.
- David Smith: 2013.
- Dani King: 2013.
- Nirmal Purja: 14 March 2022.

=== Military units ===
- The Royal Hampshire Regiment: September 1991.
- The Princess of Wales's Royal Regiment: 9 September 1992.

== See also ==
- List of places of worship in the Borough of Eastleigh
