= Hound, Hampshire =

Village and parish in Hampshire, England

Coordinates: 50.87°N 1.35°W

Hound
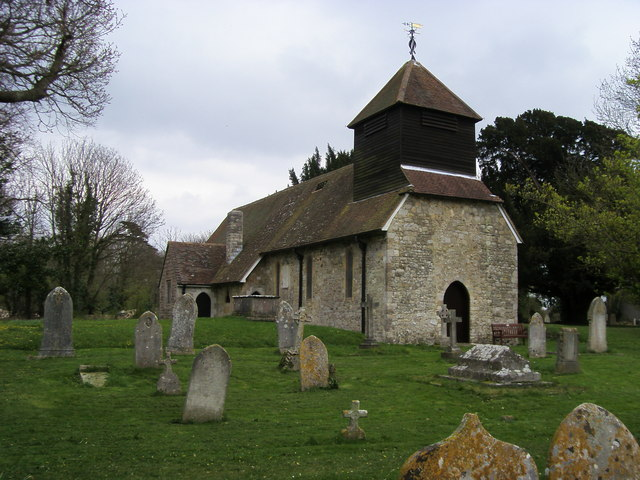
- The Church of St Mary the Virgin

- Location within Hampshire
- Population: 6,846 (2001 Census); 7,105 (2011 Census)
- OS grid reference: SU466089
- Civil parish: Hound
- District: Eastleigh
- Shire county: Hampshire
- Region: South East
- Country: England
- Sovereign state: United Kingdom
- Post town: Southampton
- Postcode district: SO31
- Dialling code: 023
- Police: Hampshire and Isle of Wight
- Fire: Hampshire and Isle of Wight
- Ambulance: South Central
- UK Parliament: Hamble Valley
- Website: Hound Parish Council

Hound is a village and civil parish in the borough of Eastleigh in southern Hampshire, England. The parish encompasses the villages of Netley, Butlocks Heath and Old Netley, and includes such landmarks as Netley Castle and Netley Abbey. In the 2001 census, the parish had a headcount of 6,846 living in 2,928 households.

== History ==
The 1868 National Gazetteer described the parish as being in the Hundred of "Mainsbridge" and containing Sholing and Woolston as well as Netley. The land was mainly arable farmland at this point, with some pasture and woodland, including a substantial amount of common land. The parish has been recorded from about 1370, when John de Bothby, Lord Chancellor of Ireland, held the living of Hound.

The civil parish was previously in South Stoneham Rural District from 1894 until the district disappeared in 1932, and in Winchester RD from then until the present Borough of Eastleigh's formation in 1974.

== Parish church ==
The parish church of St Mary the Virgin is medieval (although a Saxon origin has been suggested) with some Victorian rebuilding. It contains a stained glass window by Patrick Reyntiens. The east window portrays the Virgin and Child flanked by two angels and was designed by Reyntiens in 1958–59. A second Reyntiens stained glass window was added in 1972 this time on the theme of justice and peace.
