= Butlocks Heath =

Village in Hampshire, England

Coordinates: 50.880101°N 1.339822°W

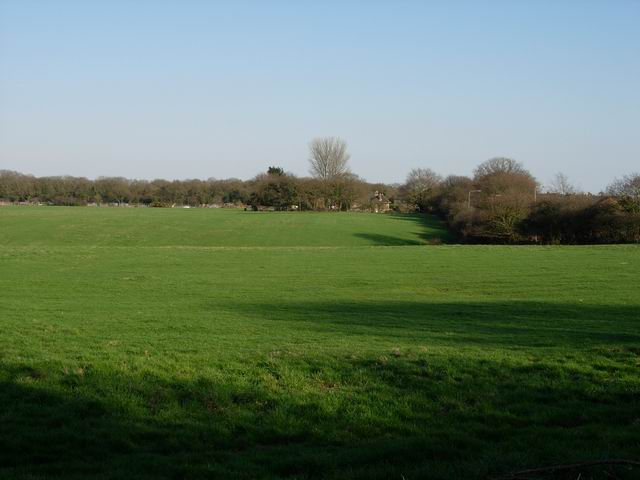

- Location within Hampshire
- Population: 6,846
- District: Eastleigh
- Shire county: Hampshire
- Region: South East
- Country: England
- Sovereign state: United Kingdom
- Post town: SOUTHAMPTON
- Postcode district: SO31
- Dialling code: 023
- Police: Hampshire and Isle of Wight
- Fire: Hampshire and Isle of Wight
- Ambulance: South Central
- UK Parliament: Hamble Valley

Butlocks Heath is a village in the district of Eastleigh in Hampshire, England. The village lies approximately 3.4 miles (5.4 km) south-east from Southampton. It is in the civil parish of Hound, which also includes Netley. Butlocks Heath and Netley are now very close, because of housing growth, though a small area of woodland called The Bunney separates the two villages.

Butlocks Heath is less than a mile outside the city limits of Southampton, and located in the nearby Eastleigh (borough). Woolston Road forms the backbone of the village with roads spurring off it.
