= 2026 Eastleigh Borough Council election =

Local election in Hampshire, England

- 7 May 2026

15 out of 39 seats to Eastleigh Borough Council (including 1 by-election) 20 seats needed for a majority
- Registered: 105,304
- Turnout: 44,967; 42.7%
| | First party | Second party | Third party |
|---|---|---|---|
| Leader | Keith House | Louise Parker-Jones | Steven Broomfield |
| Party | Liberal Democrats | Independent | Conservative |
| Last election | 35 seats, 47.7% | 3 seats, 6.7% | 1 seat, 24.9% |
| Seats before | 33 | 3 | 1 |
| Seats won | 14 | 1 | 0 |
| Seats after | 34 | 3 | 1 |
| Seat change | ▲1 | Steady | Steady |
| Popular vote | 19,740 | 2,601 | 7,274 |
| Percentage | 41.2% | 5.4% | 15.2% |
| Swing | ▼6.5% | ▼1.3% | ▼9.7% |
- Winner of each seat at the 2026 Eastleigh Borough Council election.
Leader before election
Keith House
Liberal Democrats
Leader after election
Keith House
Liberal Democrats

The 2026 Eastleigh Borough Council election was held on 7 May 2026, alongside the other local elections across the United Kingdom being held on the same day, to elect 15 of 39 members of Eastleigh Borough Council across 14 wards in Hampshire, England. Elections for Eastleigh town council were held on the same day.

The Liberal Democrats retained their majority on the council, winning fourteen of the fifteen seats contested at this election.

== Background ==
In 2024, the Liberal Democrats retained control of the council.

=== Council composition ===
| After 2024 election | | Before 2026 election | |
| Party | Seats | Party | Seats |
|---|---|---|---|
| Liberal Democrats | 35 | Liberal Democrats | 33 |
| Independent | 3 | Independent | 3 |
| Conservative | 1 | Conservative | 1 |
| Vacant | 0 | Vacant | 2 |

== Election result ==
2026 Eastleigh Borough Council election
| Party | This election | | | | Full council | | | This election | | |
| Party | Candidates | Seats | Net | Seats % | Other | Total | Total % | Votes | Votes % | +/− |
|---|---|---|---|---|---|---|---|---|---|---|
| Liberal Democrats | {{{candidates}}} | 14 | Steady | 93.3 | 20 | 34 | 87.2 | 19,740 | 41.2 | –6.5 |
| Independent | {{{candidates}}} | 1 | Steady | 6.7 | 2 | 3 | 7.7 | 2,601 | 5.4 | –1.3 |
| Conservative | {{{candidates}}} | 0 | Steady | 0.0 | 1 | 1 | 2.6 | 7,274 | 15.2 | –9.7 |
| Reform | {{{candidates}}} | 0 | Steady | 0.0 | 0 | 0 | 0.0 | 12,092 | 25.2 | +23.8 |
| Green | {{{candidates}}} | 0 | Steady | 0.0 | 0 | 0 | 0.0 | 5,033 | 10.5 | +2.8 |
| Labour | {{{candidates}}} | 0 | Steady | 0.0 | 0 | 0 | 0.0 | 1,158 | 2.4 | –9.2 |
| TUSC | {{{candidates}}} | 0 | Steady | 0.0 | 0 | 0 | 0.0 | 28 | 0.1 | N/A |

== Incumbents ==
| Ward | Incumbent councillor | Party | Re-standing |
|---|---|---|---|
| Bishopstoke | Louise Parker-Jones | Independent | Yes |
| Botley | Rupert Kyrle | Liberal Democrats | Yes |
| Bursledon & Hound North | Tonia Craig | Liberal Democrats | Yes |
| Chandler's Ford | Alan Broadhurst | Liberal Democrats | Yes |
| Eastleigh Central | Cameron Spencer | Liberal Democrats | Yes |
| Eastleigh North | Steve Beer | Liberal Democrats | Yes |
| Eastleigh South | Paul Bicknell | Liberal Democrats | Yes |
| Fair Oak & Horton Heath | Nicholas Couldrey | Liberal Democrats | Yes |
| Hamble & Netley | Prad Bains | Liberal Democrats | Yes |
| Hedge End North | Leigh Hadaway | Liberal Democrats | Yes |
| Hedge End South | John Shepherd | Liberal Democrats | Yes |
| Hiltingbury | Maud Attrill | Liberal Democrats | Yes |
| West End North | Bruce Tennant | Liberal Democrats | Yes |
| West End South | Janice Asman | Liberal Democrats | No |

== Ward results ==
=== Bishopstoke ===
Bishopstoke
| Party | Candidate | Votes | % | ±% |
|---|---|---|---|---|
| Independent | Louise Parker-Jones* | 1,700 | 42.5 | −13.6 |
| Reform | Graeme Smith | 868 | 21.7 | N/A |
| Liberal Democrats | Anne Winstanley | 858 | 21.5 | −2.7 |
| Conservative | Sarah Duggan | 292 | 7.3 | −2.6 |
| Green | Dani Hosford | 278 | 7.0 | N/A |
| Majority | | 832 | 20.8 | –11.1 |
| Turnout | | 4,003 | 48.2 | +12.4 |
| Registered electors | | 8,298 | | |
| Independent hold | | | | |

=== Botley ===
Botley
| Party | Candidate | Votes | % | ±% |
|---|---|---|---|---|
| Liberal Democrats | Rupert Kyrle | 1,378 | 46.4 | −16.7 |
| Reform | Dave Cox | 754 | 25.4 | N/A |
| Conservative | Finn Lennon | 549 | 18.5 | −7.9 |
| Green | Luke Ottley | 286 | 9.6 | −0.8 |
| Majority | | 624 | 21.0 | –15.7 |
| Turnout | | 2,980 | 43.5 | +12.9 |
| Registered electors | | 6,853 | | |
| Liberal Democrats hold | | | | |

=== Bursledon & Hound North ===
Bursledon & Hound North
| Party | Candidate | Votes | % | ±% |
|---|---|---|---|---|
| Liberal Democrats | Tonia Craig* | 1,378 | 46.8 | −20.7 |
| Reform | Craig Palmer | 831 | 28.2 | N/A |
| Conservative | Carys Chestnut | 438 | 14.9 | −4.4 |
| Green | Keith Day | 272 | 9.2 | +4.1 |
| TUSC | Frankie Coultas | 28 | 1.0 | N/A |
| Majority | | 547 | 18.6 | –29.6 |
| Turnout | | 2,961 | 38.2 | +11.9 |
| Registered electors | | 7,756 | | |
| Liberal Democrats hold | | | | |

=== Chandler's Ford ===
Chandler's Ford (2 seats due to by-election)
| Party | Candidate | Votes | % | ±% |
|---|---|---|---|---|
| Liberal Democrats | Alan Broadhurst* | 1,846 | 49.6 | +3.7 |
| Liberal Democrats | Dave Walker | 1,490 | 40.1 | –6.7 |
| Reform | Nigel Murkitt | 830 | 22.3 | N/A |
| Reform | Roy Swales | 695 | 18.7 | N/A |
| Conservative | Paul Bryant | 557 | 15.0 | –15.5 |
| Conservative | Albie Slawson | 532 | 14.3 | –16.3 |
| Green | Bors Hulesch | 403 | 10.8 | +3.3 |
| Green | Daniel Jones | 339 | 9.1 | +1.4 |
| Labour | Christopher Gibbs | 163 | 4.4 | –4.8 |
| Turnout | | 3,738 | 46.0 | +10.5 |
| Registered electors | | 8,117 | | |
| Liberal Democrats hold | | | | |
| Liberal Democrats hold | | | | |

Chandler's Ford elected two councillors because the ward had a casual vacancy.

=== Eastleigh Central ===
Eastleigh Central
| Party | Candidate | Votes | % | ±% |
|---|---|---|---|---|
| Liberal Democrats | Cameron Spencer* | 1,098 | 40.2 | −6.5 |
| Reform | Sukhdev Raj | 704 | 25.7 | −2.2 |
| Green | Toby Cain | 485 | 17.7 | N/A |
| Conservative | Poonam Sharma | 257 | 9.4 | +2.6 |
| Labour | Zak Southward | 190 | 6.9 | −7.6 |
| Majority | | 394 | 14.4 | +10.5 |
| Turnout | | 2,749 | 36.2 | +5.2 |
| Registered electors | | 7,595 | | |
| Liberal Democrats hold | | Swing | ▼2.2 | |

=== Eastleigh North ===
Eastleigh North
| Party | Candidate | Votes | % | ±% |
|---|---|---|---|---|
| Liberal Democrats | Stephen Beer* | 1,180 | 41.6 | −4.0 |
| Reform | Alex Culley | 824 | 29.0 | N/A |
| Green | Jack Stapleton | 345 | 12.2 | +0.5 |
| Conservative | Jeremy Over | 319 | 11.2 | −13.0 |
| Labour | Kathy O'Neill | 169 | 6.0 | −12.5 |
| Majority | | 356 | 12.5 | –8.8 |
| Turnout | | 2,850 | 39.4 | +10.3 |
| Registered electors | | 7,236 | | |
| Liberal Democrats hold | | | | |

=== Eastleigh South ===
Eastleigh South
| Party | Candidate | Votes | % | ±% |
|---|---|---|---|---|
| Liberal Democrats | Paul Bicknell* | 1,161 | 40.5 | −6.0 |
| Reform | Clare Fawcett | 870 | 30.4 | +18.7 |
| Green | Jim Smith | 414 | 14.4 | +5.4 |
| Conservative | Yogesh Saxena | 266 | 9.3 | −3.1 |
| Labour | Steven Phillips | 155 | 5.4 | −15.0 |
| Majority | | 291 | 10.2 | –16.0 |
| Turnout | | 2,881 | 33.4 | +7.4 |
| Registered electors | | 8,632 | | |
| Liberal Democrats hold | | Swing | ▼12.3 | |

=== Fair Oak & Horton Heath ===
Fair Oak & Horton Heath
| Party | Candidate | Votes | % | ±% |
|---|---|---|---|---|
| Liberal Democrats | Nick Couldrey* | 1,048 | 25.2 | −7.4 |
| Reform | Austen Petty | 914 | 22.0 | N/A |
| Conservative | Ben Burcombe-Filer | 801 | 19.3 | −29.2 |
| Independent | Russ Kitching | 458 | 11.0 | N/A |
| Independent | Richard Shuker | 443 | 10.7 | N/A |
| Green | Ben Parry | 396 | 9.5 | −1.0 |
| Labour | William Banks | 93 | 2.2 | −6.1 |
| Majority | | 134 | 3.2 | N/A |
| Turnout | | 4,165 | 47.1 | +11.4 |
| Registered electors | | 8,849 | | |
| Liberal Democrats hold | | | | |

=== Hamble & Netley ===
Hamble & Netley
| Party | Candidate | Votes | % | ±% |
|---|---|---|---|---|
| Liberal Democrats | Prad Bains* | 1,572 | 43.6 | −8.5 |
| Reform | Neil Fleming | 1,059 | 29.4 | N/A |
| Conservative | Steph Arnold | 504 | 14.0 | −3.9 |
| Green | Philip Horton | 342 | 9.5 | N/A |
| Labour | Dennis Robinson | 131 | 3.6 | −3.3 |
| Majority | | 513 | 14.2 | –29.7 |
| Turnout | | 3,613 | 44.6 | +11.1 |
| Registered electors | | 8,095 | | |
| Liberal Democrats hold | | | | |

=== Hedge End North ===
Hedge End North
| Party | Candidate | Votes | % | ±% |
|---|---|---|---|---|
| Liberal Democrats | Leigh Hadaway* | 1,298 | 44.6 | −11.4 |
| Reform | James Flaxman | 685 | 23.5 | N/A |
| Conservative | Nick Arnold | 484 | 16.6 | −3.3 |
| Green | Geoffrey Skinner | 343 | 11.8 | +2.4 |
| Labour | Edward Hill | 101 | 3.5 | −11.2 |
| Majority | | 613 | 21.1 | –15.0 |
| Turnout | | 2,919 | 39.5 | +12.9 |
| Registered electors | | 7,396 | | |
| Liberal Democrats hold | | | | |

=== Hedge End South ===
Hedge End South
| Party | Candidate | Votes | % | ±% |
|---|---|---|---|---|
| Liberal Democrats | John Shepherd* | 1,634 | 43.4 | −9.7 |
| Reform | Anthony Savage | 1,016 | 27.0 | N/A |
| Conservative | Jerry Hall | 788 | 20.9 | −8.7 |
| Green | Anna Skinner | 331 | 8.8 | +2.4 |
| Majority | | 618 | 16.4 | –7.1 |
| Turnout | | 3,781 | 43.9 | +11.8 |
| Registered electors | | 8,622 | | |
| Liberal Democrats hold | | | | |

=== Hiltingbury ===
Hiltingbury
| Party | Candidate | Votes | % | ±% |
|---|---|---|---|---|
| Liberal Democrats | Maud Attrill* | 2,092 | 49.8 | −2.0 |
| Conservative | Shelagh Lee | 808 | 19.2 | −15.8 |
| Reform | Michael Hibberd | 756 | 18.0 | N/A |
| Green | Oliver Smith | 442 | 10.5 | +2.0 |
| Labour | Hannah Bowyer | 100 | 2.4 | −2.4 |
| Majority | | 1,284 | 30.6 | +13.8 |
| Turnout | | 4,220 | 51.1 | +8.2 |
| Registered electors | | 8,255 | | |
| Liberal Democrats hold | | Swing | ▲6.9 | |

=== West End North ===
West End North
| Party | Candidate | Votes | % | ±% |
|---|---|---|---|---|
| Liberal Democrats | Bruce Tennent* | 795 | 40.4 | −16.5 |
| Reform | Roy Russell | 645 | 32.8 | N/A |
| Conservative | Colin Gifford | 319 | 16.2 | −10.5 |
| Green | Elaine Avery | 154 | 7.8 | −1.3 |
| Labour | Christian Brookes | 56 | 2.8 | −3.7 |
| Majority | | 150 | 7.6 | –22.6 |
| Turnout | | 1,977 | 41.6 | +9.5 |
| Registered electors | | 4,749 | | |
| Liberal Democrats hold | | | | |

=== West End South ===
West End South
| Party | Candidate | Votes | % | ±% |
|---|---|---|---|---|
| Liberal Democrats | David Berry | 912 | 43.1 | −11.2 |
| Reform | Steve Humby | 641 | 30.3 | N/A |
| Conservative | Roger Vivian | 360 | 17.0 | −13.5 |
| Green | Dave Waghorn | 203 | 9.6 | +3.3 |
| Majority | | 271 | 12.8 | –11.0 |
| Turnout | | 2,130 | 43.9 | +10.4 |
| Registered electors | | 4,851 | | |
| Liberal Democrats hold | | | | |

== Changes 2026–2027 ==
=== By-elections ===
==== Hedge End South ====
The by-election was triggered by the death of Liberal Democrat councillor Cynthia Garton on 2 May 2026.

Hedge End South by-election, 30 July 2026
| Party | Candidate | Votes | % | ±% |
|---|---|---|---|---|
| Liberal Democrats | Jim Paine | 1,086 | 46.1 | +2.7 |
| Conservative | Jerry Hall | 589 | 25.0 | +4.1 |
| Reform | Neil Fleming | 443 | 18.8 | −8.2 |
| Green | Keith Day | 199 | 8.4 | −0.3 |
| Labour | Will Banks | 41 | 1.7 | N/A |
| Majority | | 497 | 21.1 | N/A |
| Turnout | | 2,360 | 27.4 | −16.5 |
| Registered electors | | 8,605 | | |
| Liberal Democrats hold | | Swing | | |

The Liberal Democrat hold restored the party to 35 of the council's 39 seats.
