= Borough =

Administrative division in some English-speaking countries

A borough is an administrative division in various English-speaking countries. In principle, the term borough designates a self-governing walled town, although in practice, official use of the term varies widely. A borough is usually smaller than a city.

== History ==
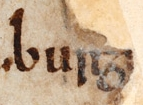
A burg (at the time spelled using the insular G) in the Beowulf

In the Middle Ages, boroughs were settlements in England that were granted some self-government; burghs were the Scottish equivalent. In medieval England, boroughs were also entitled to elect members of parliament. The use of the word borough probably derives from the burghal system of Alfred the Great. Alfred set up a system of defensive strong points (burhs); in order to maintain these particular settlements, he granted them a degree of autonomy. After the Norman Conquest, when certain towns were granted self-governance, the concept of the burh/borough seems to have been reused to mean a self-governing settlement.

The concept of the borough has been used repeatedly (and often differently) throughout the world. Often, a borough is a single town with its own local government. However, in some cities it is a subdivision of the city (for example, New York City, London, and Montreal). In such cases, the borough will normally have either limited powers delegated to it by the city's local government, or no powers at all. In other places, such as the U.S. state of Alaska, borough designates a whole region; Alaska's largest borough, the North Slope Borough, is comparable in area to the entire United Kingdom, although its population is less than that of Swanage on England's south coast with around 9,600 inhabitants. In Australia, a borough was once a self-governing small town, but this designation has all but vanished, except for the only remaining borough in the country, which is the Borough of Queenscliffe.

Boroughs as administrative units are to be found in Ireland and the United Kingdom, more specifically in England and Northern Ireland. Boroughs also exist in the Canadian province of Quebec and formerly in Ontario, in some states of the United States, in Israel, formerly in New Zealand and only one left in Australia.

== Etymology ==
The word borough derives from the Old English word burg, burh, meaning a fortified settlement; the word appears as modern English bury, -brough, Scots burgh, borg in Scandinavian languages, -bert in Dutch and Burg in German.

A number of other European languages have cognate words that were borrowed from the Germanic languages during the Middle Ages, including brog in Irish, bwr or bwrc, meaning "wall, rampart" in Welsh, bourg in French, burg in Catalan (in Catalonia there is a town named Burg), borgo in Italian, burgo in Portuguese, Galician, and Castilian/Spanish. It has often been preserved in non-Germanic place names, hence the Castilian place name Burgos, Galician place names O Burgo and Malburgo, the -bork of Lębork and Malbork in Polish, and the -bor of Maribor in Slovenian.

The 'burg' element, which means "castle" or "fortress", is often confused with 'berg' meaning "hill" or "mountain" (cf. iceberg, inselberg). Hence the 'berg' element in Bergen or Heidelberg relates to a hill, rather than a fort. In some cases, the 'berg' element in place names has converged towards burg/borough; for instance Farnborough, from fernaberga (fern-hill).

A quite distinct word borough, a variant of borgh or borow, was sometimes used historically in south-east England (the county of Kent, and parts of Surrey and Sussex), to mean what was elsewhere called a tithing, a subdivision of a manor or civil parish. The head of such a unit might be known as a headborough. This usage is not to be confused with the more widespread meaning of borough as a privileged town.

== Definitions ==
=== Australia ===
In Australia, the term "borough" is an occasionally used term for a local government area. Currently there is only one borough in Australia, the Borough of Queenscliffe in Victoria, although there have been more in the past. However, in some cases it can be integrated into the council's name instead of used as an official title, such as the Kingborough Council in Tasmania.

=== Canada ===
In Quebec, the term "borough" is generally used as the English translation of arrondissement, referring to an administrative division of a municipality, or a district. Eight municipalities are divided into boroughs: See List of boroughs in Quebec.

In Ontario, it was previously used to denote suburban municipalities in Metropolitan Toronto, including Scarborough, York, North York and Etobicoke prior to their conversions to cities. The Borough of East York was the last Toronto municipality to hold this status, relinquishing it upon becoming part of the City of Toronto government on January 1, 1998.

=== Colombia ===
The Colombian municipalities are subdivided into boroughs (English translation of the Spanish term localidades) with a local executive and an administrative board for local government. These boroughs are divided into neighborhoods.

=== Ireland ===
There are four borough districts designated by the Local Government Reform Act 2014: Clonmel, Drogheda, Sligo, and Wexford. A local boundary review reporting in 2018 proposed granting borough status to any district containing a census town with a population over 30,000; this would have included the towns of Dundalk, Bray, and Navan. This would have required an amendment to the 2014 Act, promised for 2019 by minister John Paul Phelan.

Historically, there were 117 parliamentary boroughs in the Irish House of Commons, of which 80 were disfranchised by the Acts of Union 1800. All but 11 municipal boroughs were abolished under the Municipal Corporations (Ireland) Act 1840. Under the Local Government (Ireland) Act 1898, six of these became county boroughs: Dublin, Belfast, Cork, Derry, Limerick and Waterford. From 1921, Belfast and Derry were part of Northern Ireland and stayed within the United Kingdom on the establishment of the Irish Free State in 1922.

Galway was a borough from 1937 until upgraded to a county borough in 1985. The county boroughs in the Republic of Ireland were redesignated as "cities" under the Local Government Act 2001.

Dún Laoghaire was a borough from 1930 until merged into Dún Laoghaire–Rathdown county in 1994.

There were five borough councils in place at the time of the Local Government Reform Act 2014 which abolished all second-tier local government units of borough and town councils. Each local government authority outside of Dublin, Cork City and Galway City was divided into areas termed municipal districts. In four of the areas which had previously been contained borough councils, as listed above, these were instead termed Borough Districts. Kilkenny had previously had a borough council, but its district was to be called the Municipal District of Kilkenny City, in recognition of its historic city status.

=== Israel ===
Under Israeli law, inherited from British Mandate municipal law, the possibility of creating a municipal borough exists. However, no borough was actually created under law until 2005–2006, when Neve Monosson and Maccabim-Re'ut, both communal settlements (Heb: yishuv kehilati) founded in 1953 and 1984, respectively, were declared to be autonomous municipal boroughs (Heb: vaad rova ironi), within their mergers with the towns of Yehud and Modi'in. Similar structures have been created under different types of legal status over the years in Israel, notably Kiryat Haim in Haifa, Jaffa in Tel Aviv-Yafo and Ramot and Gilo in Jerusalem. However, Neve Monosson is the first example of a full municipal borough actually declared under law by the Minister of the Interior, under a model subsequently adopted in Maccabim-Re'ut as well.

=== Mexico ===
In Mexico as translations from English to Spanish applied to Mexico City, the word borough has resulted in a delegación (delegation), referring to the 16 administrative areas within Mexico City, now called alcaldías.

=== New Zealand ===
New Zealand formerly used the term borough to designate self-governing towns of more than 1,000 people, although 19th century census records show many boroughs with populations as low as 200. A borough of more than 20,000 people could become a city by proclamation. Boroughs and cities were collectively known as municipalities, and were enclaves separate from their surrounding counties. Boroughs proliferated in the suburban areas of the larger cities: By the 1980s there were 19 boroughs and three cities in the area that is now the City of Auckland.

In the 1980s, some boroughs and cities began to be merged with their surrounding counties to form districts with a mixed urban and rural population. A nationwide reform of local government in 1989 completed the process. Counties and boroughs were abolished and all boundaries were redrawn. Under the new system, most territorial authorities cover both urban and rural land. The more populated councils are classified as cities, and the more rural councils are classified as districts. Only Kawerau District, an enclave within Whakatāne District, continues to follow the tradition of a small town council that does not include surrounding rural area.

=== Trinidad and Tobago ===
In Trinidad and Tobago, a borough is a unit of local government. There are five boroughs in The Republic of Trinidad and Tobago:

- Chaguanas
- Arima
- Point Fortin
- Diego Martin
- Siparia

=== United Kingdom ===
==== England and Wales ====
===== Ancient and municipal boroughs =====
During the medieval period many towns were granted self-governance by the Crown, at which point they became referred to as boroughs. The formal status of borough came to be conferred by Royal Charter. These boroughs were generally governed by a self-selecting corporation (i.e., when a member died or resigned his replacement would be by co-option). Sometimes boroughs were governed by bailiffs.

Debates on the Reform Bill (eventually the Reform Act 1832) lamented the diversity of polity of such town corporations, and a Royal Commission was set up to investigate this. This resulted in a regularisation of municipal government by the Municipal Corporations Act 1835. 178 of the ancient boroughs were re-formed as municipal boroughs, with all municipal corporations to be elected according to a standard franchise based on property ownership. The unreformed boroughs lapsed in borough status, or were reformed (or abolished) later. Several new municipal boroughs were formed in the new industrial cities after the bill enacted, per its provisions.

As part of a large-scale reform of local government in England and Wales in 1974, municipal boroughs were finally abolished (having become increasingly irrelevant). However, the civic traditions of many were continued by the grant of a charter to their successor district councils. As to smallest boroughs, a town council was formed for an alike zone, while charter trustees were formed for a few others. A successor body is allowed to use the regalia of the old corporation, and appoint ceremonial office holders such as sword and mace bearers as provided in their original charters. The council, or trustees, may apply for an Order in Council or Royal Licence to use the coat of arms.

===== Parliamentary boroughs =====
From 1265, two burgesses from each borough were summoned to the Parliament of England, alongside two knights from each county. Thus parliamentary constituencies were derived from the ancient boroughs. Representation in the House of Commons was decided by the House itself, which resulted in boroughs being established in some small settlements for the purposes of parliamentary representation, despite their possessing no actual corporation.

After the Reform Act 1832, which disenfranchised many of the rotten boroughs (boroughs that had declined in importance, had only a small population, and had only a handful of eligible voters), parliamentary constituencies began to diverge from the ancient boroughs. While many ancient boroughs remained as municipal boroughs, they were disenfranchised by the Reform Act.

===== County boroughs =====
The Local Government Act 1888 established a new sort of borough – the county borough. These were designed to be 'counties-to-themselves'; administrative divisions to sit alongside the new administrative counties. They allowed urban areas to be administered separately from the more rural areas. They, therefore, often contained pre-existing municipal boroughs, which thereafter became part of the second tier of local government, below the administrative counties and county boroughs.

The county boroughs were, like the municipal boroughs, abolished in 1974, being reabsorbed into their parent counties for administrative purposes.

===== Metropolitan boroughs =====
In 1899, as part of a reform of local government in the County of London, the various parishes in London were reorganised as new entities, the 'metropolitan boroughs'. These were reorganised further when Greater London was formed out of Middlesex, parts of Surrey, Kent, Essex, Hertfordshire and the County of London in 1965. These council areas are now referred to as "London boroughs" rather than "metropolitan boroughs".

When the new metropolitan counties (Greater Manchester, Merseyside, South Yorkshire, Tyne and Wear, West Midlands, and West Yorkshire) were created in 1974, their sub-divisions also became metropolitan boroughs in many, but not all, cases; in many cases these metropolitan boroughs recapitulated abolished county boroughs (for example, Stockport). The metropolitan boroughs possessed slightly more autonomy from the metropolitan county councils than the shire county districts did from their county councils.

With the abolition of the metropolitan county councils in 1986, these metropolitan boroughs became independent, and continue to be so at present.

===== Other current uses =====
Elsewhere in England a number of districts and unitary authority areas are called "borough". Until 1974, this was a status that denoted towns with a certain type of local government (a municipal corporation, or a self-governing body). Since 1974, it has been a purely ceremonial style granted by royal charter to districts which may consist of a single town or may include a number of towns or rural areas. Borough status entitles the council chairman to bear the title of mayor. Districts may apply to the British Crown for the grant of borough status upon advice of the Privy Council of the United Kingdom.

==== Northern Ireland ====
In Northern Ireland, local government was reorganised in 1973. Under the legislation that created the 26 districts of Northern Ireland, a district council whose area included an existing municipal borough could resolve to adopt the charter of the old municipality and thus continue to enjoy borough status. Districts that do not contain a former borough can apply for a charter in a similar manner to English districts.

=== United States ===
In the United States, a borough is a unit of local government or other administrative division below the level of the state. The term is currently used in six states.

The following states use, or have used, the word with the following meanings:

- Alaska, as a county-equivalent — List of boroughs and census areas in Alaska
- Connecticut, as an incorporated municipality within, or consolidated with, a town — see Borough (Connecticut)
- Michigan, formerly applied to a village in the midst of forming a city. Also in Michigan is Mackinac Island, which was a borough from 1817 to 1847, when it became a village; it has been a city since 1899.
- New Jersey, as a type of independent incorporated municipality — see Borough (New Jersey)
- New York, as one of the five divisions of New York City, each coextensive with a county — see Boroughs of New York City
- Pennsylvania, as a type of municipality comparable to a town — see Borough (Pennsylvania) — though two of the state's largest cities, Pittsburgh and Harrisburg, have retained their names despite clearly being cities, as well as smaller communities that are officially cities in the Commonwealth such as Gettysburg
- Virginia, as a division of a city under certain circumstances — see Administrative divisions of Virginia § Boroughs
- Wisconsin in the 19th century occasionally used the term "borough" for the type of civil township normally known as a town.

== See also ==
- Ancient borough
- Borough status in the United Kingdom
- Boroughs incorporated in England and Wales 1835–1882 and 1882–1974
- Boroughs of New York City
- Borough-English, a form of inheritance associated with the English boroughs
- Burgh and List of burghs in Scotland
- County borough
- History of local government in England
- Metropolitan borough
- Municipal borough
