= The Point, Eastleigh =

Municipal building in Eastleigh, Hampshire, England

The Point
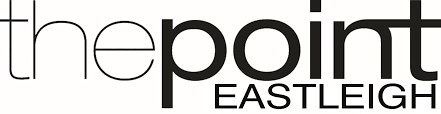

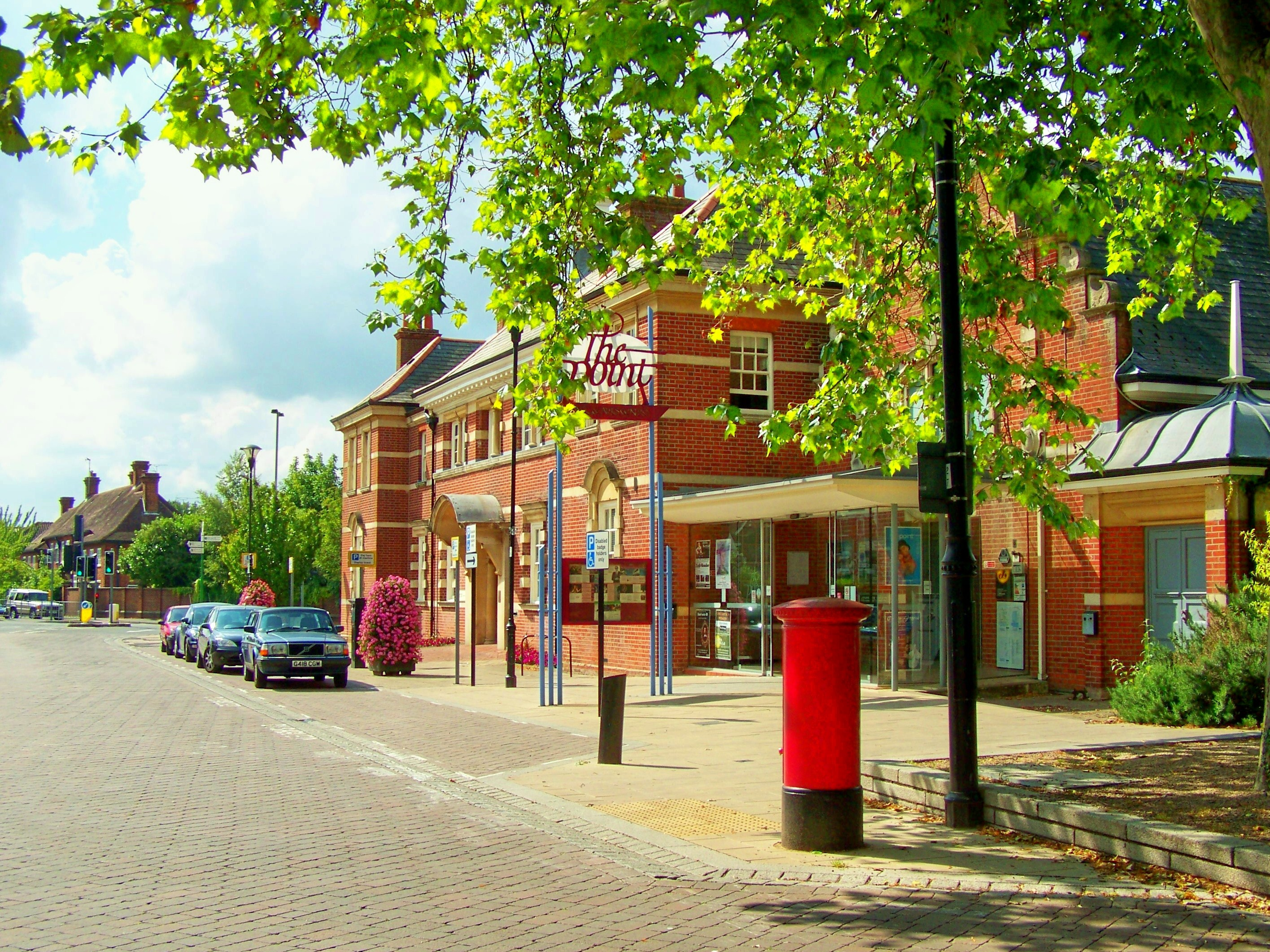
- Interactive map of The Point
- Location: Eastleigh, Hampshire
- Coordinates: 50.970431°N 1.355527°W
- Operator: Eastleigh Borough Council
- Capacity: 312
- Public transit: Eastleigh Bus Station

Construction
- Opened: 1899 (converted into a theatre in 1997)
- Architects: Mitchell, Son and Gutteridge
- Builder: J. Treherne

Website
- www.thepointeastleigh.co.uk

The Point is a theatre and dance studio for contemporary performance and contemporary dance at Eastleigh in Hampshire, England, operating under the auspices of Eastleigh Borough Council. It was previously the local council offices and then the local town hall for Eastleigh before being converted into a theatre in 1997.

== History ==
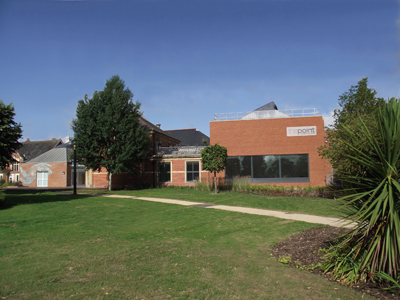
Phase 3

After significant industrial growth in the late 19th century, particularly after the railway carriage building facility, Eastleigh Works, was established in the town in 1891, the area became an urban district in 1899. In anticipation of this civic leaders decided to procure civic offices: the site chosen was open land at the corner of Leigh Road and Romsey Road.

Following a design competition with 36 entries, Mitchell, Son and Gutteridge of Southampton was selected as the architect. The foundation stone for the new building was laid by the mayor, Councillor H. T. Willmer, in 1898. It was designed in the Victorian style, built in red brick with stone dressings by J. Treherne at a cost of £4,500 and completed in 1899. The design involved a symmetrical main frontage with seven bays facing onto Leigh Road with the end bays slightly projected forward as pavilions; the central section featured a doorway flanked by Doric order columns supporting an entablature with a segmental hood which projected forward and there was a clock turret at roof level. The second phase of construction was a concert hall, which was erected to the east of the original building, in 1928.

The building became the town hall for the new municipal borough of Eastleigh in 1936 but ceased to be the local seat of government after new civic offices were completed further west along on Leigh Road in 1974.

In 1935, a Carnegie library was opened immediately adjacent to the town hall. Built in red brick and in a complementary style, the architect was F. G. Lee. The library relocated to the Swan Centre in the early 1990s.

Following a successful application for support from the Heritage Lottery Fund, the buildings were converted into a theatre known as The Point in 1997.

A new 375-square-metre (4,036-square-foot) studio space and accommodation area, built at a cost of £2.5 million and known as the Creation Space, was inaugurated by the dancer, Akram Khan, in November 2009. The Point's sister venue, the Berry Theatre, was opened in Hedge End by the actor and director, Samuel West, in April 2011.

The Point hosted the BBC's topical debate programme, Question Time, on 22 January 2015. Guests included the Liberal-Democrats' Foreign Affairs spokesman, Tim Farron, the Deputy Leader of UKIP, Paul Nuttall, and the candidate for mayor of London, Diane Abbott. The Point's foyer and café bar were refurbished later in 2015 and the venue launched a fund raising project in 2019.

== Activities ==
The Point presents a year-round programme of theatre, 35mm film (non digital projection), light entertainment and contemporary dance performance. Every summer, The Point runs a free outdoor festival known as Eastleigh Unwrapped, and it also operates a summer social season which markets its activities to local residents.
