= Boroughs incorporated in England and Wales 1882–1974 =

The following is a list of towns in England and Wales which were granted charters of incorporation conferring borough status under the Municipal Corporations Act 1882 or the Local Government Act 1933.

== 1882–89 ==
Forty-four boroughs were incorporated in this period. Of this number, more than half (twenty-five) were unreformed boroughs listed in the schedule to the Municipal Corporations Act 1883. This act abolished all such boroughs unless they obtained a new charter by 1886. Among the remaining 20 boroughs most were industrial centres or resorts. Also incorporated was Chelmsford, county town of Essex, and two areas of suburban London, Croydon and West Ham.

Municipal Borough	County	Created	Abolished	Successor(s)
Bacup MB	Lancashire	1882	1974	Rossendale
Keighley MB	Yorkshire (1882–89), West Riding of Yorkshire (1889-1974)	1882	1974	Bradford
West Bromwich MB	Staffordshire	1882	1889	West Bromwich CB
Bangor MB†	Caernarfonshire	1883	1974	Arfon
Croydon MB	Surrey	1883	1889	Croydon CB
Eastbourne MB	Sussex (1883–89), East Sussex (1889-1911)	1883	1911	Eastbourne CB
Henley-on-Thames MB	Oxfordshire	1883	1974	South Oxfordshire
Workington MB	Cumberland	1883	1974	Allerdale
Harrogate MB	Yorkshire (1884–89), West Riding of Yorkshire (1889-1974)	1884	1974	Harrogate
Lampeter MB†	Cardiganshire	1884	1974	Ceredigion
Ramsgate MB	Kent	1884	1974	Thanet
Aldeburgh MB†	Suffolk (1884–89), East Suffolk (1889-1974)	1884	1974	Suffolk Coastal
Appleby MB†	Westmorland	1885	1974	Eden
Bishop's Castle MB	Shropshire	1885	1967	absorbed by Clun RD (Rural Borough)
Kidwelly MB†	Carmarthenshire	1885	1974	Llanelli
Llanfyllin MB†	Montgomeryshire	1885	1974	Montgomery
Lostwithiel MB†	Cornwall	1885	1967	absorbed by St Austell RD (Rural Borough)
Lowestoft MB	Suffolk (1885–89), East Suffolk (1889-1974)	1885	1974	Waveney
Lydd MB†	Kent	1885	1974	Shepway
Montgomery MB†	Montgomeryshire	1885	1974	Montgomery
Morley MB	Yorkshire (1885–89), West Riding of Yorkshire (1889-1974)	1885	1974	Leeds
Mossley MB	Lancashire, Cheshire and Yorkshire (1885–89), Lancashire (1889-1974)	1885	1974	Tameside
New Romney MB†	Kent	1885	1974	Shepway
Okehampton MB†	Devon	1885	1974	West Devon
Queenborough MB†	Kent	1885	1968	Queenborough-in-Sheppey MB
Saltash MB†	Cornwall	1885	1974	Caradon
Sutton Coldfield MB (Royal Town)†	Warwickshire	1885	1974	Birmingham
Wilton MB†	Wiltshire	1885	1974	Salisbury
Wokingham MB†	Berkshire	1885	1974	Wokingham
Brackley MB†	Northamptonshire	1886	1974	South Northamptonshire
Christchurch MB†	Hampshire	1886	1974	Christchurch
Higham Ferrers MB†	Northamptonshire	1886	1974	East Northamptonshire
Malmesbury MB†	Wiltshire	1886	1974	North Wiltshire
Middleton MB	Lancashire	1886	1974	Rochdale
Wareham MB†	Dorset	1886	1974	Purbeck
Wednesbury MB	Staffordshire	1886	1966	absorbed by Walsall CB and West Bromwich CB
West Ham MB	Essex	1886	1889	West Ham CB
Woodstock MB†	Oxfordshire	1886	1974	West Oxfordshire
Cowbridge MB	Glamorganshire	1887	1974	Vale of Glamorgan
Ilkeston MB	Derbyshire	1887	1974	Erewash
West Hartlepool MB	County Durham	1887	1902	West Hartlepool CB
Chelmsford MB	Essex	1888	1974	Chelmsford
Loughborough MB	Leicestershire	1888	1974	Charnwood
Tunbridge Wells MB (1889-1909), Royal Tunbridge Wells MB (1909-1974)	Kent	1889	1974	Tunbridge Wells

† Listed in the schedule of the Municipal Corporations Act 1883.

== 1890–99 ==
Twenty-five boroughs were incorporated in 1890s.

Municipal Borough	County	Created	Abolished	Successor(s)
Bournemouth MB	Hampshire	1890	1900	Bournemouth CB
Chatham MB	Kent	1890	1974	Rochester-upon-Medway
Nelson MB	Lancashire	1890	1974	Pendle
Ossett MB	West Riding of Yorkshire	1890	1974	Wakefield
Richmond MB	Surrey	1890	1965	Richmond upon Thames
Worthing MB	West Sussex	1890	1974	Worthing
Haslingden MB	Lancashire	1891	1974	Rossendale
Mansfield MB	Nottinghamshire	1891	1974	Mansfield
Rawtenstall MB	Lancashire	1891	1974	Rossendale
Eccles MB	Lancashire	1892	1974	Salford
Southend-on-Sea MB	Essex	1892	1914	Southend-on-Sea CB
Thornaby-on-Tees MB	North Riding of Yorkshire	1892	1968	Teesside CB
Torquay MB	Devon	1892	1967	Torbay CB
Widnes MB	Lancashire	1892	1974	Halton
Brighouse MB	West Riding of Yorkshire	1893	1974	Calderdale
Whitehaven MB	Cumberland	1894	1974	Copeland
Colne MB	Lancashire	1895	1974	Pendle
Todmorden MB	West Riding of Yorkshire	1896	1974	Calderdale
Hemel Hempstead MB	Hertfordshire	1898	1974	Dacorum
Hove MB	East Sussex	1898	1974	Hove
Abergavenny MB	Monmouthshire	1899	1974	Monmouth
Bridlington MB	East Riding of Yorkshire	1899	1974	North Wolds
Dukinfield MB	Cheshire	1899	1974	Tameside
Leigh MB	Lancashire	1899	1974	Wigan
Smethwick MB	Staffordshire	1899	1907	Smethwick CB

== 1900–09 ==
There were 14 incorporations in the years 1900–1909. 1900 also saw the creation of 28 Metropolitan Boroughs in the County of London by the London Government Act 1899.

Municipal Borough	County	Created	Abolished	Successor(s)
Pudsey MB	West Riding of Yorkshire	1900	1974	Leeds
Swindon MB	Wiltshire	1900	1974	Thamesdown
Ealing MB	Middlesex	1901	1965	Ealing
Wallsend MB	Northumberland	1901	1974	North Tyneside
Bexhill MB	East Sussex	1902	1974	Rother
Morecambe MB (1902–28), Morecambe and Heysham MB (1928-74)	Lancashire	1902	1974	Lancaster
Aston Manor MB	Warwickshire	1903	1911	absorbed by Birmingham CB
Bromley MB	Kent	1903	1965	Bromley
Gillingham MB	Kent	1903	1974	Gillingham
Hornsey MB	Middlesex	1903	1965	Haringey
East Ham MB	Essex	1904	1915	East Ham CB
Merthyr Tydfil MB	Glamorganshire	1905	1908	Merthyr Tydfil CB
Wimbledon MB	Surrey	1905	1965	Merton
Nuneaton MB	Warwickshire	1907	1974	Nuneaton

== 1910–19 ==
There were only seven incorporations in this period. In fact, the number of boroughs only increased by one, as six boroughs were abolished. Stoke-on-Trent was an amalgam of four boroughs: Burslem, Hanley, Longton and Stoke upon Trent (and two urban districts); Aston Manor was absorbed by Birmingham in 1911; and Devonport by Plymouth in 1914.

Municipal Borough	County	Created	Abolished	Successor(s)
Wallasey MB	Cheshire	1910	1913	Wallasey CB
Fowey MB	Cornwall	1913	1968	St Austell with Fowey MB
Llanelly MB (1913–66), Llanelli MB (1966-74)	Carmarthenshire	1913	1974	Llanelli
Stourbridge MB	Worcestershire	1914	1974	Dudley
Aylesbury MB	Buckinghamshire	1917	1974	Aylesbury Vale
Buxton MB	Derbyshire	1917	1974	High Peak

== 1920–29 ==
Eleven boroughs were incorporated in the 1920s. This only represented a net increase of ten, however as Port Talbot was formed from the merger of the borough of Aberavon and the urban district of Margam.

Municipal Borough	County	Created	Abolished	Successor(s)
Acton MB	Middlesex	1921	1965	Ealing
Port Talbot MB	Glamorganshire	1921	1974	Afan
Redcar MB	North Riding of Yorkshire	1921	1968	Teesside CB
Aldershot MB	Hampshire	1922	1974	Rushmoor
Blyth MB	Northumberland	1922	1974	Blyth Valley
Gosport MB	Hampshire	1922	1974	Gosport
Lytham St Annes MB	Lancashire	1922	1974	Fylde
Watford MB	Hertfordshire	1922	1974	Watford
Ilford MB	Essex	1926	1965	Redbridge
Leyton MB	Essex	1926	1965	Waltham Forest
Twickenham MB	Middlesex	1926	1965	Richmond upon Thames
Walthamstow MB	Essex	1929	1965	Waltham Forest

== 1930–39 ==
There were fifty-three incorporations of boroughs in this period.

Municipal Borough	County	Created	Abolished	Successor(s)
Barking MB	Essex	1931	1965	Barking, Newham
Worksop MB	Nottinghamshire	1931	1974	Bassetlaw
Barnes MB	Surrey	1932	1965	Richmond upon Thames
Brentford and Chiswick MB	Middlesex	1932	1965	Hounslow
Hendon MB	Middlesex	1932	1965	Barnet
Heston and Isleworth MB	Middlesex	1932	1965	Hounslow
Rugby MB	Warwickshire	1932	1974	Rugby
Bilston MB	Staffordshire	1933	1966	absorbed by Walsall CB, West Bromwich CB and Wolverhampton CB
Dartford MB	Kent	1933	1974	Dartford
Finchley MB	Middlesex	1933	1965	Barnet
Fleetwood MB	Lancashire	1933	1974	Wyre
Goole MB	West Riding of Yorkshire	1933	1974	Boothferry
Rowley Regis MB	Staffordshire	1933	1966	absorbed by Dudley CB, Halesowen MB, Warley CB and West Bromwich CB
Southgate MB	Middlesex	1933	1965	Enfield
Stretford MB	Lancashire	1933	1974	Trafford
Willesden MB	Middlesex	1933	1965	Brent
Wood Green MB	Middlesex	1933	1965	Haringey
Colwyn Bay MB	Denbighshire	1934	1974	Colwyn
Mitcham MB	Surrey	1934	1965	Merton
Sutton and Cheam MB	Surrey	1934	1965	Sutton
Swinton and Pendlebury MB	Lancashire	1934	1974	Salford
Tottenham MB	Middlesex	1934	1965	Haringey
Beckenham MB	Kent	1935	1965	Bromley
Oldbury MB	Worcestershire	1935	1966	absorbed by Halesowen MB, Warley CB and West Bromwich CB
Radcliffe MB	Lancashire	1935	1974	Bury
Sale MB	Cheshire	1935	1974	Trafford
Cleethorpes MB	Lincolnshire, Parts of Lindsey	1936	1974	Cleethorpes
Eastleigh MB	Hampshire	1936	1974	Eastleigh
Halesowen MB	Worcestershire	1936	1974	Dudley
Malden and Coombe MB	Surrey	1936	1965	Kingston upon Thames
Scunthorpe MB	Lincolnshire, Parts of Lindsey	1936	1974	Scunthorpe
Southall MB	Middlesex	1936	1965	Ealing
Surbiton MB	Surrey	1936	1965	Kingston upon Thames
Altrincham MB	Cheshire	1937	1974	Trafford
Bebington MB	Cheshire	1937	1974	Wirral
Beddington and Wallington MB	Surrey	1937	1965	Sutton
Bexley MB	Kent	1937	1965	Bexley
Crosby MB	Lancashire	1937	1974	Sefton
Edmonton MB	Middlesex	1937	1965	Enfield
Epsom and Ewell MB	Surrey	1937	1974	Epsom and Ewell
Romford MB	Essex	1937	1965	Havering
Wanstead and Woodford MB	Essex	1937	1965	Redbridge
Wembley MB	Middlesex	1937	1965	Brent
Weston-super-Mare MB	Somerset	1937	1974	Woodspring
Chingford MB	Essex	1938	1965	Waltham Forest
Dagenham MB	Essex	1938	1965	Barking, Redbridge
Erith MB	Kent	1938	1965	Bexley
Kettering MB	Northamptonshire	1938	1974	Kettering
Slough MB	Buckinghamshire	1938	1974	Slough
Tipton MB	Staffordshire	1938	1966	absorbed by Dudley CB, Warley CB and West Bromwich CB
Barry MB	Glamorganshire	1938	1974	Vale of Glamorgan
Farnworth MB	Lancashire	1939	1974	Bolton
Prestwich MB	Lancashire	1939	1974	Bury

== 1939–54: a halt to incorporations ==
The incorporations of Farnworth and Prestwich in 1939 were to be the last for fifteen years.

Initially a halt was put to the creation of new boroughs for the duration of the 1939–1945 war. The Local Elections and Register of Electors (Temporary Provisions) Act 1939, a piece of emergency war time legislation, provided that no changes could be made to the status or boundaries of local government areas. The legislation was renewed on an annual basis until 1945.

With the ending of hostilities a Local Government Boundary Commission was appointed in October 1945 to review the entire structure of local administration. While the review was being held, no petitions for incorporation were made.

The commission was abolished without completing its work in 1949, and following a change of government in 1951, new applications for incorporation were again accepted.

== 1954–55 ==
Nine towns were incorporated in the years 1954 and 1955.

Municipal Borough	County	Created	Abolished	Successor(s)
Harrow MB	Middlesex	1954	1965	Harrow
Solihull MB	Warwickshire	1954	1964	Solihull CB
Whitley Bay MB	Northumberland	1954	1974	North Tyneside, Blyth Valley
Castleford MB	West Riding of Yorkshire	1955	1974	Wakefield
Ellesmere Port MB	Cheshire	1955	1974	Ellesmere Port
Enfield MB	Middlesex	1955	1965	Enfield
Rhondda MB	Glamorganshire	1955	1974	Rhondda
Spenborough MB	West Riding of Yorkshire	1955	1974	Kirklees
Uxbridge MB	Middlesex	1955	1965	Hillingdon

== 1956–74 ==
The only new municipal boroughs were created by amalgamation of existing corporations in this period. In fact there was a decrease in the number of municipalities as various local government changes were made.

- In 1961 the boroughs of Huntingdon and Godmanchester were merged.
- In 1965 forty-two boroughs (including three county boroughs) were abolished when they were constituted part of Greater London. These were: Acton, Barking, Barnes, Beckenham, Beddington and Wallington, Bexley, Brentford and Chiswick, Bromley, Chingford, Croydon CB, Dagenham, Ealing, East Ham CB, Edmonton, Enfield, Erith, Finchley, Harrow, Hendon, Heston and Isleworth, Hornsey, Ilford, Kingston upon Thames, Leyton, Malden and Coombe, Mitcham, Richmond (Surrey), Romford, Southall, Southgate, Surbiton, Sutton and Cheam, Tottenham, Twickenham, Uxbridge, Walthamstow, Wanstead and Woodford, Wembley, West Ham CB, Willesden, Wimbledon and Wood Green.
- In 1966 six boroughs in the Black Country were abolished: Bilston, Oldbury, Rowley Regis, Smethwick, Tipton, Wednesbury, while the new county borough of Warley was created.
- In 1967 the borough of Torquay was absorbed by the new county borough of Torbay, while six boroughs were merged with rural districts to become "rural boroughs". The boroughs involved were Bishop's Castle, Bridgnorth, Lostwithiel, Ludlow, Much Wenlock and Oswestry. The county borough of West Hartlepool merged with the non-county borough of Hartlepool to form a new county borough of Hartlepool.
- In 1968 Queenborough became part of the larger borough of Queenborough-in-Sheppey, and Fowey part of the borough of St. Austell with Fowey. The new county borough of Teesside absorbed the four boroughs of Middlesbrough, Redcar, Stockton-on-Tees and Thornaby-on-Tees. The borough of South Molton was also absorbed into the rural district of the same name.

Municipal Borough	County	Created	Abolished	Successor(s)
Huntingdon and Godmanchester MB	Huntingdonshire (1961–65), Huntingdon and Peterborough (1965–74)	1961	1974	Huntingdon
St Austell with Fowey MB	Cornwall	1968	1974	Restormel
Queenborough-in-Sheppey MB	Kent	1968	1974	Swale

== Unsuccessful petitions for incorporation ==
In order for a town to be incorporated as a borough, a petition was submitted to the privy council for consideration. Although the majority of petitions were successful, a number of applications were not. Petitions seeking incorporation were recorded in The London Gazette, and the following is a list of petitions listed in the Gazette in the period 1882 to 1955 that did not lead to the grant of a charter:

Scheme area (urban district unless stated otherwise)	County	Gazette Date	Notes
Castleford	Yorkshire, West Riding	31 January 1893	Gained incorporation in 1955
Brentford	Middlesex	17 March 1893	Gained incorporation as Brentford and Chiswick in 1932
Ealing	Middlesex	17 March 1893	
Aylesbury	Buckinghamshire	19 May 1893	Gained incorporation in 1917
Llandudno	Caernarvonshire	27 June 1893	
Parish of St Margaret and St John, Westminster	County of London	19 January 1897	Became part of the Metropolitan Borough of Westminster in 1900
Merthyr Tydfil	Glamorgan	21 May 1897	Gained incorporation in 1905
Cleethorpes	Lincolnshire, Parts of Lindsey	9 July 1897	Gained incorporation in 1936
Parish of Kensington	County of London	9 July 1897	Became a metropolitan borough in 1900
Cleckheaton	Yorkshire, West Riding	13 October 1897	
Heckmondwike	Yorkshire, West Riding	13 October 1897	
Liversedge	Yorkshire, West Riding	15 October 1897	
Shipley	Yorkshire, West Riding	20 May 1898	
Ealing	Middlesex	12 August 1898	Second petition. Gained incorporation in 1901
Leyton	Essex	21 October 1898	Gained incorporation in 1926
Chiswick	Middlesex	15 May 1900	Gained incorporation as Brentford and Chiswick in 1932
Stretford	Lancashire	25 March 1902	Gained incorporation in 1933
Wood Green	Middlesex	20 October 1908	Gained incorporation in 1933
UDs of Eston, South Bank in Normanby and the parish of Normanby	Yorkshire, North Riding	21 February 1912	
Hebburn	Durham	17 January 1912	
Hebburn	Durham	18 December 1925	Second petition
Eston	Yorkshire, North Riding	18 December 1925	Second petition
Pontypridd	Glamorgan	18 December 1925	
Hoylake and West Kirby	Cheshire	18 December 1925	
Cannock	Staffordshire	16 November 1934	
Penge	Kent	27 February 1934	
Newton-in-Makerfield	Lancashire	10 October 1933	
Harrow	Middlesex	19 November 1935	Gained incorporation in 1954
Woking	Surrey	10 April 1936	
Coseley	Staffordshire	20 August 1937	
Carshalton	Surrey	15 October 1937	
Coulsdon and Purley	Surrey	1 February 1938	
Bingley	Yorkshire, West Riding	14 June 1938	
Huyton-with-Roby	Lancashire	23 November 1951	
Brierley Hill	Staffordshire	26 February 1952	
Staines	Middlesex	21 April 1952	
Haltemprice	Yorkshire, East Riding	8 April 1952	
Bognor Regis	West Sussex	27 May 1952	
Hinckley	Leicestershire	22 August 1952	
Willenhall	Staffordshire	26 September 1952	
Long Eaton	Derbyshire	2 September 1952	
Beeston and Stapleford	Nottinghamshire	6 January 1953	
Colne Valley	Yorkshire, West Riding	27 January 1953	
Ruislip-Northwood	Middlesex	24 February 1953	
Farnborough	Hampshire	21 April 1953	
Leek	Staffordshire	22 May 1953	
Malvern	Worcestershire	23 June 1953	
Urmston	Lancashire	30 June 1953	
Friern Barnet	Middlesex	3 July 1953	
Carshalton	Surrey	25 August 1953	Second petition
Cannock	Staffordshire	11 September 1953	Second petition
Hayes and Harlington	Middlesex	2 March 1954	
Sutton-in-Ashfield	Nottinghamshire	9 March 1954	
Paignton	Devon	21 May 1954	
Pontypridd	Glamorgan	16 July 1954	Second petition
Cheadle and Gatley	Cheshire	15 February 1955	
Hornchurch	Essex	20 May 1955	
Farnham	Surrey	25 November 1955	
Woking	Surrey	13 December 1955	Second petition

The 1955 petition by Woking was the last application before reorganisation of local government in 1965 and 1974.
