= Paul Holmes =

Paul Holmes may refer to:

- Paul Holmes (broadcaster) (1950–2013), New Zealand radio and television broadcaster
- Paul Holmes (Liberal Democrat politician) (born 1957), British politician
- Paul Holmes (Conservative politician) (born 1988), British politician
- Paul Holmes (academic), American priest and academic
- Paul Holmes (footballer) (1968–2024), English footballer
- Paul Holmes (director), British film maker
- Paul K. Holmes III (born 1951), American lawyer and federal judicial nominee
- Paul Holmes, British singer/songwriter, member of the band Deuce
