= Netley Castle =

Castle in Netley, Hampshire, England

- Netley, Hampshire
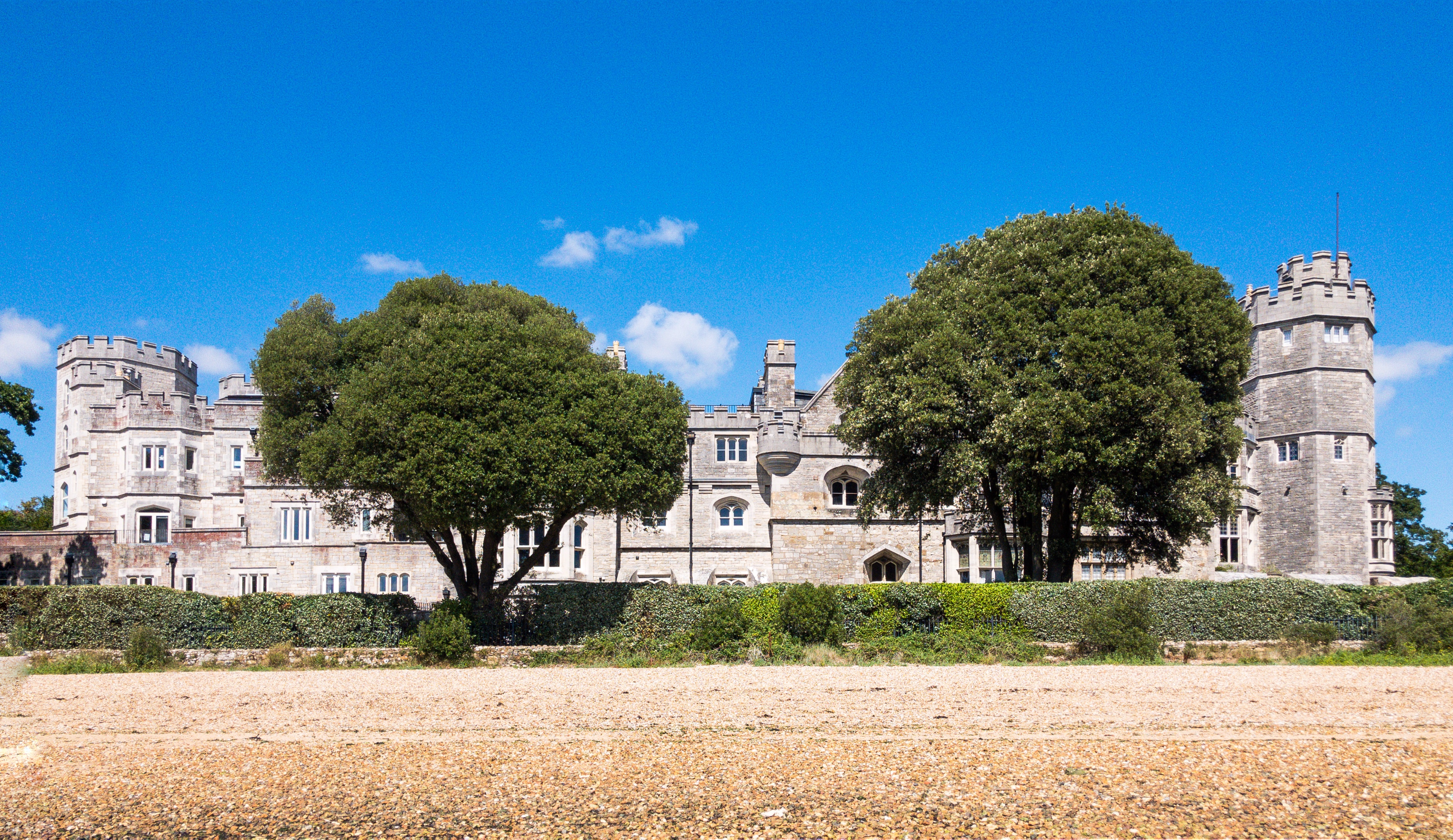
- Netley Castle as seen from the shore

Site information
- Owner: Private
- Open to the public: No
- Condition: Intact

Location
- Coordinates: 50°52′41″N 1°21′36″W

Site history
- Built: 1542 or 1544
- Materials: Stone
- Events: English Civil War

Listed Building – Grade II*
- Official name: Netley Castle
- Designated: 21 October 1974
- Reference no.: 1336957

Netley Castle is a former artillery fort constructed in either 1542 or 1544 by Henry VIII in the village of Netley, Hampshire. It formed part of the King's Device programme to protect against invasion from France and the Holy Roman Empire, and it defended Southampton Water near the Solent. The castle included a central, stone keep with two flanking gun platforms and was garrisoned by ten men. It was decommissioned during the English Civil War and by 1743 it was overgrown and in ruins. In the 19th century the property was gradually converted into a private house, being extended in a Gothic style, complete with octagonal towers. Between 1939 and 1998 it was used as a nursing home, until the high costs of maintenance led to its closure. Following an archaeological survey, it was then converted into nine residential flats. It is protected under UK law as a Grade II* listed building.

== History ==
=== 16th–17th centuries ===
Netley Castle was built as a consequence of international tensions between England, France and the Holy Roman Empire in the final years of the reign of King Henry VIII. Traditionally the Crown had left coastal defences to the local lords and communities, only taking a modest role in building and maintaining fortifications, and while France and the Empire remained in conflict with one another, maritime raids were common but an actual invasion of England seemed unlikely. Modest defences, based around simple blockhouses and towers, existed in the south-west and along the Sussex coast, with a few more impressive works in the north of England, but in general the fortifications were very limited in scale.

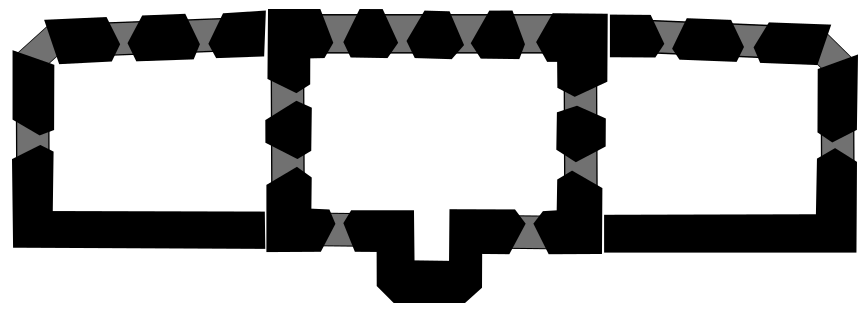
Plan of the upper levels of the 16th-century castle, showing the keep (centre) and the two adjacent firing platforms

In 1533, Henry then broke with Pope Paul III in order to annul the long-standing marriage to his wife, Catherine of Aragon and remarry. Catherine was the aunt of Charles V, the Holy Roman Emperor, and he took the annulment as a personal insult. This resulted in France and the Empire declaring an alliance against Henry in 1538, and the Pope encouraging the two countries to attack England. An invasion of England appeared certain. In response, Henry issued an order, called a "device", in 1539, giving instructions for the "defence of the realm in time of invasion" and the construction of forts along the English coastline.

Netley Castle was built next to Southampton Water between the mouths of the Hamble and Itchen rivers, 250 metres (820 ft) south-west of the remains of Netley Abbey. Netley Abbey had been recently dissolved by Henry, and material from the site was reused to build the castle. William Paulet, later the Marquess of Winchester, was in charge of the construction, which took place in either 1542 or 1544 and Henry granted him various estates to pay for the support of the fort and its garrison. The castle took the form of a central keep, 19.5 by 14 metres (64 by 46 ft) across with deep embrasures along the battlements, and a gun platform on either side; its design resembled that at nearby Southsea. It was initially garrisoned with two soldiers, six gunners and a porter, under the command of a captain.

It was still garrisoned in the mid-1620s and was probably still in active service at the start of the English Civil War between the supporters of King Charles I and Parliament in 1642. Captain Swaley, a Parliamentary naval commander, seized Netley at the end of that year and decommissioned it as a fortification. During the Interregnum, the castle was restored to use, due to concerns about a potential Royalist invasion, but was abandoned as obsolete after the restoration of Charles II to the throne. By the time that Alexander Pope visited in 1734, the castle was overgrown and in ruins.

=== 18th–20th centuries ===
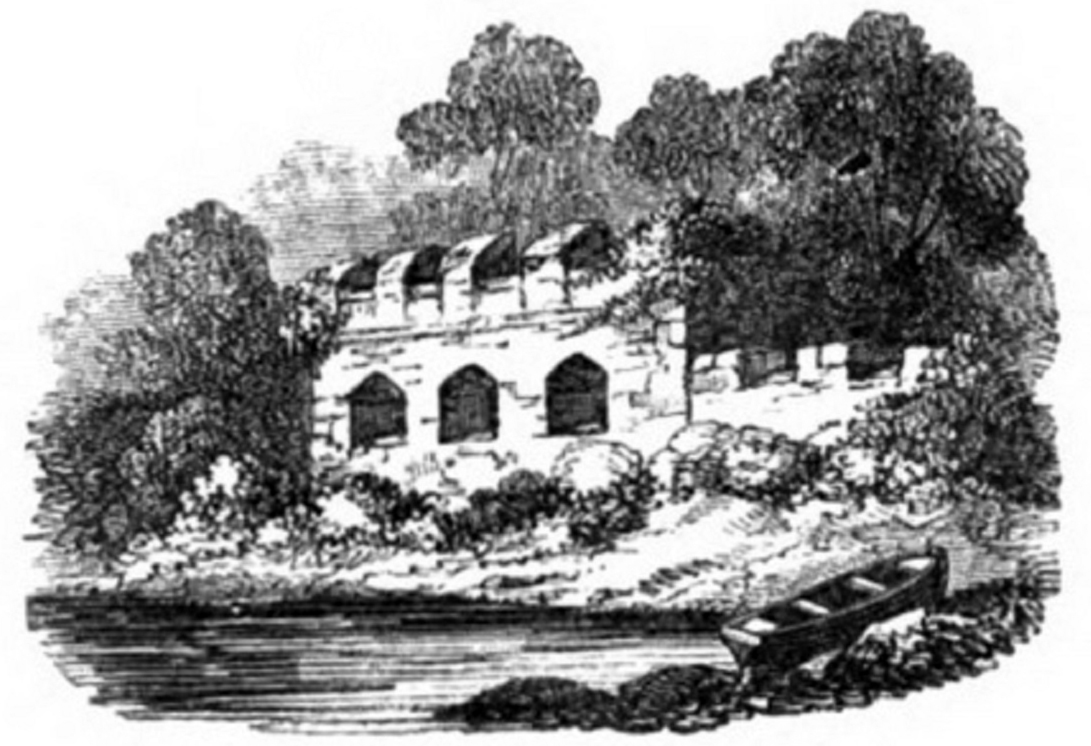
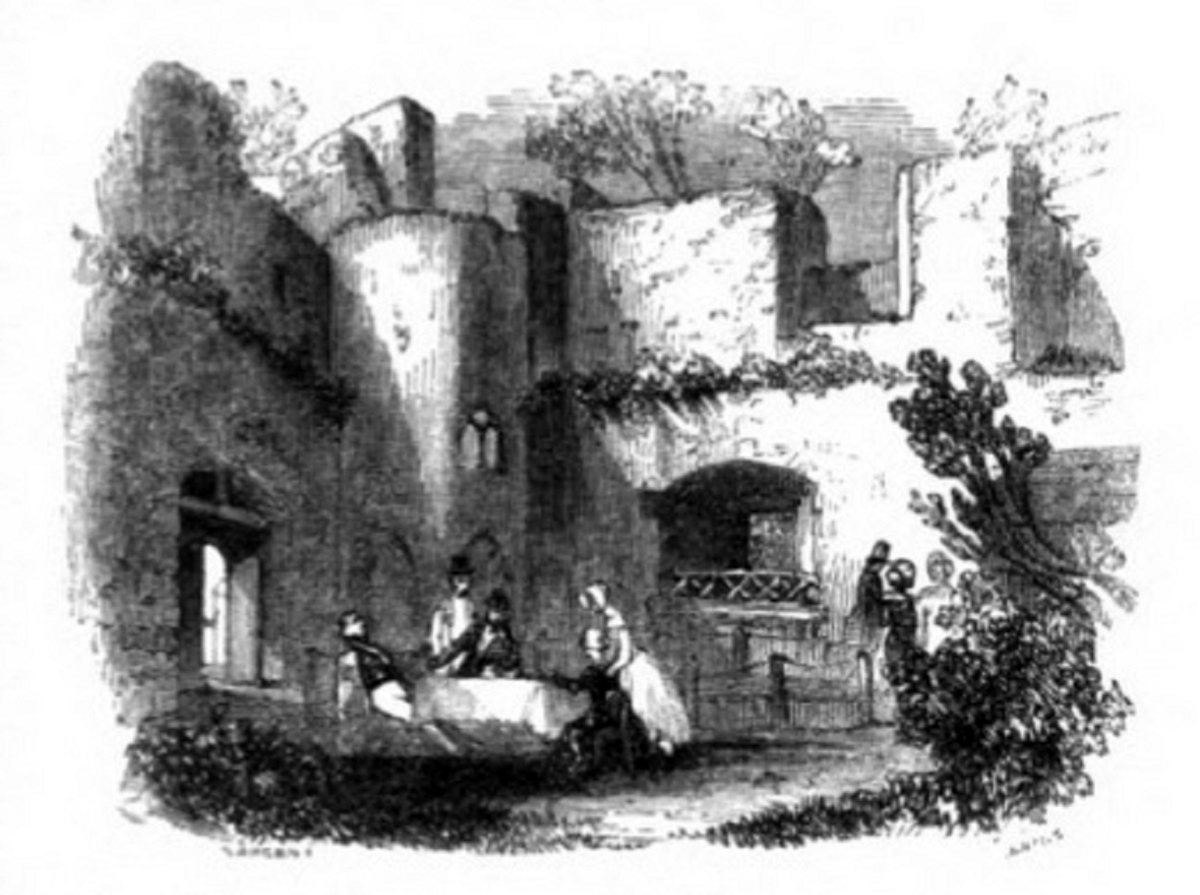
Netley in the 1840s, showing the exterior facing the sea (left) and a social gathering on the inside of the ruins (right)

William Chamberlayne inherited the castle in 1826 and built a crenellated tower on the south-east end of the property the following year, inspired by a proposal by the antiquarian Horace Walpole that the castle be made habitable. A description of the castle around this time suggested it stood "in the midst of a thicket of trees, on a little hill close to the beach" and formed "a striking object seen from the water". It became popular with artists, and J. M. W. Turner visited and sketched the castle and its new tower, probably in 1832.

George Hunt leased the castle in 1841 and it was turned into a private house under the supervision of the architect George Guillame. Hunt remained at Netley until 1857, by when the castle had an oriel window overlooking the sea, and the battlements had been blocked in to allow the construction of a second storey to the building. George Sherriff leased the castle between 1868 and 1873, building a stone wall around the front of property.

Sir Henry Crichton bought the castle in 1881, along with the surrounding gardens, orchards, pond and a boat house. The architect John Sedding remodelled the castle between approximately 1885 and 1890, creating a Gothic styled house, adding another storey and a new wing. After Crichton's death in 1922 his wife remained in the house until her death in 1936, when the property and the surrounding grounds were sold at auction.

Middlesex County Council bought the castle in 1939 and converted it into a nursing home for elderly men; it passed into the control of the National Health Service in 1948 and continued to be used as a nursing home. It proved expensive to maintain and the surrounding land was gradually sold off, until the Southampton University Hospital NHS Trust finally decided to close it in 1998.

=== 21st century ===
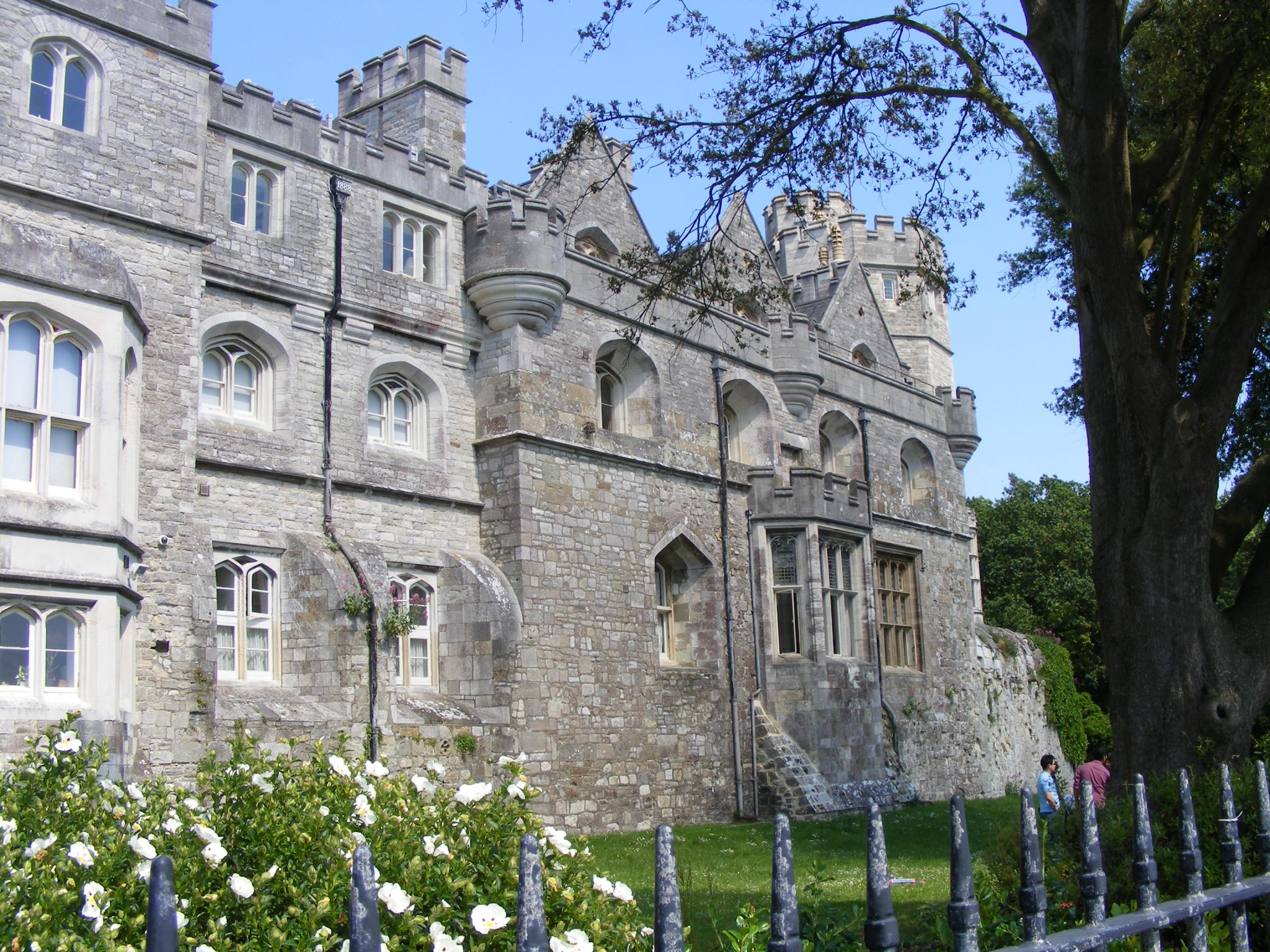
North wing of the castle in 2008

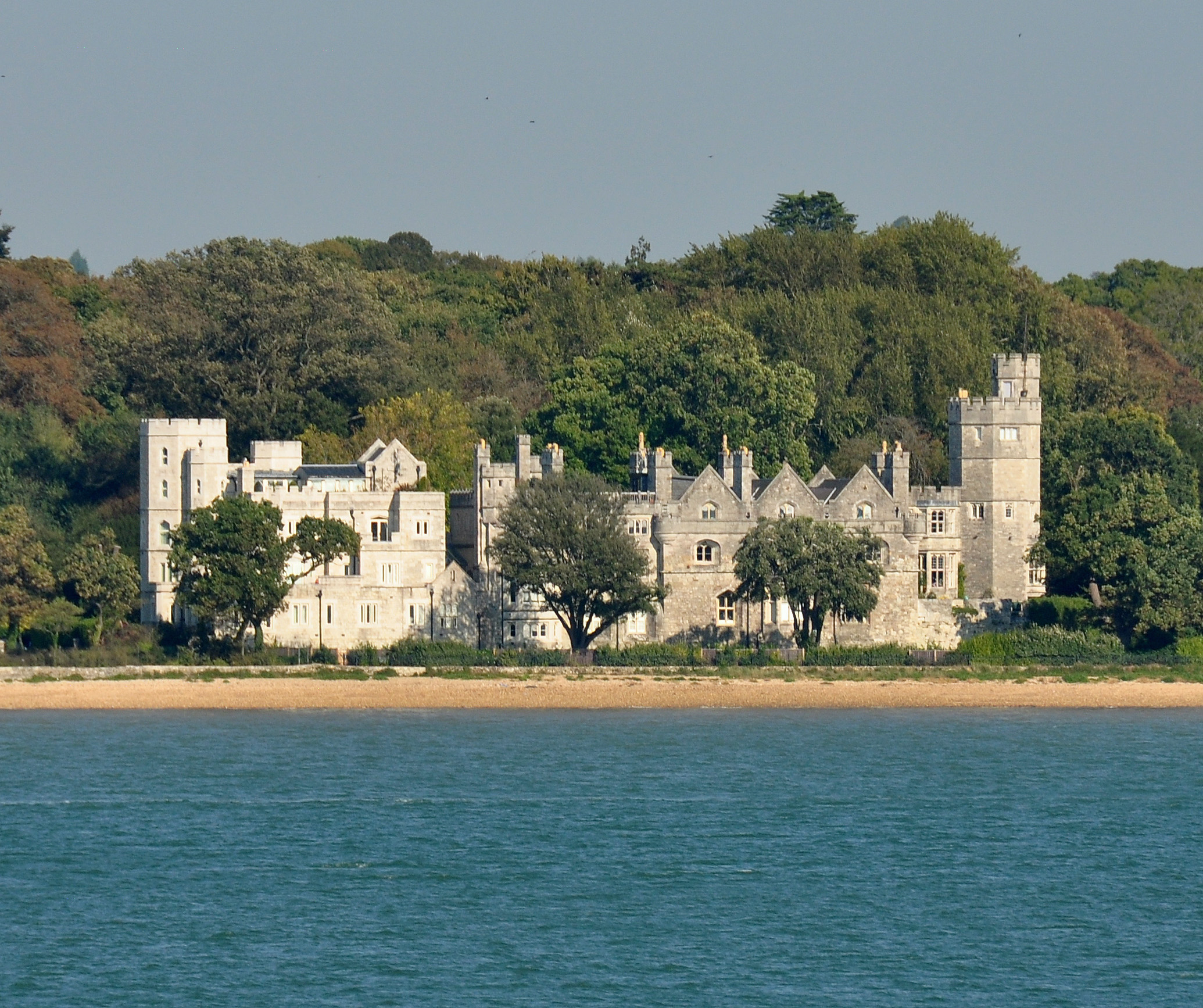
The castle in 2011

Fairmist Limited, a firm of property developers, purchased Netley Castle in 2000 and converted it into nine private residential flats, at a cost of £1.7 million, during which process an archaeological survey was made of the property. It is protected under UK law as a Scheduled Monument and a Grade II* listed building.

The castle is now approximately 62 by 14 metres (203 by 46 ft) across and 13.5 metres (44 ft) tall, surrounded by 1.54 hectares (3.8 acres) of land. The castle comprises three wings, with the original 16th-century fort incorporated into the centre of the property. The north wing is three storeys tall, decorated in a restrained Gothic style and has an octagonal turret on one corner. The central range is two storeys tall, with round corner turrets and battlements. The southern wing is two storeys in height, with elaborate Gothic detailing and another, larger octagonal tower. The castle features a substantial staircase, fitted with a musical organ, and a wood-panelled billiard room. Other buildings around the main castle include the converted boat house and a former ice house.

== See also ==
- Castles in Great Britain and Ireland
- List of castles in England

== Bibliography ==
- Beattie, William (1844). The Castles and Abbeys of England. London, UK: George Virtue. OCLC 7370166.
- Bullar, John (1840). A Companion in a Visit to Netley Abbey (8th ed.). London, UK: T. Baker. OCLC 235756496.
- Guillame, William (1848). Architectural Views and Details of Netley Abbey. Southampton, UK: Forbes and Knibbs. OCLC 7881011.
- Hale, John R. (1983). Renaissance War Studies. London, UK: Hambledon Press. ISBN 0907628176.
- Harrington, Peter (2007). The Castles of Henry VIII. Oxford, UK: Osprey Publishing. ISBN 9781472803801.
- King, D. J. Cathcart (1991). The Castle in England and Wales: An Interpretative History. London, UK: Routledge Press. ISBN 9780415003506.
- Morley, B. M. (1976). Henry VIII and the Development of Coastal Defence. London, UK: Her Majesty's Stationery Office. ISBN 0116707771.
- Pevsner, Nikolaus; Lloyd, David (1967). The Buildings of England Hampshire and the Isle of Wight. London, UK: Penguin Books. ISBN 0140710329.
- Saunders, Andrew (1989). Fortress Britain: Artillery Fortifications in the British Isles and Ireland. Liphook, UK: Beaufort. ISBN 1855120003.
- Thompson, M. W. (1987). The Decline of the Castle. Cambridge, UK: Cambridge University Press. ISBN 1854226088.
- Walton, Steven A. (2010). "State Building Through Building for the State: Foreign and Domestic Expertise in Tudor Fortification". Osiris. 25 (1): 66–84. doi:10.1086/657263. S2CID 144384757.
