= Burridge =

Village in Hampshire, England

Coordinates: 50.891°N 1.264°W

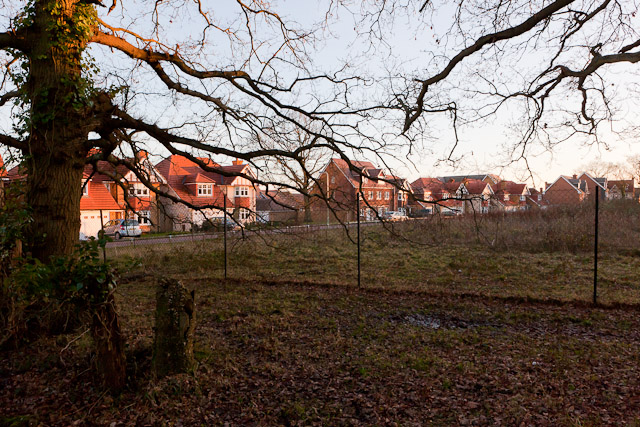
- Development in Burridge
- Country: England
- Sovereign state: United Kingdom
- Post town: Southampton
- Postcode district: SO31
- Dialling code: 01489

Burridge is a small village in the Borough of Fareham, south of Hampshire, England. It lies approximately 14 miles south of Winchester on the A3051 between Botley and Park Gate. It is also to the north of Sarisbury and to the west of Whiteley. The village was formerly known as Caiger's Green, but the name Burridge became more popular as the village grew (named after Burridge Farm).

== Area ==
Its traditional industry was the growing of strawberries, which were distributed by rail from Swanwick railway station.

== Sport and amenities ==
Burridge AFC has four adult sides, playing in the Drew Smith Southampton Saturday League, Gosport & Fareham Football League and the Meon Valley Football League.

Burridge Cricket Club's first XI plays in the second division of the Southern Electric Premier Cricket League.

Burridge and Swanwick Residents Association serves the local community. Website

Burridge Village Hall has rooms for hire for the benefit of the local community.
