= Swanwick =

Swanwick may refer to:

- Swanwick, Derbyshire, a village in England
- Swanwick, Hampshire, a village in England
- Lower Swanwick, Hampshire, a hamlet in England
- Swanwick, Illinois, United States
- Swanwick, Missouri, United States

== Persons with the surname ==
- Anna Swanwick (1813–1899), English author and feminist
- Chris Swanwick (born 1993), British racing car driver
- Frederick Swanwick (1810–1885), English civil engineer
- Frederick ffoulkes Swanwick (died 1913), Australian politician
- Graham Swanwick (1906–2003), British judge
- Helena Swanwick (1864–1939), British feminist and pacifist
- James Swanwick (born 1975), Australian-American investor and television host
- John Swanwick (1740–1798), American poet and politician
- Michael Swanwick (born 1950), American science fiction author
- Peter Swanwick (1922–1968), British actor
- Peter Swanwick (cricketer) (born 1945), English cricketer

== See also ==
- Martian Manhunter, aka Calvin Swanwick, DC Comics character
- John Swanwick Bradbury, 1st Baron Bradbury (1872–1950), British economist and public servant
- John Swanwick Drennan (1809–1893), Irish poet
- NATS Swanwick, a combined area control centre and terminal control centre operated by National Air Traffic Services (NATS) at Swanwick, Hampshire
- Swanwick Shore Strict Baptist Chapel, baptist chapel in Lower Swanwick, Hampshire
- Swanwick Hall School, a school in Swanwick, Derbyshire
- Swanwick Lakes, nature reserve in Swanwick, Hampshire
- Swanwick railway station, railway station in Fareham, Hampshire
- Swanwick Junction railway station, railway station near Swanwick, Derbyshire
- Swanwick writers' summer school, annual writers' conference held near Swanwick, Derbyshire
