= List of places of worship in the Borough of Fareham =

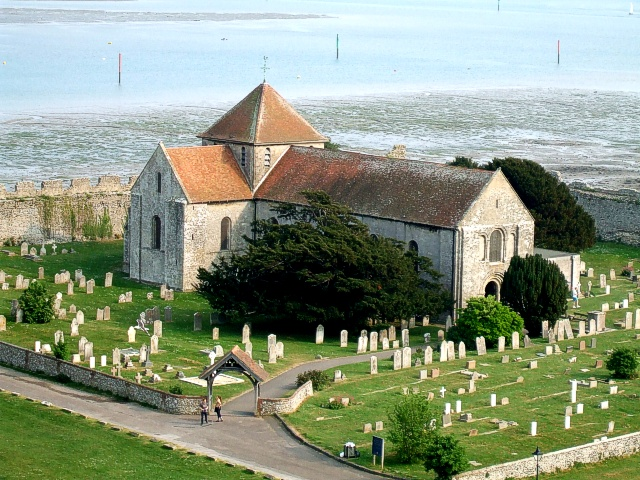
St Mary's Church, seen from Portchester Castle, was built in the early 12th century within the walls of a Roman fort.

There are 40 current and former places of worship in the borough of Fareham in Hampshire, England. There are 37 churches, chapels and meeting halls currently in use by various Christian denominations across the borough, and three former places of worship survive in alternative uses or, in one case, awaiting a new occupant. Fareham is one of 13 local government districts in the county of Hampshire—a large county in central southern England, with a densely populated coastal fringe facing the English Channel and a more rural hinterland. The borough of Fareham is largely urban and is located in the south of the county, occupying most of the gap between the cities of Southampton and Portsmouth. The old market town of Fareham, which gives the borough its name, is also the largest urban centre; much of the rest of the borough consists of 19th- and 20th-century suburban development which has joined up older villages such as Portchester, Sarisbury, Swanwick and Warsash.

The 2011 United Kingdom census reported that the majority of Fareham's residents are Christian. The largest number of churches in the borough belong to the Church of England—the country's Established Church. Ancient Church of England parish churches at Titchfield, Portchester, Crofton (Note: The old village and parish of Crofton is now within the modern village of Stubbington.) and in Fareham town survive in use; more were built in the Victorian era, particularly as the vast parish of Titchfield was divided as its villages grew; and two other Anglican churches opened in the 1960s in Fareham town. Various Nonconformist groups started to meet locally in the early 19th century. Chapels in Titchfield and Sarisbury have their origins in small-scale Congregational meetings; Methodists were established in Fareham and Portchester by 1812 and 1826 respectively; and a Strict Baptist cause at Lower Swanwick is approaching its 200th anniversary. The oldest of the borough's Roman Catholic churches dates from 1878, but the others are postwar buildings; and smaller groups such as Jehovah's Witnesses and the Plymouth Brethren Christian Church became established locally in the 20th century.

Historic England has awarded listed status to nine active and all three former places of worship in the borough. Buildings of "special architectural or historic interest" are placed on a statutory list by Historic England, a Government body. Buildings of Grade I status, held by Portchester and Titchfield's Anglican churches, are defined as being of "exceptional interest"; three other churches are listed at Grade II*, used for "particularly important buildings of more than special interest"; and Grade II, a status held by four current and all three former churches, is used for buildings of "special interest".

== Overview of the borough and its places of worship ==
The borough is located in the south of Hampshire.

The Borough of Fareham is situated in the south of Hampshire. It covers an area of 7,423.27 hectares (18,343.3 acres) and had a population of over 110,000 in 2011. The borough is mainly urban, and the vast majority of the population live in built-up areas. Water surrounds the borough to the west, southwest and southeast. The western boundary is formed by the River Hamble; on the other side is the Borough of Eastleigh. The foreshore of The Solent extends for several miles southeastwards from the river to Stokes Bay, forming the Borough of Fareham's southwestern edge. To the southeast, the land on which Portchester Castle, church and Roman fort are built juts out into the northwestern branch of Portsmouth Harbour. There are also land boundaries with the Borough of Gosport to the south, Portsmouth city to the east and the City of Winchester district to the north.

Saint Wilfrid is believed to have arrived in present-day Hampshire in 648 AD and introduced Christianity to the area around the River Meon. St Peter's Church at Titchfield was one of several churches founded in the period between this and the Norman conquest of England; like the county's other early churches its parish served villages across a wide area. Stonework in the lowest stage of the tower, originally a porch, survives from the Anglo-Saxon era, probably from around 700 AD. Also of ancient origin is St Mary's Church at Portchester, dated definitively to the mid-1130s and "a first-class Norman monument" retaining its original cruciform plan. By the end of the Middle Ages only one other church in the area covered by the present borough: Fareham town's parish church, St Peter and St Paul, originally a small chapel but now greatly extended. Its appearance was transformed in the 18th and 19th centuries, but the medieval chancel is now a side chapel.

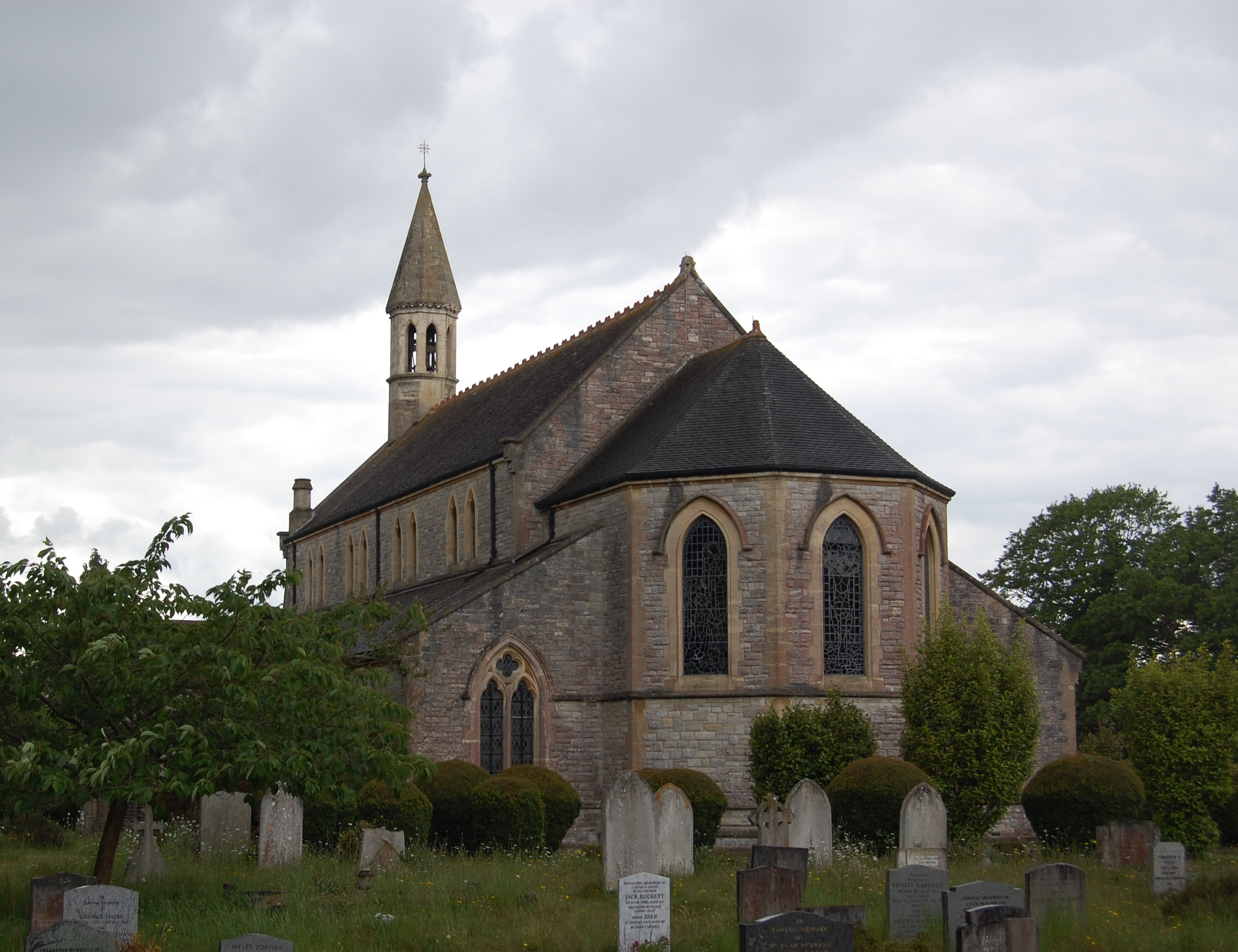
St Mary's Church at Hook (1870) was one of several built in Titchfield parish.

The population of the vast Titchfield parish grew in the 19th and 20th centuries as its constituent villages developed and the area became suburbanised. In less than 100 years, the ecclesiastical parish was subdivided five times to create six separate parishes. First to be created was the parish of Sarisbury with Swanwick in 1837, whose parish church was built around that time. In 1871, the parish of Crofton was formed; the ancient St Edmund's Church was supplemented by a new church in Stubbington, the main centre of population, later that decade. In 1872, Hook with Warsash parish was established for St Mary's Church at Hook, built the year before. Locks Heath parish was formed in 1893; a parish church built the following year replaced an earlier mission chapel. Finally, in 1930 a separate parish was created for Lee-on-the-Solent in the neighbouring borough of Gosport.

Until 1873, Roman Catholics in the Fareham area were served by the Catholic mission at Soberton, where a converted farmhouse served as a chapel and presbytery. This was founded in 1747 by descendants of James III of Scotland who had fled persecution in the north of England. Fr James Bellord, a future Vicar Apostolic of Gibraltar, founded a mission chapel in a shed in Fareham town centre in 1873, and the permanent Church of the Sacred Heart was opened in 1878. Mass was celebrated in neighbouring Portchester from 1935, and a church was built in 1954 (now demolished). By 1960 a weekly Mass was said in a drill hall at Park Gate by priests from Fareham, and the permanent Church of St Margaret Mary opened in 1966. In 1976 a Mass centre was established in Stubbington, superseded in 1985 by the present Church of Our Lady of the Immaculate Conception; and in 1980 St Philip Howard's Church was opened in the south of Fareham town. For some years from 1973, Roman Catholics also shared St Columba's Anglican church in the Hill Park area of the town.

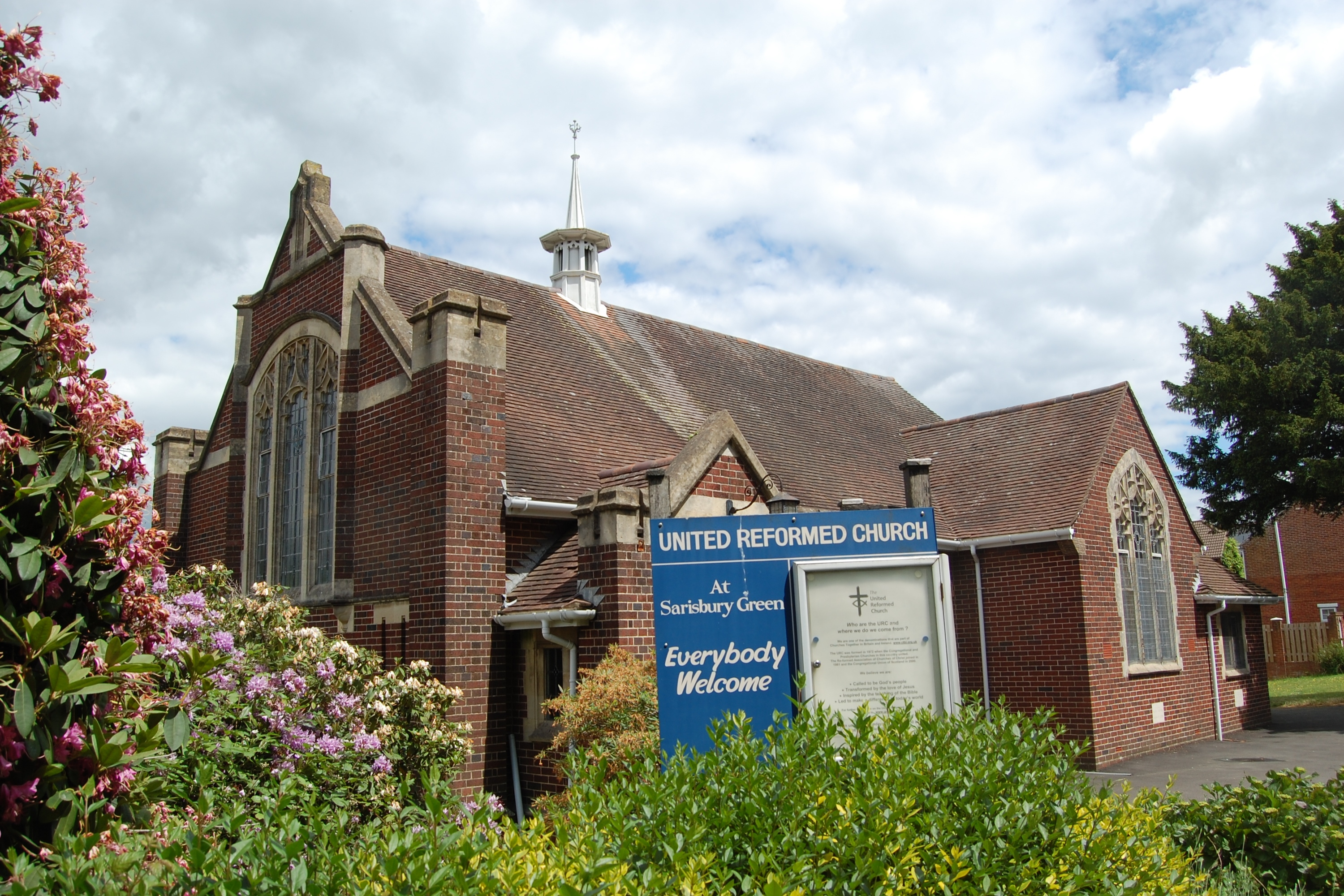
Sarisbury Green United Reformed Church was built in 1930, but its origins go back to the start of the 19th century.

The Congregational movement, one of the forerunners of the present United Reformed Church denomination, (Note: The United Reformed Church denomination was formed from the amalgamation of the Congregational Church and the Presbyterian Church of England in 1972.) was represented from the 17th century in Fareham town. In 1836 adherents built a yellow-brick Gothic Revival chapel in the town centre. This was sold for conversion into a pub and replaced by a modern building nearby in 1994. A chapel was established at Titchfield in the early 19th century, (Note: Now an Evangelical church.) and members of this church started house meetings at Warsash in 1811; a chapel was built there in 1845, and the present Warsash United Reformed Church replaced it in 1890. The cause at Sarisbury Green was also founded in the early 19th century: house meetings developed from about 1800, and a chapel was provided in 1803. In 1878 a second building (described as a branch church) opened on Chapel Road, now Swanwick Lane, in Lower Swanwick. The 1803 chapel was replaced by a tin tabernacle and then by the present church in 1931. The 1878 chapel at Lower Swanwick, which was formally registered as Swanwick Lane (Providence) Congregational Church in 1925, was deregistered in March 1980 and has been demolished, as was the former Locks Heath United Reformed Church. This had opened in 1902 and was funded by a yacht-builder from Gosport. The church at Sarisbury Green also assisted in establishing it. It closed c. 1980 and the building was demolished after several years of use by the Baptists of Locks Heath Free Church. Their new church was opened in 1990, and six years later another Baptist church was registered in Stubbington. Another new Baptist church was registered in 2004 in the Hill Park area of Fareham. In the town centre, the original Baptist chapel was replaced by a new building on the road to Gosport in 1932. The group known as Strict Baptists have been established in the area even longer: they have worshipped at Lower Swanwick since 1835, and their present chapel dates from 1844. It replaced a converted wooden boat-shed which regularly flooded during high tides on the tidal River Hamble. Methodist congregations (all originally from the Wesleyan branch of that denomination) became established in Fareham town in 1812, Portchester in 1826 and Stubbington in the mid-19th century, but all now occupy 20th-century buildings. The present churches were registered in 1939, 1933 and 1992 respectively. A Lutheran mission was founded in 1971, leading to the founding of Our Saviour Lutheran Church in 1975 with a newly-constructed building in Mendips Road. The building was demolished in 2002, but the church continues to operate in hired premises on Highlands Road.Our Saviour Lutheran Church

Gospel halls and chapels with an Evangelical or Open Brethren character opened at Warsash (1908, but with origins in the 1860s), central Fareham (1910; rebuilt 1977; closed 2011), Park Gate (1922; rebuilt 1967), the Hill Park area of Fareham (1955; closed 2004) and the West End area of Fareham (1959; rebuilt 1965). Meanwhile, the Brethren group now known as the Plymouth Brethren Christian Church opened a meeting room in Fareham in 1948 and registered their current building in 1972.

== Religious affiliation ==
According to the 2011 United Kingdom census, 111,581 lived in the borough of Fareham. Of these, 63.77% identified themselves as Christian, 0.48% were Muslim, 0.27% were Hindu, 0.25% were Buddhist, 0.07% were Sikh, 0.06% were Jewish, 0.46% followed another religion, 27.4% claimed no religious affiliation and 7.25% did not state their religion. The proportions of Christians and people who followed no religion were higher than the figures in England as a whole (59.38% and 24.74% respectively). Islam, Judaism, Hinduism, Sikhism and Buddhism had a much lower following in the borough than in the country overall: in 2011, 5.02% of people in England were Muslim, 1.52% were Hindu, 0.79% were Sikh, 0.49% were Jewish and 0.45% were Buddhist.

== Administration ==
=== Anglican churches ===
All Anglican churches in the borough are part of the Anglican Diocese of Portsmouth, which is based at Portsmouth Cathedral. The diocese has seven deaneries plus the cathedral's own separate deanery. The Fareham Deanery is responsible for all the borough's parish churches: St Peter and St Paul, St John the Evangelist, Holy Trinity and St Columba in Fareham town, the Holy Rood and the old parish church of St Edmund at Stubbington, St John the Baptist at Locks Heath, St Mary at Hook (Warsash), St Mary at Portchester, St Paul at Sarisbury Green, St Peter at Titchfield and Whiteley Church in Whiteley Village.

=== Roman Catholic churches ===
The Roman Catholic churches in Fareham, Park Gate and Stubbington are part of the Roman Catholic Diocese of Portsmouth, whose seat is the Cathedral of St John the Evangelist in Portsmouth. All are in the Solent Pastoral Area of Deanery 5. The parish of Fareham and Portchester includes the churches of the Sacred Heart and St Philip Howard, both in Fareham town centre; a church in Portchester built in 1954 and dedicated to Our Lady of Walsingham has been demolished. As well as Portchester and Fareham, the villages of Knowle, Wickham, North Boarhunt and Southwick are covered by the parish. St Margaret Mary's church at Park Gate is the parish church of an area covering Titchfield, Warsash, Sarisbury, Locks Heath, Lower Swanwick, Swanwick, Whiteley Village, Burridge and Curdridge. The parish of Stubbington and Lee-on-the-Solent covers those two villages and is served by the Church of the Immaculate Conception in Stubbington and St John the Evangelist's Church in Lee-on-the-Solent (in the Borough of Gosport).

=== Other denominations ===
The borough's three Methodist churches—at Fareham, Portchester and Stubbington—are part of the 23-church East Solent and Downs Methodist Circuit. Fareham Baptist New Life Church, Hill Park Baptist Church, Locks Heath Free Church and Stubbington Baptist Church belong to the Southern Counties Baptist Association. Swanwick Shore Strict Baptist Chapel is affiliated with the Gospel Standard Baptist movement. Titchfield Evangelical Church belongs to two Evangelical groups: the Fellowship of Independent Evangelical Churches (FIEC), a pastoral and administrative network of about 500 churches with an evangelical outlook, and Affinity (formerly the British Evangelical Council), a network of conservative Evangelical congregations throughout Great Britain.

== Listed status ==
| Grade | Criteria |
|---|---|
| Grade I | Buildings of exceptional interest, sometimes considered to be internationally important. |
| Grade II* | Particularly important buildings of more than special interest. |
| Grade II | Buildings of national importance and special interest. |

Two churches in the borough are Grade I-listed, three have Grade II* status and seven (including three former churches) are listed at Grade II. As of February 2001, there were 423 listed buildings in the borough of Fareham: 2 with Grade I status, 15 listed at Grade II* and 406 with Grade II status. In England, a building or structure is defined as "listed" when it is placed on a statutory register of buildings of "special architectural or historic interest" by the Secretary of State for Digital, Culture, Media and Sport, a Government department, in accordance with the Planning (Listed Buildings and Conservation Areas) Act 1990. Historic England, a non-departmental public body, acts as an agency of this department to administer the process and advise the department on relevant issues.

== Current places of worship ==
Current places of worship
| Name | Image | Location | Denomination/ Affiliation | Grade | Notes | Refs |
|---|---|---|---|---|---|---|
| Holy Trinity Church (More images) | | Fareham; 50.852241°N 1.183429°W | Anglican | II* | As the town's population increased in the early 19th century, a second church was provided to cater to the working classes. Designed by Jacob and Thomas Ellis Owen in 1834–35, it was designed to be "light and uplifting". Mainly of yellow brick from Bembridge on the Isle of Wight, it has been described as "elegant", "graceful" and "an outstanding example of an 1830s Gothick church". The landmark spire became unsafe and was removed in 1992. | |
| St Peter and St Paul's Church (More images) | | Fareham; 50.855133°N 1.175087°W | Anglican | II* | The medieval chancel of Fareham's parish church survives as a side chapel, but much of the rest of the building is 18th- and 19th-century: the Italianate tower dates from 1742, the nave was greatly enlarged in 1812–14, and Arthur Blomfield added a new Gothic Revival chancel in 1886–87. Charles Nicholson remodelled the interior in 1930. Local Fareham red brick and blue-grey brick from nearby Wallington is used throughout. | |
| St John the Evangelist's Church (More images) | | Fareham; 50.847658°N 1.191677°W | Anglican | – | The dedication comes from the war-destroyed St John the Evangelist's proprietary chapel in Portsmouth, built in 1789. A second church was founded from it in the 1850s in the dockyard area; money from its sale was used to fund a new church in Fareham. A church hall was built first and was used for services from October 1955, then the present church was consecrated in November 1963 and completed soon afterwards. Described as "highly characteristic of its date" and "more eccentric than distinctive", St John's was designed and built in 1962–64 by R.P. Thomas to serve an area of new housing. The bell-tower evokes Skylon, the symbol of the Festival of Britain; other architectural features include a trapezoidal roof. | |
| Fareham Baptist New Life Church (More images) | | Fareham; 50.845600°N 1.182450°W | Baptist | – | A Baptist chapel was recorded in Fareham in 1908 (situated on West Street), but the present church building on the road to Gosport south of the town centre was registered in April 1932. | |
| Christ Church Fareham (More images) | | Fareham; 50.855879°N 1.175904°W | Evangelical | – | The church was founded in 2018 by members of Christ Central Church in Portsmouth. The Church meets every Sunday at Orchard Lea Junior School on Kennedy Avenue. The first service was held on 9 September 2018 at the Ashcroft Arts Centre in Fareham town centre. The Church is part of the Newfrontiers family of churches. | |
| Fareham Community Church (More images) | | Fareham; 50.852814°N 1.184089°W | Evangelical | – | This Evangelical church occupies former commercial premises in the town centre. It was registered as a place of worship with the name The King's Centre in August 1998. | |
| Kingdom Hall (More images) | | Fareham; 50.861954°N 1.175031°W | Jehovah's Witnesses | – | This Kingdom Hall for the Fareham and Titchfield Congregations of Jehovah's Witnesses dates from 1990. It superseded one which had occupied the first floor of a building elsewhere in the town since 1970. | |
| Fareham Methodist Church (More images) | | Fareham; 50.851676°N 1.181993°W | Methodist | – | The present church is the third serving Methodists (originally Wesleyans) in Fareham. The first was bought from another group in 1812 and was replaced by a newly built Decorated Gothic Revival chapel on West Street in 1875. Many of the second chapel's internal fittings were moved to the new brick-built church, for which the foundation stone was laid on 2 November 1938. It opened on 24 May 1939 and was registered in that month. The Sunday school had been established in 1859. | |
| West End Chapel (More images) | | Fareham; 50.844027°N 1.198911°W | Open Brethren | – | The original West End Gospel Hall was based in a different location in Fareham between November 1959 and March 1965, when it was superseded by the present chapel. | |
| Brethren Meeting Room (More images) | | Fareham; 50.852217°N 1.190480°W | Plymouth Brethren Christian Church | – | This meeting room is associated with the main Brethren hall in the area, at Horndean in East Hampshire district. An earlier building on a similar site—opposite the station approach road at the west end of Fareham's West Street—was registered in March 1948 and was succeeded by the present building in January 1972. | |
| Church of the Sacred Heart (More images) | | Fareham; 50.851162°N 1.178683°W | Roman Catholic | – | "Unfortunately marooned" in the middle of a maze of major roads near Fareham bus station, this small Decorated Gothic Revival dates from 1878, succeeding a converted shed opened five years earlier. Architect John Crawley also designed the nearly identical church at nearby Havant, also of flint with some brickwork and a steep slate-tiled roof. A fire caused some internal damage in 1973. The church was not registered for marriages until 1903. | |
| St Philip Howard's Church (More images) | | Fareham; 50.850564°N 1.200891°W | Roman Catholic | – | This was founded as a daughter church to the Sacred Heart in the town centre and was built and registered in June 1980. It remains within the parish of Fareham and Portchester. | |
| Fareham Free Seventh Day Adventist Church (More images) | | Fareham; 50.853262°N 1.181922°W | Seventh-Day Adventist | – | A Gospel hall in Osborn Road which had been registered in September 1910 was superseded by the present building in May 1977. This closed in November 2011 and was acquired by the Free Seventh Day Adventist Church, an Adventist group distinct from the larger Seventh-day Adventist Church denomination. As of 2019 it was one of three such churches in the United Kingdom. | |
| Fareham United Reformed Church (More images) | | Fareham; 50.854187°N 1.182666°W | United Reformed Church | – | This church was built in 1994–95 to replace the original United Reformed church (formerly a Congregational chapel) on West Street in the town centre. It was registered in March 1994. A "creditable design" by K. C. White Partnership, it is a brick building on a square plan with timber-framed corner windows and a pyramidal roof topped with an octagonal lantern. | |
| St Columba's Church (More images) | | Hill Park, Fareham; 50.858101°N 1.214288°W | Anglican | – | A tin tabernacle dedicated to St Columba (click for image) was erected in Catisfield in 1891 and opened in July 1892, but by the 1960s it was too small for the growing population west of Fareham. A new church was designed in 1961, the first stone was laid in May 1962 and the new St Columba's Church opened on a different site in February 1963. It cost £17,500 and is of dark brick with wood and aggregate panelling. A separate bell-tower, evoking the architecture of Basil Spence, stands in the grounds. | |
| Hill Park Baptist Church (More images) | | Hill Park, Fareham; 50.860492°N 1.207666°W | Baptist | – | The original place of worship on this site was the Hill Park Gospel Hall, which was registered for marriages in April 1955 and deregistered in January 2004. This was re-registered for use by a Baptist congregation, but a replacement church has subsequently been built. | |
| St Mary's Church (More images) | | Hook; 50.847339°N 1.290998°W | Anglican | II | The foundation stone for this chapel of ease within Titchfield parish was laid on 16 August 1870, the church was consecrated exactly a year later, and it was parished within six months. John Raphael Rodrigues Brandon's Gothic Revival church has elements of the Early English, Decorated and Perpendicular styles and is "a building of many quirks". It has a nave with a clerestory, chancel and polygonal apse but no transepts, tower or spire: a bell-cot supported on a prominent buttress rises from the west gable. The walls are of rubble and ashlar. The scheme of stained glass dates from 1950, replacing windows destroyed by a World War II bomb. | |
| St John the Baptist's Church (More images) | | Locks Heath; 50.861350°N 1.261425°W | Anglican | – | A mission chapel within the parish of Hook-with-Warsash was founded in 1886. A parish was formed from parts of Titchfield, Hook and Sarisbury in 1893, and the following year land was bought for a new church. The mission church became a school after Ewan Christian's Swanage and Bath stone Gothic Revival church opened in 1895. | |
| Waypoint Church (South) (More images) | | Locks Heath; 50.856794°N 1.256064°W | Baptist | – | Baptist worshippers founded Locks Heath Free Church in 1981 and moved into the recently closed former United Reformed Church building of 1902 on Hunts Pond Road. By the end of the 1980s the church had nearly 200 members, so land was secured nearby and a new church was built; it could hold 250 worshippers and 150 in an adjacent hall, and various other rooms could be used for community purposes. The cost was £540,000. The first service was held on 14 January 1990 and the church was registered for marriages two months later. A building project to extend the church concluded in late 2019, and the new building was registered with its present name in June 2022. | |
| Swanwick Shore Strict Baptist Chapel (More images) | | Lower Swanwick; 50.881546°N 1.296619°W | Strict Baptist | II | George Harding established a Strict Baptist chapel in a former boat-shed in 1835 after several years during which he attended and sometimes ministered at the nearby Independent chapel in Sarisbury. The wooden building was condemned in 1844, and with the help of the adjacent boatyard's owner Harding opened the present chapel. Little alteration has taken place since: a vestry was added to the rear later in the 19th century, but the interior retains many original fittings. | |
| Duncan Road Church (More images) | | Park Gate; 50.872742°N 1.266067°W | Open Brethren | – | The origin of this church was a "tent mission" established by visiting evangelists in 1921–22. It was originally named Swanwick Gospel Hall, and meetings took place in a tin tabernacle. This was demolished in May 1966, and on 21 May 1967 the current premises were opened. A marriage licence was granted in January 1951. | |
| St Margaret Mary's Church (More images) | | Park Gate; 50.872672°N 1.267723°W | Roman Catholic | – | A drill hall in Park Gate was hired for Catholic services until a permanent church was built in 1964–65. The first service was held on 8 January 1966 and the church was registered in that month. A local architect (Robert S. Shaw) and building firm were used, and the church (described as "reflect[ing] postwar architecture" but including unusual features such as a prefabricated spire and side walls in a saw-tooth configuration) cost £30,000. There is dalle de verre glass designed by Margaret Traherne. A harmonious extension with large areas of glazing was added in 2004. | |
| Peel Common Church (More images) | | Peel Common; 50.822966°N 1.190041°W | Evangelical | – | The building was registered under the name Peel Common Mission Hall in January 1942. | |
| St Mary's Church (More images) | | Portchester; 50.836613°N 1.113337°W | Anglican | I | St Mary's was founded as a priory church by King Henry I in about 1130. About 20 years later the priory moved to nearby Southwick and the church became a parish church, albeit still owned by the priory until the Dissolution of the Monasteries. It stands within the walls of a Roman fort, Portus Adurni, built c. 285 AD. There is a short central tower, and the plan was originally cruciform; the south transept has been demolished. Other than this, it is an "outstandingly well-preserved Romanesque church": much Norman-era work survives. | |
| Portchester Methodist Church (More images) | | Portchester; 50.845868°N 1.123286°W | Methodist | – | The present church was built of brick in 1933 and registered in November of that year, although there was an earlier Wesleyan chapel in the village, first mentioned in 1826. In 1940 the newly built church was recorded as having a capacity of 190. | |
| St Paul's Church (More images) | | Sarisbury; 50.875606°N 1.286997°W | Anglican | II | The church is in three distinct parts. George Guillaume's nave and short tower of purple-brown bricks, built in 1835–36, transitions "abrupt[ly]" into Henry Woodyer's chancel of 1880–81, built of Swanage stone; George Fellowes Prynne's apsidal south chapel of 1922 is more in harmony with the latter. Fellowes Prynne also designed the lychgate in 1908 and had earlier drawn up plans to redesign the whole church. A "good scheme of stained glass" in a "unified High Victorian style" includes windows by Hardman & Co., James Powell and Sons and Clayton and Bell. | |
| Sarisbury Green United Reformed Church (More images) | | Sarisbury; 50.876053°N 1.286695°W | United Reformed Church | – | House services began in the area in about 1800, and the first Congregational chapel opened in 1803. A tin tabernacle was erected in 1881 on the land of Quintin Hogg and was used for 50 years (under the name Sarisbury Free Church) until the present building was erected in 1930–31. This was designed by George Baines and Son in a restrained Free Perpendicular Gothic Revival style; it opened on 22 July 1931 and was registered for marriages six months later. It was also known as the William Matson Memorial Free Church, commemorating a 19th-century minister. | |
| St Edmund's Church (Crofton Old Church) (More images) | | Stubbington; 50.834553°N 1.218783°W | Anglican | II* | Some 12th-century fabric remains, and much of the building (including the chancel and south chapel) date from the 14th century, but the church was greatly enlarged in 1728 at the expense of Thomas Missing, Member of Parliament for Southampton. Restoration work was undertaken in 1865 and 2007. Although superseded as the parish church by the Holy Rood in Stubbington village, St Edmund's is still in regular use. | |
| Holy Rood Church (More images) | | Stubbington; 50.824327°N 1.212055°W | Anglican | II | Stubbington developed rapidly in the second half of 19th century, prompting the construction of a new parish church in the village centre to supersede the ancient Holy Rood Church to the north. Thomas Goodchild designed it at a cost of £4,000 in 1878 and it was mostly completed then, but his proposed tower was not built for another 50 years and even then lacked the intended spire. John Wells-Thorpe rebuilt the chancel to a different design and orientation after it was destroyed by fire on 21 September 1968; the church also suffered bomb damage in World War II. | |
| Stubbington Baptist Church (More images) | | Stubbington; 50.833322°N 1.219859°W | Baptist | – | This church was registered in February 1996. | |
| Stubbington Methodist Church (More images) | | Stubbington; 50.827556°N 1.212898°W | Methodist | – | Stubbington's original Methodist church was established in the mid-19th century; in 1940 it was recorded as a brick-built chapel with a capacity of 80, built originally for Wesleyans. The present church dates from the early 1990s and was registered in August 1992. | |
| Church of the Immaculate Conception (More images) | | Stubbington; 50.822211°N 1.216338°W | Roman Catholic | – | A Mass centre was provided for Stubbington's Catholic in 1976 and was registered for marriages in May of that year. It attained the status of a full parish church in 1985. | |
| St Peter's Church (More images) | | Titchfield; 50.849032°N 1.232944°W | Anglican | I | The lower part of the west tower of this "fine and interesting building" dates from c. 700 AD, making it "the oldest piece of ecclesiastical architecture ... in Hampshire". The church is large-with north and south aisles and a south chapel longer than the chancel-and architecturally complex, featuring fabric from several eras. A "magnificent" marble monument (click for image) in the south chapel, designed c. 1594, commemorates the 1st and 2nd Earls of Southampton and the 1st Earl's wife. | |
| Living Word Church (More images) | | Titchfield; 50.849889°N 1.234308°W | Evangelical | – | Nonconformist worship has taken place on this site in the centre of Titchfield since the early 19th century. The church is now Evangelical in character, but it was founded as Congregational and had this character for most of its history. The building was refurbished in the 1970s and the early 20th century. Previously known as Titchfield Evangelical Church, it is now part of the Living Word Church network, which has four congregations: the Titchfield and Fareham congregations meet here, and others meet at locations in Bridgemary and Purbrook. | |
| Our Saviour Lutheran Church | | Fareham; 50.8633954°N 1.2015219°E | Evangelical Lutheran Church of England | – | A Lutheran church Mendips Road, was opened in 1972, and the church worshipped there until Easter 2002. The building was deconsecrated in 2002, sold to developers and demolished. Since then, the church has hired 10th Fareham Scout Hall for worship. | |
| Warsash Gospel Hall (More images) | | Warsash; 50.853849°N 1.291304°W | Open Brethren | – | A school was founded in Warsash in 1869 by Caroline Swinton. She made the building available for worship by Brethren, whose beliefs she followed. She died in 1903, and five years later a dedicated chapel was built on a different site and was called Swinton Hall. It opened on 12 February 1908 and was registered for marriages in November 1909. The building was refurbished and extended in 2015. | |
| Warsash United Reformed Church (More images) | | Warsash; 50.853243°N 1.294319°W | United Reformed Church | – | The pastor of Titchfield's Congregational chapel helped to found one in Warsash in 1811 (the first service was held on 19 July of that year). A new chapel was built on a different site in 1845; it was served by Titchfield's minister or by pastors from Gosport and Portsmouth. The present church, whose car park occupies the site of the 1845 building, opened on 26 May 1890 and was registered for marriages in October 1892. | |
| Whiteley Church | | Whiteley; 50.880734°N 1.257999°W | Anglican | – | This Anglican community meets at an "attractive" community building on the Whiteley estate, a late-20th-century housing development near Swanwick. | |

== Former places of worship ==
Former places of worship
| Name | Image | Location | Denomination/ Affiliation | Grade | Notes | Refs |
|---|---|---|---|---|---|---|
| Crockerhill Mission Room (More images) | | Crockerhill; 50.888576°N 1.173995°W | Anglican | II | Crockerhill is a rural hamlet north of Fareham town, near Wickham. Its Anglican mission room was still open for worship in the 1970s, when it was described as an early-19th-century red- and grey-brick single-storey Gothic Revival building with a cottage adjoining it. The former church has now been converted into a house. | |
| Our Saviour Lutheran Church (original building) | | Fareham; 50.8474893°N 1.2055366°W | Evangelical Lutheran Church of England | – | The building was constructed and consecrated in 1972 for use by Fareham Lutheran Mission, which became Our Saviour Lutheran Church in 1975. In 2002, the church sold the building and the land to a developer, who demolished it. The site is now occupied by two pairs of semi-detached houses. | |
| Fareham United Reformed Church (original building) (More images) | | Fareham; 50.852301°N 1.178145°W | United Reformed Church | II | Gosport architect James Adams designed Fareham's Congregational church in 1836, and it served worshippers for nearly 160 years: it closed and was deregistered upon the opening of a replacement church nearby in early 1994. The yellow-brick Perpendicular Gothic Revival chapel has been incorporated into the structure of a pub, part of the Slug and Lettuce pub chain. The centre bay of the three-bay façade projects and is flanked by buttresses and tall, narrow arched windows. | |
| St Francis' Church (More images) | | Funtley; 50.868790°N 1.198501°W | Anglican | II | The church was always a chapel of ease: it was founded by the former curate of St Peter and St Paul's Church, Revd Sir Henry Thompson, a year after he had also founded and become the first vicar of Holy Trinity Church in central Fareham. It is attributed to the same architects, Jacob and Thomas Ellis Owen. Originally intended as a school, it was designed for use as a chapel as well, and after a larger school was built in the village St Francis' became a permanent place of worship in 1885 (although it remained privately owned until 1933). The last service was held on 15 July 2018. The "extremely simple" building is early Gothic Revival in style with a stuccoed exterior. It has now been converted to a house. | |

== Bibliography ==
- Balfour, Alan (1970). Portsmouth. City Buildings Series. London: Studio Vista. ISBN 0-289-79806-X.
- Chambers, Ralph (1952). The Strict Baptist Chapels of England: The Chapels of Surrey and Hampshire. Vol. 1. Thornton Heath: Ralph Chambers.
- Diocese of Portsmouth (December 1959). Portsmouth Diocesan Yearbook 1960. Winchester: Donald S. Martell Ltd.
- Diocese of Portsmouth (1987). Diocese of Portsmouth Yearbook 1987. Portsmouth: Portsmouth Diocesan Information Office.
- Dwyer, Gerard (1981). Diocese of Portsmouth – Past and Present. Portsmouth: Portsmouth Diocesan Centenary Committee.
- Facey, Roy A., ed. (1981). International Church Index (Doctrinal). Index Publications. ISBN 0-907578-00-4.
- Hill, Roy (2002) [1990]. The Assemblies Address Book (PDF) (5th ed.). Bristol: Christian Year Publications. ISBN 1-872734-25-1. Archived from the original (PDF) on 19 September 2004.
- Jeffs, Peter (1995). The Locks Heath Story. Titchfield: Peter Jeffs. ISBN 0-9526760-0-1.
- Kelly, Bernard W. (1907). Historical Notes on English Catholic Missions (PDF). London: Kegan Paul, Trench, Trübner & Co.
- Lloyd, David W. (1974). Buildings of Portsmouth and its Environs: A survey of the dockyard, defences, homes, churches, commercial, civic and public buildings. Portsmouth: City of Portsmouth. ISBN 0-901559-53-9.
- McAuley, Fr James (16 July 2016). The Diocese of Portsmouth Parish Boundaries 2016 (PDF) (Report). Portsmouth: Roman Catholic Diocese of Portsmouth. Archived (PDF) from the original on 16 May 2017.
- Methodist Church of Great Britain (1947). Methodist Church Buildings: Statistical Returns including Seating Accommodation as at July 1st, 1940 (PDF). Manchester: The Department for Chapel Affairs. (Available online in 14 parts; Guide to abbreviations on page 6)
- North, Christopher (2005). Fareham: A History and Celebration. Teffont: The Francis Frith Collection. ISBN 1-84589-203-8.
- O'Brien, Charles; Bailey, Bruce; Pevsner, Nikolaus; Lloyd, David W. (2018). Hampshire: South. The Buildings of England. London: Yale University Press. ISBN 978-0-300-22503-7.
- Stell, Christopher (1991). Inventory of Nonconformist Chapels and Meeting-Houses in South-West England. London: Royal Commission on the Historical Monuments of England. ISBN 0-117011-81-9.
