= Warsash =

Village and parish in Hampshire, England

Coordinates: 50.8532°N 1.30101°W

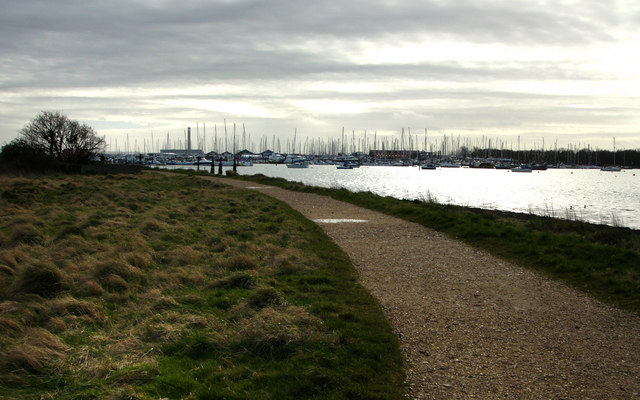
- Warsash Hamble-le-Rice and Fawley powerstation

- Location within Hampshire
- Area: 3.59 sq mi (9.3 km^{2})
- Population: 7,183 (2011 Census. Ward)
  - Density: 2,001/sq mi (773/km^{2})
- OS grid reference: SU493062
- District: Fareham
- Shire county: Hampshire
- Region: South East
- Country: England
- Sovereign state: United Kingdom
- Post town: SOUTHAMPTON
- Postcode district: SO31
- Dialling code: 01489
- Police: Hampshire and Isle of Wight
- Fire: Hampshire and Isle of Wight
- Ambulance: South Central
- UK Parliament: Hamble Valley

Warsash is a seaside village in southern Hampshire, England, situated at the mouth of the River Hamble, west of the area known as Locks Heath and south of Sarisbury. Boating plays an important part in the village's economy, and the village has a sailing club. It is also home to the Warsash Maritime Academy, part of Southampton Solent University, which provides training for Merchant Navy Officers from around the world.

The Locks Heath, Warsash and Whiteley urban area had a combined population of 43,359 according to 2011 Census. This also includes Park Gate and Swanwick and forms a subdivision of the South Hampshire built up area.

Warsash is in the borough of Fareham, and is part of the Hamble Valley parliamentary constituency. The village lies in the Hook-with-Warsash parish, with the hamlet of Hook.

== History ==
Papers relating to the surrender of Titchfield Abbey in 1537 refer to the area now known as Warsash as 'Warish Asse Field'. This is a reference to the fact that donkeys were turned out to graze along the river bank.

Before the 19th century what is now known as Warsash was a number of separate hamlets; Warsash itself; Hook to the south at the mouth of the River Hamble; Newtown between Hook and Warsash and Chilling on Southampton Water.

Hook was of earlier importance, as a 'dockyard' during the Hundred Years' War. At the end of this war Hook's importance declined, and for the next 300 years it, Chilling and Warsash continued as hamlets making livings from fishing and smuggling. Newtown had in addition a number of salterns.

Towards the end of the 18th century the land around Hook had been acquired by the Hornby family to form the Hook Estate. This new estate was bordered to the north by the existing Warsash House estate.

In 1807 the shipbuilder George Parsons, who had lost the lease of his former shipyard up-river at Bursledon, began construction of a shipyard at Warsash at a site where the present Shore Road was later built. All the buildings at the former Bursledon site, including a graving shed and a mould-loft, were dismantled and re-erected at Warsash. In partnership with his son John Parsons and grandson John Rubie, George then built a number of vessels during the following four years, including four ships for the Royal Navy:

- The 18-gun brig-sloop HMS Peruvian in 1808
- The 36-gun frigates HMS Theban and HMS Hotspur in 1809 and 1810
- The 38-gun frigate HMS Nymphe in 1812.

Following George's death in 1812, his son and grandson built a further ship for the Navy, namely the 36-gun frigate HMS Laurel.

In the 19th century Warsash started to expand in size and importance when shipbuilding moved across the river from Hamble-le-Rice. Along the coast Newtown was also expanding, the salterns had expanded into a chemical works and an iron smelting industry had started. By the mid-19th century the two communities had been linked by road, with housing along these roads filling the open space to create one community.

By the end of 19th century the lack of threat from the French had sent the shipbuilding industry into decline. The iron and chemical works were also declining. The main sources of income for the area were the burgeoning strawberry growing industry and traditional fishing and agriculture. Alongside these industries grew businesses providing refreshments and services to visitors to the area, especially those of the new leisure sailing pursuits.

=== Warsash Clock Tower ===
Warsash House Estate built a tower faced by a clock in the centre of the village to hold up to 6,000 gallons of water. In present days the water tower has been removed and the clock tower is a private residence.

=== St Mary's ===
The parish church, St Mary's, was constructed in 1870–71 and was designed by Raphael Brandon for Arthur Hornby of the Hook Estate, to which Church Road originally served as the entrance. The mansion known as Hook Park was built in 1785–91 for William Hornby, a former Governor of Bombay. The house was destroyed by fire in 1903. The old vicarage site on Osborne Road has been redeveloped and new houses erected. In 2000, local sculptor Ian G Brennan was commissioned to produce a bas-relief carving to be fitted above the entrance to the vestry.

The finished piece is made of lime-wood and shows various landmarks of the village and a large dove of peace. The approach to the church (Church Road) was previously an undeveloped laurel avenue. Many of the hedges have been replaced by fences or walls but several are still flourishing. At the end of the road the mounting block still survives, at the site of the old avenue gates.

=== D-Day ===
On 5 June 1944 British and allied commando units sailed from Warsash for the Normandy Landings. Some of the units were trained at HMS Tormentor.

== Hamble-Warsash Ferry ==
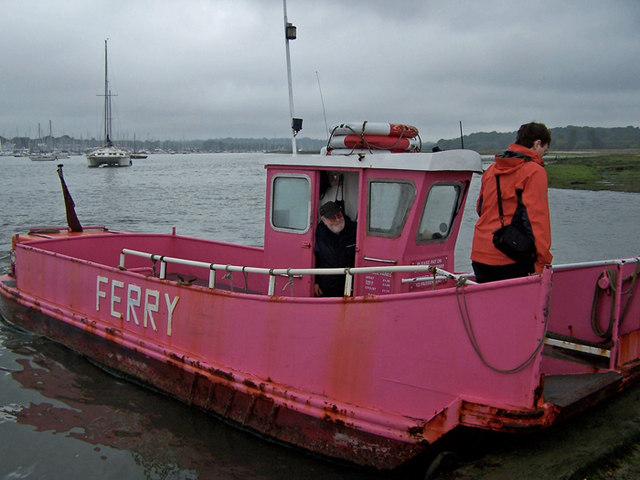
The ferry, which cannot carry motor vehicles

Warsash is the eastern landing-place for the ferry crossing the River Hamble from Hamble-le-Rice. The ferry was once an important link in a historic route between Portsmouth and Southampton. The ferry now provides a link in local, national and international footpaths such as the Solent Way and cycle routes such as National Cycle Route 2.

The ferry, a foot-passenger only service, is notable for its boats, each painted bright pink. The pink paint scheme is echoed on the shelter by the landing on the east bank of the river.

Throughout the nineteen sixties and seventies the ferry was run by a Ray Sedgwick, a local boatman who hired boats out to tourists etc. The ferry hut on the Warsash side was built in the early 1900s by the Bugle pub who sold beer to other local pubs, the hut was used to store kegs as well as providing shelter from the rain.

== School ==
Warsash has one primary school, located in Church Road. This school, Hook-with-Warsash Academy, has outstanding Ofsted ratings and is a feeder school to Brookfield Community School.

In its most recent Ofsted inspection in September 2023, the school was rated as "Good," with particular strengths noted in attendance, environment, and representation. Additionally, the school received a SIAMS (Statutory Inspection of Anglican and Methodist Schools) report in February 2023, which evaluates the school's religious character and ethos hookwithwarsash.co.uk.

== See also ==
- List of places of worship in the Borough of Fareham
