= Locks Heath =

Village and parish in Hampshire, England

Coordinates: 50.862°N 1.269°W

- Location within Hampshire
- Area: 0.66 sq mi (1.7 km^{2})
- Population: 7,104
  - Density: 10,764/sq mi (4,156/km^{2})
- District: Fareham
- Shire county: Hampshire
- Region: South East
- Country: England
- Sovereign state: United Kingdom
- Post town: Southampton
- Postcode district: SO31
- Post town: Fareham
- Postcode district: PO14
- Dialling code: 01489
- Police: Hampshire and Isle of Wight
- Fire: Hampshire and Isle of Wight
- Ambulance: South Central
- UK Parliament: Hamble Valley

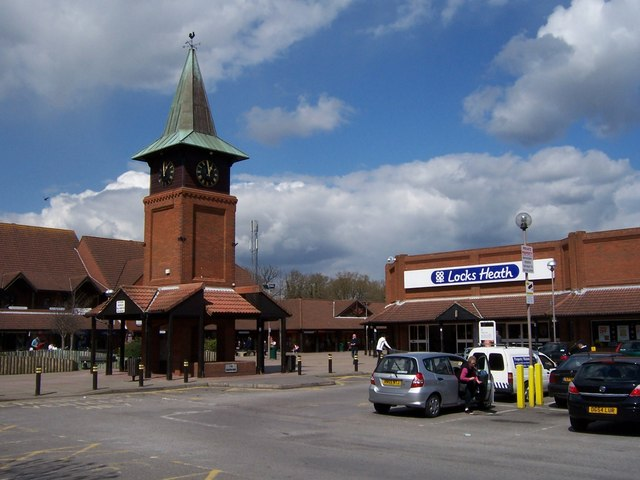
The Locks Heath District Centre

Locks Heath is a residential suburb of Fareham, in the south of Hampshire, England. Locks Heath is immediately surrounded by a collection of villages including Sarisbury to the west, Swanwick, Park Gate and Whiteley to the north, Warsash to the southwest and Titchfield to the southeast. Within the heart of the area its shopping village is located with a community centre. The population of the village was 35,757 as of 2021.

== History ==
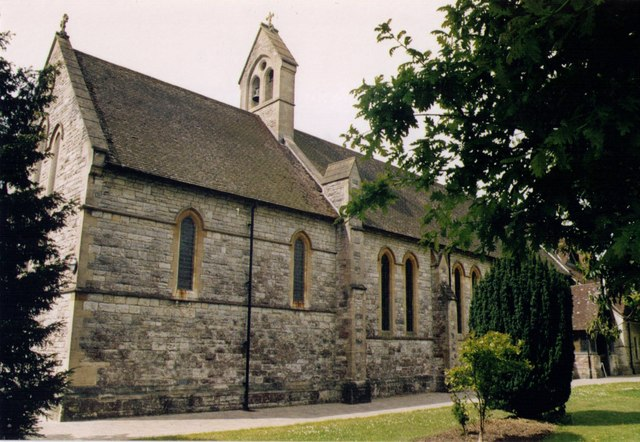
St John the Baptist, Locks Heath

In the late 19th and early 20th centuries, the most important local activity in this area was strawberry growing. The industry developed as a result of the 1866 Enclosure Acts which allowed the common land to be split into a large number of small plots. Swanwick railway station opened on 2 September 1889 and helped to facilitate the transportation of large quantities of strawberries to customers all over the country.

Strawberries were transported to the waiting trains by horse and cart. A lasting reminder of this is a rail on the outside edge of what is now the pavement leading down the hill to the station. This was used to line up the wheels of the horse-drawn carts, so as to enable easy unloading of the carts. The station was also originally much bigger with what remains of a second branch line still visible under the tarmac of what is now the station car park. A short way from the station a warehouse can be seen which used to be the 'Swanwick and District Basket Factory' which supplied the baskets to pack the strawberries into for transportation. The outline of the old signage is still visible on the outside of the building.

The strawberry industry hit its peak in the 1920s and then began to slip into decline. This was caused by a variety of factors, including the demand for development land, competition from abroad and the increasingly strict requirements of retailers for standardised products.

Although strawberries are still grown in the area, much of the land once used is now covered with houses. Because of the nature of the plots of land which were once the strawberry farms, many of the houses are built in relatively small estates. There are numerous references to strawberries in the area, such as the Talisman pub (Talisman being a variety of strawberry) and the Joseph Paxton pub, the name of a locally-grown strawberry named after the gardener and designer of Crystal Palace.

St John the Baptist church was built in 1895 to a design by Ewan Christian. It was extended in 1998.

Nikolaus Pevsner and David Wharton Lloyd wrote of Locks Heath in 1967 that "Pocket package suburbanization [is] now proceeding piecemeal; there is no need to try to describe the resultant mess".

== Facilities ==
The mid-1980s saw development of the Locks Heath area with the construction of new housing. The Lockswood Centre was built to provide additional facilities including the Lock Stock and Barrel pub (renamed the Strawberry Field Tavern in 2013) and a supermarket operated by Waitrose. The centre also includes a library/community centre and Lockswood surgery, a GP surgery.

=== Schools ===
There are many primary schools including St John’s School, Locks Heath Junior School, Locks Heath Infant and Nursery School, Hook-with-Warsash CofE Primary School, Park Gate Primary School and Sarisbury Infant and Junior School. The only state secondary school is Brookfield Community School.

== Sport and leisure ==
Locks Heath has a Non-League football club Locks Heath F.C. who play at Locks Heath Recreation ground on Warsash Road since 1894. They are currently playing in the Hampshire Premier League. Locks Heath is also home to the Locks Heath Lions youth football club.

Also in Locks Heath is a badminton club, bowls and tennis club.

Locks Heath has one pub located within the Locks Heath Shopping Centre, called The Strawberry Tavern, previously known as The Lock Stock and Barrel.

== See also ==
- List of places of worship in the Borough of Fareham
