= Lower Swanwick =

Village in Hampshire, England

Coordinates: 50°53′08″N 1°17′48″W

- Hamlet
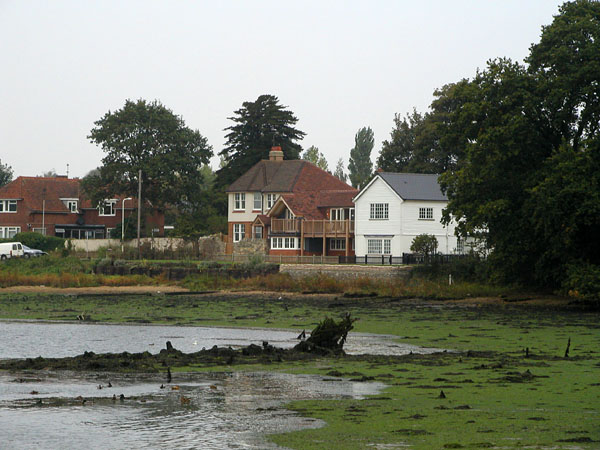
- River Hamble at Lower Swanwick

- Location within Hampshire
- OS grid reference: SU4946009847
- Civil parish: Sarisbury
- District: Fareham
- Shire county: Hampshire
- Region: South East
- Country: England
- Sovereign state: United Kingdom
- Post town: SOUTHAMPTON
- Postcode district: SO31
- Dialling code: 01489
- Police: Hampshire and Isle of Wight
- Fire: Hampshire and Isle of Wight
- Ambulance: South Central
- UK Parliament: Hamble Valley

Lower Swanwick is a hamlet on the River Hamble in Hampshire, England. It is located within the borough of Fareham at the eastern end of Bursledon Bridge, which carries the A27 across the river.

== Location ==
Lower Swanwick is close to the city of Southampton. Nearby villages include Bursledon, Hamble-le-Rice, Sarisbury and Swanwick. The housing in the area is mostly modern with a few older houses although a long row of colourful 'Fisherman's Cottages' can be seen on Swanwick Lane. The area has close ties to the sea with local marinas dominating the riverbank. The local Post Office is now closed as part of the 'Post Office Network Change Programme'.

The Old Ship pub on Bridge Road was formerly a farm house for Oslands Farm, later to become The Oslands Hotel. The name change occurred on the 10 November 1967 when Jim Newman became the tenant landlord. The building behind the pub was a farm barn and is now 3 bed room house. Also behind the pub is a long low building, formerly a dairy, this is now a 3-bed room bungalow on a large plot of land known an Nether Oslands.

Swanwick Shore Strict Baptist Chapel on Bridge Road was built in 1844 and is a Grade II listed building.

== In popular culture ==
Swanwick has become particularly popular with visitors, because the river and its landmarks are where many of the scenes for the former television series Howards' Way were filmed.
