= Croma Security =

Croma Security Solutions Group PLC
- Type: Public limited company
- Traded as: AIM: CSSG
- Industry: Security & Defence
- Founded: 1970 (as County Locksmiths)
- Headquarters: Whiteley, England
- Area served: UK, UAE, Middle East
- Key people: Roberto Fiorentino, CEO.
- Products: Aerospace & Defence
- Revenue: 10.19 Million GBP (2025)
- Number of employees: 120
- Website: cssgplc.com

Croma Security Solutions Group plc is a British security services company headquartered in Whiteley, Hampshire. The company provides locksmithing, electronic security, fire and life-safety systems and related security services to commercial and domestic customers in the United Kingdom. Its shares are traded on the AIM market of the London Stock Exchange under the ticker CSSG.

The present business developed from the combination of the Croma Group and the Southampton-based CSS Group in 2012. Its origins in the security industry can be traced to County Locksmiths, established in Southampton in 1970.

Following the £6.5 million disposal of its manned-guarding operation, Vigilant Security, in 2023, Croma has concentrated on locksmithing, fire and electronic security and on expanding a national network of security centres through acquisitions. By 30 June 2026 the company operated 17 security centres and subsequently announced two further acquisitions.

For the financial year ended 30 June 2026, Croma reported revenue of approximately £10.97 million, compared with £9.63 million in the previous year, and EBITDA from operations of approximately £1.04 million. At the year end, the group reported cash of £4.91 million and no bank borrowings, excluding lease liabilities.

== History ==
County Locksmiths and CSS

According to Croma's corporate history, County Locksmiths Security was established by Fernando Fiorentino in Southampton on 18 February 1970. Its original premises were at 324 Shirley Road and the business provided key cutting, lock installation and emergency locksmith services.

Roberto Fiorentino joined the family business in 1981. In 1989 he established County Access Systems, an electronic-security business that subsequently became County Security Systems and later CSS Total Security. The business expanded into access-control and CCTV systems. Roberto Fiorentino acquired County Locksmiths from his father in 1997.

During the 1990s and 2000s, the businesses expanded their electronic-security activities, including remote CCTV monitoring. CSS acquired Alarm Bell Ltd in 2011, adding fire-alarm and related services to its operations.

Formation of Croma Security Solutions Group

In June 2012 the CSS Group combined with Croma Group plc through a reverse takeover and flotation on AIM. The company's ticker was subsequently changed from CMG to CSSG.

The listed company itself predates the security business. Companies House records the company as having been incorporated on 12 April 1996. It was previously named Asquith Motor Carriage Group plc and, from 2000 until March 2012, Croma Group plc.

Restructuring and disposal of Vigilant Security

Croma previously operated a substantial manned-security business through Vigilant Security.

In 2023 the group disposed of Vigilant Security for £6.5 million. Croma subsequently redirected the proceeds towards expansion of its remaining security businesses, particularly through acquisitions of independent locksmith and security businesses. The company reported receiving the final payment relating to the disposal in June 2026.

Operations

Croma's current activities are principally divided between locksmithing and fire and electronic security. Its locksmith operations supply, install and maintain locks, safes, ironmongery, security shutters and related products. Its fire and security activities include CCTV, intruder alarms, access control, fire and life-safety systems, perimeter security, barriers, gates, bollards and automatic doors.

The company describes its strategy as developing a national network of security centres by acquiring established independent locksmith businesses and broadening the services offered by the acquired locations.

Croma provides services to domestic and commercial customers in sectors including healthcare, education, leisure, entertainment and utilities. Its customers include NHS trusts.

Security-centre network

At 30 June 2026 Croma operated 17 security centres. Two acquisitions completed during the 2026 financial year were TLS Security Systems in Taunton and Southern Security Services in Dorset.

After the financial year end, the company announced acquisitions in Portsmouth and Holborn, for approximately £1.72 million and £1.1 million respectively.

These acquisitions form part of the company's strategy of consolidating independent locksmith businesses into a broader security network.

Financial performance

For the year ended 30 June 2026, Croma reported revenue of £10.97 million, an increase of 13.8% from £9.63 million in the previous financial year. Organic revenue growth was reported as 4.6%.

EBITDA from operations was approximately £1.04 million, compared with £1.17 million in 2025. The EBITDA margin declined from 12.1% to 9.5%. The company reported operating profit of approximately £450,000 and profit after tax of approximately £550,000.

At 30 June 2026, Croma had cash of approximately £4.91 million, compared with £4.33 million a year earlier, and reported no bank borrowings. Its net assets were approximately £15.95 million.

The board proposed a final dividend of 2.5 pence per share, compared with 2.4 pence for the previous year.

Corporate affairs

Croma Security Solutions Group plc is an active public limited company registered in England and Wales under company number 03184978. Its registered office is Unit 7 & 8, Fulcrum 4, Solent Way, Whiteley, Fareham, Hampshire, PO15 7FT. Companies House classifies its principal activity under SIC 80200, "security systems service activities".

The company's shares trade on AIM under the ticker CSSG.

Management and board

As of November 2026, the company's board comprises:

Roberto Fiorentino, Chief Executive Officer. He has been a director of the listed company since March 2012.

Teodora Andreeva, Chief Financial Officer. She became CFO and a director in March/April 2023 and is a CIMA-qualified finance professional.

John Wakefield, Independent Non-Executive Chairman, appointed to the board in November 2025.

Andy Wonnacott, Independent Non-Executive Director, appointed in November 2025. He chairs the company's Audit and Risk Committees.

Recent developments

Croma completed several acquisitions during 2026 as part of its security-centre expansion strategy. Regulatory announcements during the year included acquisitions in January, March, August and September.

Its 2026 full-year results stated that two acquisitions completed during the financial year increased the network to 17 security centres after 30th June. Two additional businesses were acquired after that date.

See also

AIM

London Stock Exchange

Intruder Alarms

Locksmithing

Fire alarm system

Access control

Closed-circuit television
