= Church of the Sacred Heart, Fareham =

Church in Hampshire, England

Church of the Sacred Heart
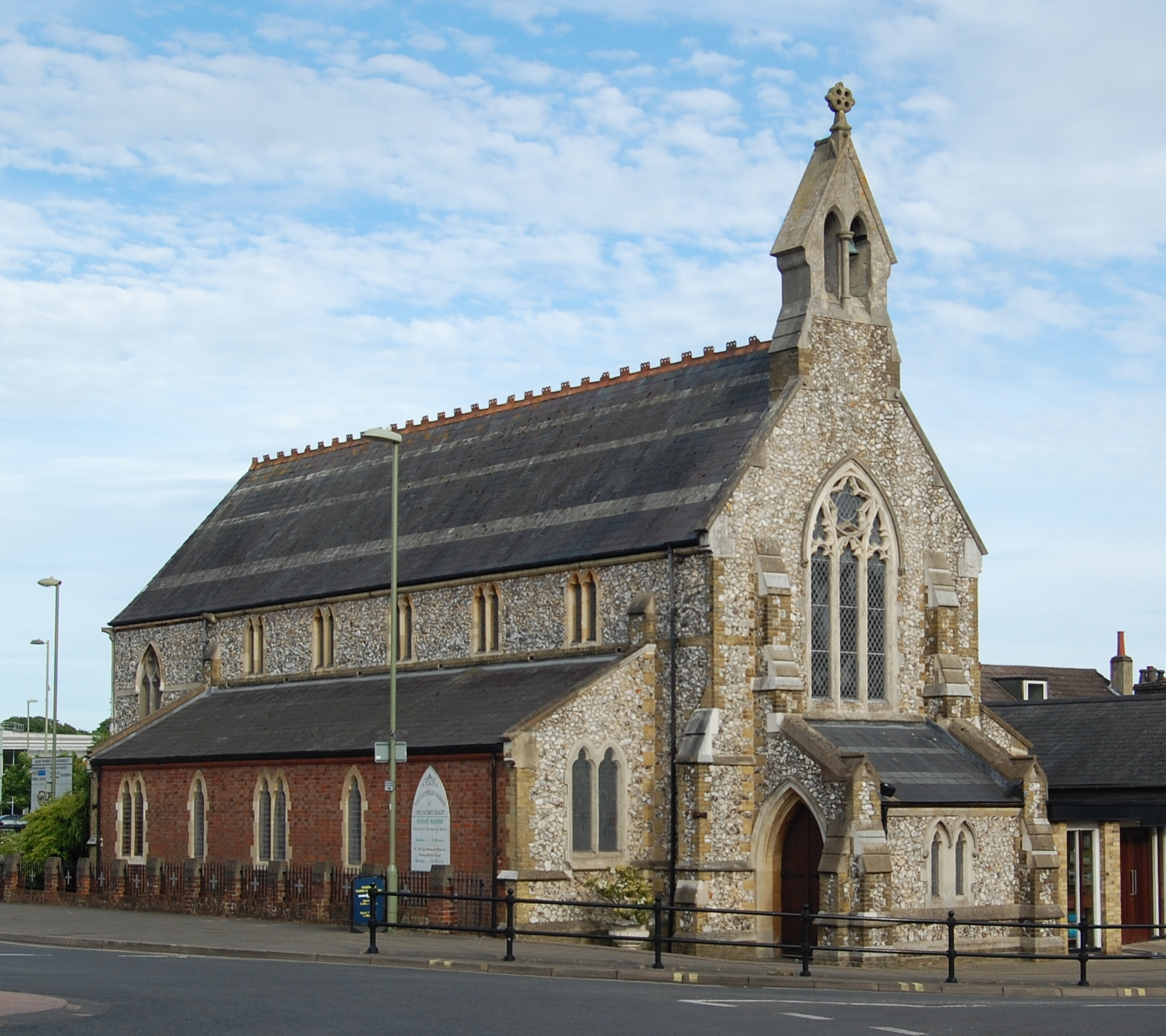
- The church from the northwest in 2019

- Location in Hampshire
- 50°51′04″N 1°10′43″W
- OS grid reference: SU 57918 06053
- Location: Portland Street, Fareham, Hampshire PO16 0NF
- Country: England
- Denomination: Roman Catholic
- Website: catholicchurchfareham.org.uk

History
- Status: Parish church
- Founded: 19 March 1877
- Founder: James Bellord
- Dedication: Sacred Heart

Architecture
- Functional status: Active
- Architect: John Crawley
- Architectural type: Church
- Style: Decorated Gothic Revival
- Groundbreaking: 19 March 1877
- Completed: 4 September 1878
- Construction cost: £2,400

Administration
- Diocese: Portsmouth
- Deanery: Deanery 5
- Parish: Fareham and Portchester

The Church of the Sacred Heart is the Roman Catholic parish church of the town of Fareham in Hampshire, southern England. It opened in 1878 on a centrally located site, replacing a converted shed which had been used for worship since 1873. John Crawley, a London-based architect whose other nearby Catholic churches include Portsmouth's Catholic cathedral and St Joseph's Church, Havant, was responsible for the design—a "small and well-detailed essay" in flint and brick, in the Decorated Gothic Revival style. The parish has a second church in an outer part of Fareham, but another in the nearby village of Portchester has closed and has been demolished.

== History ==
The post-Reformation origins of Catholic worship in the Fareham area can be traced to 1747, when some descendants of Royalists loyal to James II of England fled persecution in northern England and moved to the village of Soberton, in the Meon valley north of Fareham. They bought a farmhouse in the village and turned it into a chapel with a priest's house. It was used as a place of worship until 1839 and was served by Jesuit priests.

After this, the nearest churches to Fareham were at Havant, "one of five ancient centres of Catholicism in Hampshire", and Gosport, where the first church was built in 1750. In 1873, a Catholic mission was established in the town for the first time. James Bellord, later Vicar Apostolic of Gibraltar but at the time serving as a military chaplain, acquired a shed on West Street and converted it into a small chapel where Mass was said weekly. The building was registered for worship with the name Chapel of the Sacred Heart of Jesus on 7 February 1874. The first priest, Father T. Foran, was also a military chaplain.

Land nearby, an old timber yard, was bought soon afterwards as a site for the permanent church, although sources vary as to whether this happened in 1874 or 1877. The foundation stone of the new church was laid on 19 March 1877. Architect John Crawley of London was commissioned to design the church. Construction work took just over a year, and the first Mass was said on 4 September 1878, at which the Bishop of Southwark James Danell presided and the dedication to the Sacred Heart of Jesus was made. The church cost £2,400 to build.

The red-brick presbytery (priest's house) was built in 1934 at the end of a nearby terrace of houses, and has a physical link to the church. Postwar alterations to the road network in this part of the town centre have left the church "unfortunately marooned" between major roads. A fire in 1973 prompted some internal changes, including the installation of new pews.

== Architecture ==
John Crawley, who designed the Church of the Sacred Heart, is "not a major [architectural] figure on the national scene" but has several Catholic churches to his name. St Joseph's Church at nearby Havant (1875) is very similar in style; larger and more elaborate is the Church of Our Lady of Consolation and St Francis at West Grinstead, Sussex (1875–76). He was working on St John the Evangelist's Church in Portsmouth (now Portsmouth Catholic Cathedral) and the Church of the Sacred Heart, Hove, Sussex, when he died in 1881, and both were completed by Joseph Stanislaus Hansom.

As originally built, the church had a capacity of 300. It is a "small but proud design", built of flint with some brickwork in the Decorated Gothic Revival style, inspired by the earlier Catholic churches of Augustus Pugin. The church has a tall nave with low red-brick aisles to each side and clerestory windows above in the shape of quatrefoils. Other windows are paired lancets with Decorated Gothic-style tracery and trefoil heads. Beyond the nave is a polygonal apse which houses the sanctuary. At the west end is a narthex; next to this is an entrance lobby, built between 1976 and 1977, and linked to this is the church hall, built in the 19th century. The aisles are demaracated by arcades with octagonal and round piers. Internal fittings include a Bath stone baptismal font, an altar which was reconfigured in the 1920s and given decorative mosaic panelling featuring biblical scenes, and a modern ambo (pulpit). The tabernacle was originally in the chapel at Lambeth Hospital in London. Most of the stained glass windows are by unidentified designers, but in the south aisle is one by J. Edward Nuttgens, designed in about 1940 and depicting Jesus walking on water.

== Associated churches ==
Portchester, east of Fareham, is part of the parish. Priests from the Sacred Heart said Mass in the village from 1935, and in 1954 a permanent church was built, dedicated to Our Lady of Walsingham. It closed in 2010 and permission for its demolition was granted in 2016. Another Mass centre was established by the Sacred Heart's priests in or before 1960, this time in a drill hall at Park Gate, west of Fareham. The Church of St Margaret Mary was built in 1966 and remains in use, now as part of a separate parish. In the village of Stubbington to the south, the Sacred Heart founded a Mass centre in 1976; again, a permanent church (dedicated to Our Lady of the Immaculate Conception) was later built and remains in use, now as part of a joint parish with the church in Lee-on-the-Solent. Postwar growth in Fareham itself led to an arrangement where Mass was said at St Columba's Church, a Church of England parish church, from 1973; in 1980, a purpose-built Catholic church dedicated to St Philip Howard was built in the southern suburbs. This remains in use as part of the parish of the Sacred Heart.

== Administration ==
The Church of the Sacred Heart was registered for worship in accordance with the Places of Worship Registration Act 1855 on 13 June 1878; its number on the register is 24088. It was also registered for the solemnisation of marriages on 10 February 1903 under the terms of the Marriage Act 1836.

The present parish covers the whole of Fareham town, Portchester, and the nearby villages of Knowle, Wickham, North Boarhunt and Southwick to the north.

Two weekend Masses are offered at the church: a Vigil Mass (First Mass of Sunday) on a Saturday evening, and a 9.00am Mass on Sunday. There are also Masses on certain weekdays. Two additional Sunday Masses are held at St Philip Howard Church. The Sacrament of Reconciliation (Confession) is offered weekly on a Saturday.

== See also ==
- List of places of worship in the Borough of Fareham
- Media related to Sacred Heart church, Fareham at Wikimedia Commons

== Bibliography ==
- Diocese of Portsmouth (December 1959). Portsmouth Diocesan Yearbook 1960. Winchester: Donald S. Martell Ltd.
- Diocese of Portsmouth (1987). Diocese of Portsmouth Yearbook 1987. Portsmouth: Portsmouth Diocesan Information Office.
- Dwyer, Gerard (1981). Diocese of Portsmouth – Past and Present. Portsmouth: Portsmouth Diocesan Centenary Committee.
- Kelly, Bernard W. (1907). Historical Notes on English Catholic Missions (PDF). London: Kegan Paul, Trench, Trübner & Co.
- Lloyd, David W. (1974). Buildings of Portsmouth and its Environs: A survey of the dockyard, defences, homes, churches, commercial, civic and public buildings. Portsmouth: City of Portsmouth. ISBN 0-901559-53-9.
- McAuley, Fr James (16 July 2016). The Diocese of Portsmouth Parish Boundaries 2016 (PDF) (Report). Portsmouth: Roman Catholic Diocese of Portsmouth. Archived (PDF) from the original on 16 May 2017.
- O'Brien, Charles; Bailey, Bruce; Pevsner, Nikolaus; Lloyd, David W. (2018). Hampshire: South. The Buildings of England. London: Yale University Press. ISBN 978-0-300-22503-7.
