= Hook, Fareham =

Village in Hampshire, England

Coordinates: 50.845050017°N 1.2776532294°W

Hook
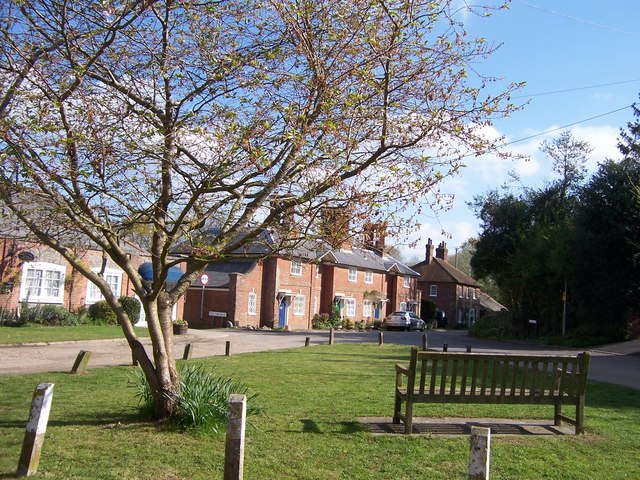
- The hamlet of Hook

- Location within Hampshire
- OS grid reference: SU50950530
- District: Fareham
- Shire county: Hampshire
- Region: South East
- Country: England
- Sovereign state: United Kingdom
- Post town: SOUTHAMPTON
- Postcode district: SO31
- Dialling code: 01489
- Police: Hampshire and Isle of Wight
- Fire: Hampshire and Isle of Wight
- Ambulance: South Central
- UK Parliament: Hamble Valley

Hook is a hamlet and former civil parish in the Fareham district, in south Hampshire, England. The parish of Hook, sometimes known as Hook-with-Warsash, until 1 April 1932, when the parish was abolished and became part of Fareham. In 1931 the parish had a population of 1,310.

== History ==
=== Prehistory ===
There appears to have been activity on the site at Hook since early prehistory, with a number of palaeolithic handaxes and other implements found in gravel terrace excavations in and around Hook during the 18th and 19th centuries. Later prehistoric artifacts have also been found in the area, including Bronze Age beakers and bucket urns, and a late Bronze Age enclosure on Hook Lane.

=== Medieval settlement ===
The name 'Hook' refers to the hook shaped spit of land at the mouth of the River Hamble. In medieval times this protected the entrance to a tidal inlet known as the fleet, hence the local name 'Fleet End'. The medieval hamlet and port of Hook occupied the southern shore of the inlet, situated some distance west of the present settlement. Even at its height the settlement was probably little more than a scatter of cottages and a chapel but its significance as a port is indicated by records of the conflict with France in 1345. It was recorded that 21 ships and 208 men left England from Hook to fight in the battle of Crécy. By the sixteenth century the Fleet was beginning to silt up and this combined with a gradual increase in the size of ships slowly led to its decline as a port.

It is mentioned in the Domesday Book by the name 'Houch' and reference to the ownership of the Manor of Hook can be traced back to the early fourteenth century. The manor was once the property of Richard, Duke of York, and there is evidence that Henry VIII once granted ownership of it to Anne of Cleves.

A map commissioned in 1595 by Queen Elizabeth I and drawn by Christopher Saxton, refers to the area around Hook as 'Hoke'.

=== Industrial hamlet ===
The modern hamlet of Hook is linked to the return to England of William Hornby, Governor of Bombay. After his return in 1783 the British Government granted Hornby land at Hook where, between 1785 and 1789, he set about building a country mansion modelled upon Government House in Bombay. There is a memorial window to William Hornby in St Peter's Church in Titchfield. The parkland, laid out as a setting for the mansion, resulted in the removal of what remained of the medieval hamlet. The work also involved the diversion of existing local roads and the construction of a sea wall across the creek, reducing the former inlet to a small stream. At the time the mansion was built there was no bridge across the fleet at Newtown as there is today, and access to the estate was from Titchfield via Abshot and Hook Park Road.

William Hornby died in 1803 and ownership of the estate passed to his son John. When John Hornby died in 1832 ownership passed on to his son, William. It was William Hornby, the grandson of Governor Hornby, who constructed the estate buildings which form the industrial hamlet at Hook. These comprised a Blacksmiths House, Smithy and four workers cottages to serve his estate. There is some evidence that the Wheelwrights House is of an earlier date although the shop adjoining was probably built (or rebuilt) at this time. The four cottages were probably built in 1846. Initially built to serve the estate, the smithy and wheelwright's shop gradually expanded to serve the much wider area of Warsash and Locks Heath, becoming a small industrial centre providing woodwork and ironwork for the district.

The mansion was destroyed by fire around midnight on the night of 17 July 1903. Only a group of listed buildings associated with the house, which lie to the west of the conservation area, survive as a reminder. These include the Georgian stable block, known as Golf House, the walled garden and the Orangery. A scatter of older cottages still survive on Hook Park Road, including a former schoolhouse, these mark the route to the old hamlet and the former Hook House. The industrial hamlet survives as a notable example of a group of Victorian estate buildings and its buildings form the core of the Hook Conservation Area.

== Modern times ==
The relationship between Hook and Warsash is reflected in the local names of Hook-with-Warsash school and Hook-with-Warsash nature reserve. Also Hook with Warsash Animal Sanctuary.

== Notable people of Hook ==
Alan Ball, Jr., a former England international footballer, was living in Hook at the time of his death in April 2007. He died, aged 61, at his house in the hamlet after suffering a heart attack when trying to control a bonfire which got out of control.
