= Swanwick Shore Strict Baptist Chapel =

Church in Hampshire, England

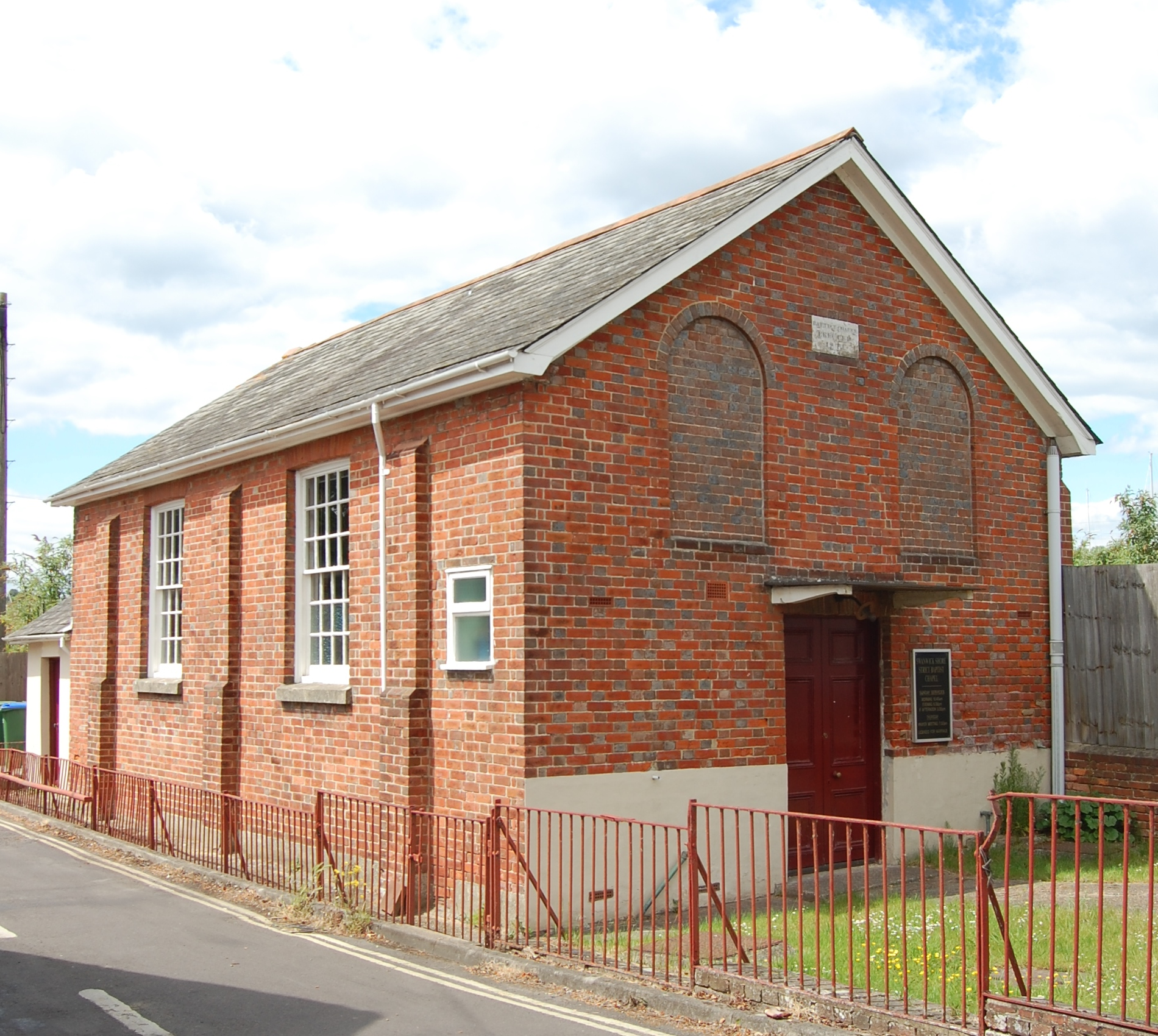
- The chapel from the east
- Swanwick Shore Strict Baptist Chapel
- 50°52′54″N 1°17′48″W
- OS grid reference: SU 49575 09353
- Location: 263 Bridge Road, Lower Swanwick, Hampshire SO31 7FN
- Country: England
- Denomination: Baptist
- Churchmanship: Strict Baptist

History
- Status: Chapel
- Founded: 1835
- Founder: George Harding

Architecture
- Functional status: Active
- Heritage designation: Grade II
- Designated: 26 September 2005
- Style: Vernacular
- Groundbreaking: 1844
- Completed: 1844

Swanwick Shore Strict Baptist Chapel is a Strict Baptist place of worship in Lower Swanwick, a village in the Borough of Fareham in Hampshire, England. It has been in continuous use for worship since 1844, when it succeeded a converted boat-shed which had become unsuitable. Worshippers had gathered there since 1835, led by a pastor who had previously attended a different chapel nearby and who continued to lead the congregation until his death in 1892. Historic England has listed the simple brick building at Grade II for its architectural and historical importance.

== History ==
In the early 19th century, Nonconformist Christians living in the Swanwick area of South Hampshire were provided for at an Independent (later Congregational) chapel which opened at nearby Sarisbury in 1803, several years after worshippers began meeting in local houses. George Harding, a regular attendee, sometimes ministered in the chapel, but after a few years it was temporarily closed. By the time it reopened, (Note: It was later rebuilt and is now known as Sarisbury Green United Reformed Church.) Harding's beliefs had changed and were more closely aligned with those of the Strict Baptist movement. He began to minister to people sympathetic to that cause, initially in houses and then from 1835 in a boat-shed he acquired and fitted out as a meeting house.

This wooden building was "not an ideal place": measuring 120 by 12 by 8 feet (36.6 m × 3.7 m × 2.4 m) and built entirely of wood, it often overheated, regularly flooded—especially at high tide on the River Hamble, a tidal river on which the shed stood—and soon became so popular as a place of worship that no more people could get in. In 1844, the building was condemned, and Harding arranged for a new permanent chapel to be built close to the site. John Moody, who owned the riverside boatyard where he founded Moody Yachts and where the old shed stood, assisted with this. It was completed the same year; the date is commemorated on a stone in the gable.

George Harding remained as pastor until his death in 1892. A vestry was built to the rear of the chapel in the 1870s, but few changes have taken place to the building since then apart from some small alterations in the late 20th century. The chapel was awarded Grade II listed status on 26 September 2005; this defines it as a "nationally important" building of "special interest". As of February 2001 it was one of 406 Grade II listed buildings, and 423 listed buildings of all grades, in the Borough of Fareham.

== Architecture ==
The chapel stands back slightly from Bridge Road (the A27), historically the main route between Southampton, Fareham and Portsmouth. Externally the building is very simple: of red and grey brick with a slate-tiled roof, it has a symmetrical east-facing façade with two large, slightly recessed, arched blind windows set below the gable and above a central doorway. Between the round-arched tops of the blank windows is a datestone (click for image) reading baptist chapel / erected / 1844. The bricks are laid in the Flemish bond pattern, and at the bottom there is a rendered plinth. The panelled double doors sit below a slate projection carried on plain brackets. The north and south elevations are similar: they have two sash windows set between projecting brick pilasters. The north face has a small additional window, a later addition. The vestry to the rear is, like the chapel itself, of one storey but is shorter; the walls are rendered, and there is a single sash window.

== See also ==
- List of places of worship in the Borough of Fareham
