= Hook, Hampshire =

Hook is the name of two places in the English county of Hampshire:

- Hook, Hart, near Basingstoke, a small town and civil parish
- Hook, Fareham, near Warsash, a hamlet
