= Albert Fielder =

English cricketer

Personal information
- Full name: Albert Edward Fielder
- Born: 29 April 1889; Sarisbury Green, Hampshire, England
- Died: 29 April 1947 (aged 58); Southampton, Hampshire, England
- Batting: Right-handed
- Bowling: Right-arm fast-medium

Domestic team information
- Years: Team
- 1911–1913: Hampshire

Career statistics
Competition	First-class
Matches	3
Runs scored	38
Batting average	12.66
100s/50s	–/–
Top score	35
Balls bowled	266
Wickets	6
Bowling average	37.50
5 wickets in innings	1
10 wickets in match	–
Best bowling	5/128
Catches/stumpings	4/–
- Source: Cricinfo, 11 January 2010

Albert Edward Fielder (3 April 1889 – 29 April 1947) was an English first-class cricketer.

Fielder was born at Sarisbury Green in April 1899. He was noted in Cricket as being "a player of considerable promise", making his debut in first-class cricket for Hampshire against Surrey at The Oval in the 1911 County Championship. His debut was a success, with Fielder taking figures of 5 for 128 in Surrey's first innings. In his following match against Gloucestershire at Bristol, he put on 147 for the tenth wicket with Edward Sprot (125 not out); Fielder was eventually dismissed for 35 by George Dennett. Following this innings, Cricket described him "a batsman of some nerve and ability". Despite his perceived promise, Fielder would make one further first-class appearance for Hampshire, against Leicestershire at Southampton. In his three first-class matches, he took 6 wickets at an average of 37.50. As a lower order batsman, he scored 38 runs at a batting average of 12.66. Fielder died at Southampton in April 1947.
