= Hamble Valley =

UK Parliament constituency (since 2024)

Coordinates: 50.88°N 1.28°W

- County constituency for the House of Commons
- Interactive map of boundaries since 2024
- Boundary of Hamble Valley in South East England
- County: Hampshire
- Electorate: 76,902 (2023)
- Major settlements: Hamble-le-Rice; Hedge End; Netley; Titchfield; Whiteley

Current constituency
- Created: 2024
- Member of Parliament: Paul Holmes (Conservative)
- Seats: One
- Created from: Eastleigh; Fareham; Meon Valley

Hamble Valley is a parliamentary constituency in the House of Commons of the UK Parliament. Following the completion of the 2023 periodic review of Westminster constituencies, it was first contested in the 2024 general election. It is represented by Paul Holmes of the Conservative Party, who served as the MP for Eastleigh from 2019 to 2024.

== Constituency profile ==
Hamble Valley is a mostly suburban constituency located in Hampshire. It forms part of the South Hampshire conurbation and contains towns and villages lying between the cities of Southampton and Portsmouth. The constituency covers the town of Hedge End, the large residential area containing Park Gate, Locks Heath and Sarisbury and the villages of Bursledon, Netley, Hamble-le-Rice, Botley, Warsash, Whiteley and Titchfield. The constituency is generally affluent, with much of it falling within the top 10% least-deprived areas in England. House prices in the constituency are higher than the national average.

Compared to the rest of the country, residents of Hamble Valley are older, well-educated and have high levels of household income. They are likely to be homeowners and to work in professional occupations. White people made up 95% of the population at the 2021 census. At the local council level, the areas west of the River Hamble (Hedge End, Bursledon, Netley and Hamble-le-Rice) are represented by Liberal Democrats whilst the rest of the constituency east of the river elected Conservatives. An estimated 51% of voters in Hamble Valley supported leaving the European Union in the 2016 referendum, a similar proportion to the country as a whole.

== Boundaries ==
Under the 2023 periodic review of Westminster constituencies, the constituency was defined as comprising the following areaa as they existed on 1 December 2020:

- The Borough of Eastleigh wards of Botley, Bursledon & Hound North, Hamble & Netley, Hedge End North, and Hedge End South.
- The Borough of Fareham wards of Locks Heath, Park Gate, Sarisbury, Titchfield, Titchfield Common, and Warsash.
- The City of Winchester ward of Whiteley & Shedfield.

Following a local government boundary review in Fareham, which became effective in May 2024, the constituency now comprises the following areas with effect from the 2024 general election:

- The Borough of Eastleigh wards of: Botley; Bursledon & Hound North; Hamble & Netley; Hedge End North; Hedge End South.
- The Borough of Fareham wards of: Avenue (part); Hook-with-Warsash; Locks Heath; Park Gate; Sarisbury & Whiteley; Titchfield (most); Titchfield Common; and a very small part of Stubbington ward.
- The City of Winchester ward of Whiteley & Shedfield.

The seat straddles the River Hamble estuary and covers the following areas:

- Southern parts of the Borough of Eastleigh, including the communities of Hedge End, Botley, Netley, and Hamble-le-Rice, transferred from the constituency of Eastleigh
- Western suburbs of the Borough of Fareham, comprising the villages of Locks Heath, Park Gate, Sarisbury, Titchfield, and Warsash, transferred from the constituency of Fareham (which was renamed Fareham and Waterlooville)
- The City of Winchester ward of Whiteley and Shedfield, transferred from Meon Valley (which was abolished)

== Members of Parliament ==
Eastleigh and Fareham before 2024

Election	Member	Party
2024	Paul Holmes	Conservative

== Elections ==
=== Elections in the 2020s ===
General election 2024: Hamble Valley
Party	Candidate	Votes	%	±%
Conservative	Paul Holmes	19,671	36.4	−25.8
Liberal Democrats	Prad Bains	14,869	27.5	+6.4
Labour	Devina Paul	8,753	16.2	+2.6
Reform UK	Caroline Gladwin	8,216	15.2	N/A
Green	Kate Needham	2,310	4.3	+1.2
Hampshire Ind.	Binka Griffin	185	0.3	N/A
Majority		4,802	8.9	−32.3
Turnout		54,004	67.1	−7.1
Registered electors		80,537		
Conservative hold		Swing	−16.1	

=== Elections in the 2010s ===
2019 notional result
Party	Vote	%
Conservative	35,497	62.2
Liberal Democrats	12,009	21.1
Labour	7,739	13.6
Green	1,796	3.1
Turnout	57,041	74.2
Electorate	76,902	

== See also ==
- List of parliamentary constituencies in Hampshire
- List of parliamentary constituencies in the South East England (region)
