= Park Gate =

Village in Hampshire, England

Coordinates: 50.864°N 1.258°W

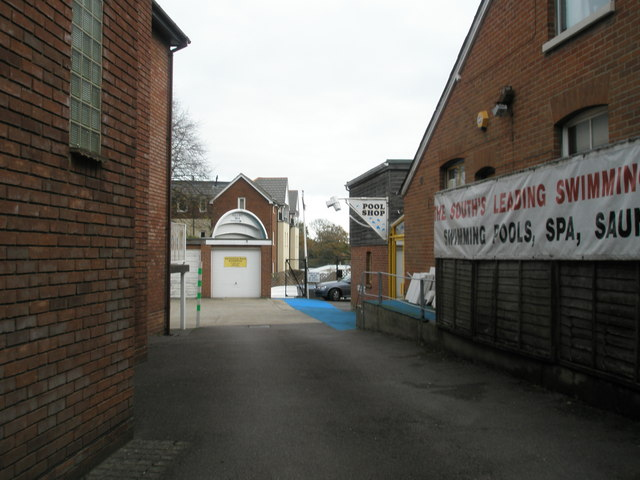
- Pool shop

- Location within Hampshire
- Area: 1.139 sq mi (2.95 km^{2})
- Population: 7,811
  - Density: 6,858/sq mi (2,648/km^{2})
- OS grid reference: SU5108
- District: Fareham
- Shire county: Hampshire
- Region: South East
- Country: England
- Sovereign state: United Kingdom
- Post town: Southampton
- Postcode district: SO31
- Dialling code: 01489
- Police: Hampshire and Isle of Wight
- Fire: Hampshire and Isle of Wight
- Ambulance: South Central
- UK Parliament: Hamble Valley

Park Gate is a village in the Fareham district in Hampshire, England. It borders Locks Heath to the south, Segensworth to the east and Sarisbury to the west. Park Gate has two churches, Duncan Road Church and St Margaret Mary R.C. It also has three takeaway shops.

== History ==
Park Gate was developed around Swanwick railway station and was a distribution hub for local strawberries that were grown in the area. In 1913, at the peak of strawberry production, more than 3,000 tons of strawberries were sent from local fields every week to be distributed from the station. Strawberry distribution stopped in 1966, however, the railway station remains, and even though fruit and vegetables are still grown in the area, the present landscape is dominated by housing. The Station Master's House adjacent to the railway station has since become a restaurant.

In 1944, Park Gate played host to convoys of Canadian soldiers and tanks who were stationed along Botley Road adjacent to Fair View Terrace, waiting for their orders for the Normandy D-Day landings. During this time, there was an account of a V1 rocket landing in the Duncan Road area, causing some of the Canadian ammunition trucks to catch fire and explode.

In the late 1980s, Park Gate along with neighbouring Locks Heath, became a growth sector for southern Hampshire with modern businesses moving to nearby Segensworth. With Junction 9 of the M27 within easy reach, Park Gate has become a base for commuting East to Portsmouth, West to Southampton and North to Winchester, Andover and Basingstoke.

== Gallery ==
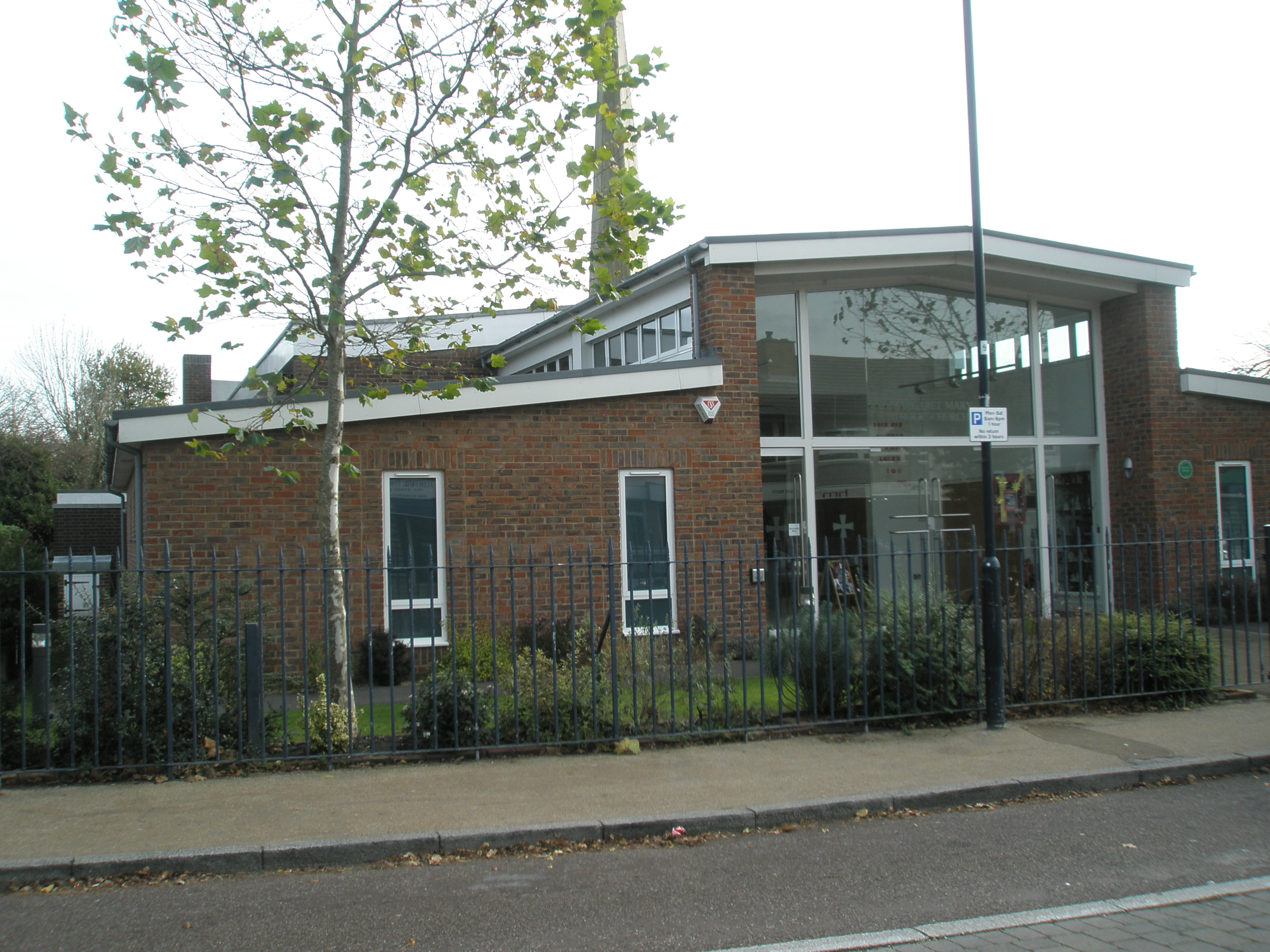
St Margaret Mary R.C. Church, Middle Road

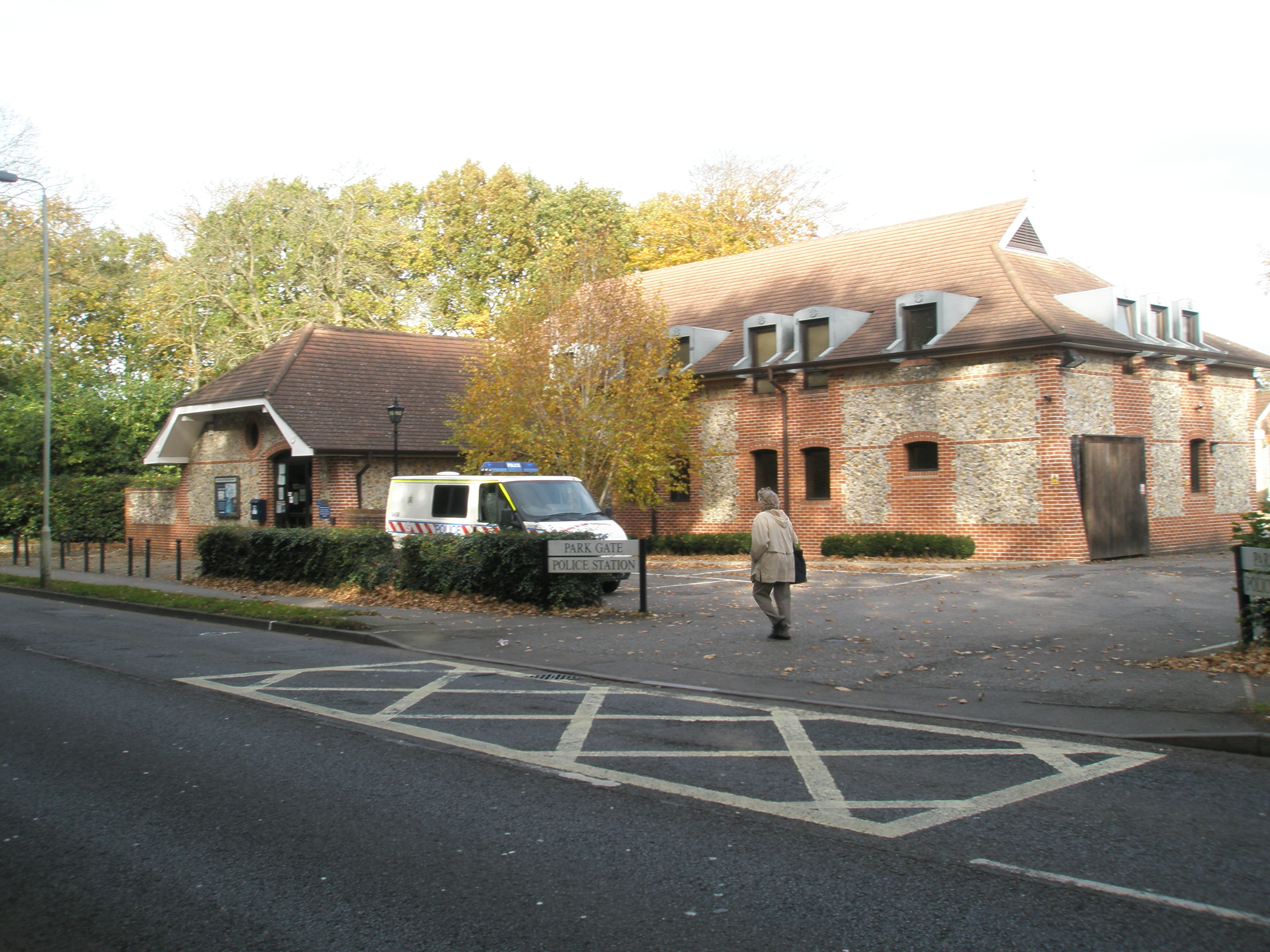
Park Gate Police Station

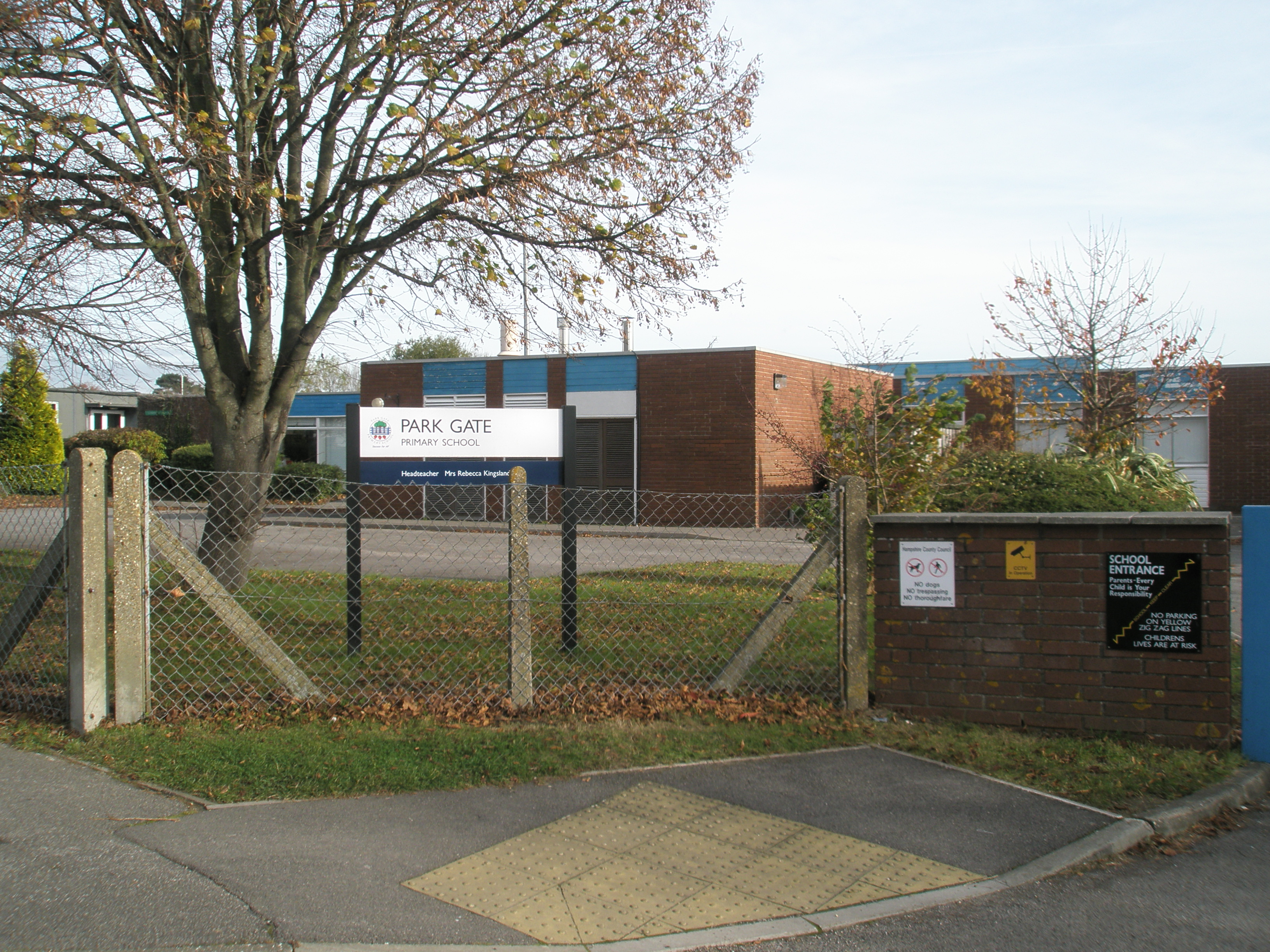
Park Gate Primary School

== See also ==
- List of places of worship in the Borough of Fareham
