= Swanwick railway station =

Railway station in Hampshire, England

Coordinates: 50.875656°N 1.265852°W

Swanwick
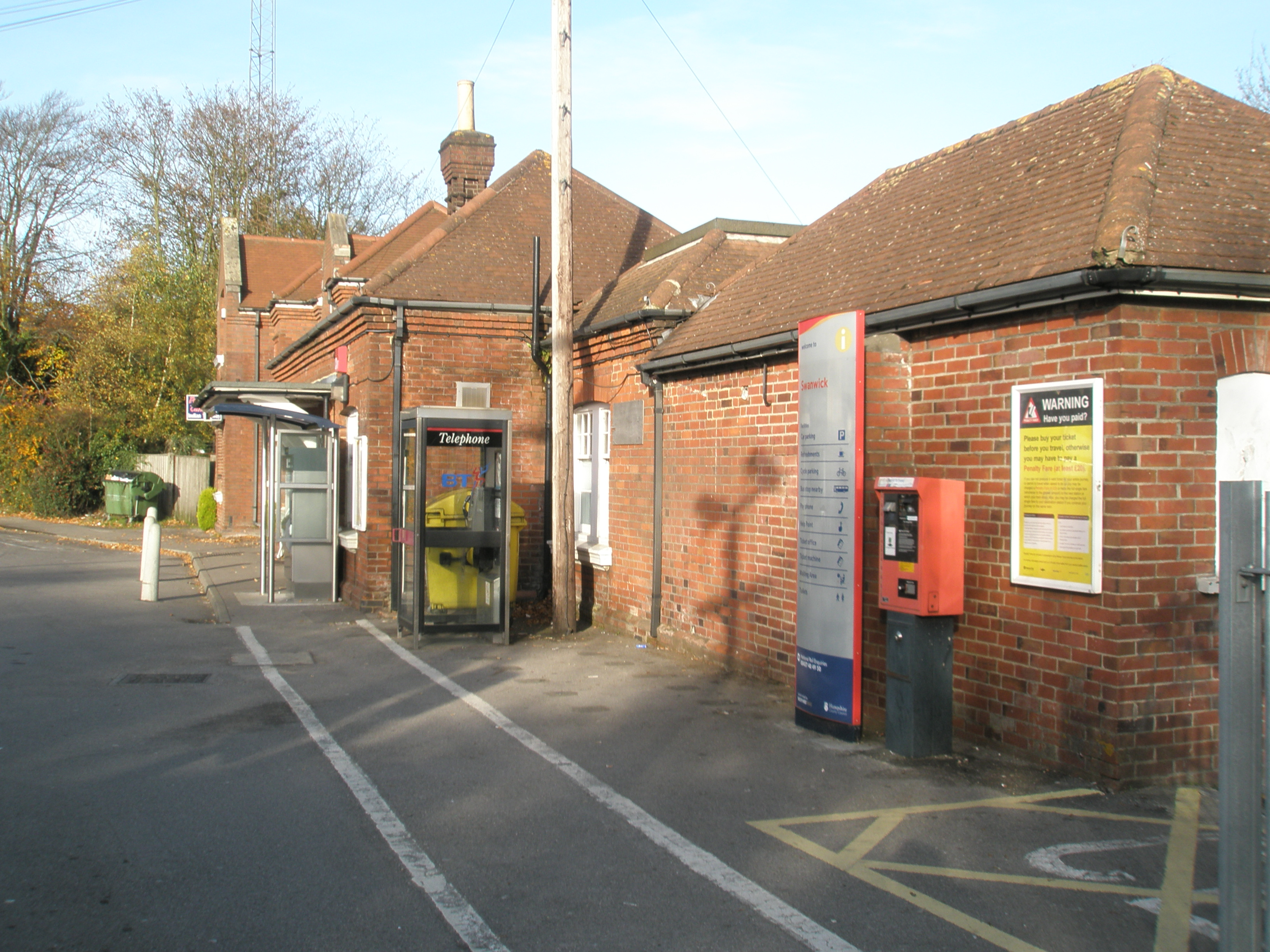

General information
- Location: Park Gate, Fareham; England
- Grid reference: SU517087
- Managed by: South Western Railway
- Platforms: 2

Other information
- Station code: SNW
- Classification: DfT category E

History
- Opened: 2 September 1889
- Original company: London and South Western Railway
- Pre-grouping: London and South Western Railway
- Post-grouping: Southern Railway

Passengers
- 2020/21: ▼0.161 million
- 2021/22: ▲0.418 million
- 2022/23: ▲0.485 million
- 2023/24: ▲0.504 million
- 2024/25: ▲0.563 million
Location
Notes
- Passenger statistics from the Office of Rail and Road

Swanwick railway station is a railway station in Fareham, Hampshire, England. Despite its name, it is actually located in Park Gate, one mile south of Swanwick.

The station opened on 2 September 1889, and was specially built for the local strawberry industry. For a short time each year, it was one of the busiest stations in the country. The station is near a small industrial estate between the residential areas of Locks Heath and Whiteley.

== History ==
The railway line between Netley and Fareham was built by the London and South Western Railway; it was authorised on 20 August 1883, construction began in April 1886, and the line was opened on 2 September 1889. Swanwick was one of two intermediate stations originally provided, but unlike its neighbour Bursledon, it was provided with a crossing loop so that two trains could pass each other on the single-track route. The local area's strawberry industry provided up to 7,000 tons each year in the late 1800s. During the harvest, Swanwick Station became one of the busiest in the country with "Strawberry Specials" heading to Covent Garden and across the country. Long platforms were constructed to accommodate the trains.

After the Second World War, the station was mainly used for passenger services.

== Services ==
Services at Swanwick are operated by Southern and South Western Railway using Class 377 and 450 EMUs.

The typical off-peak service in trains per hour is:

- 2 tph to Brighton via Worthing
- 1 tph to Portsmouth & Southsea
- 3 tph to Southampton Central (1 calls at all stations and 2 call at Woolston only)

On Sundays, the services between Southampton Central and Brighton via Worthing are reduced to hourly, and these services also run non-stop to Southampton Central.

Preceding station	National Rail	Following station
Fareham	South Western Railway West Coastway Line	Bursledon
Fareham	Southern West Coastway line	Woolston
Fareham	Southern West Coastway line	Netley Limited service

== Facilities ==
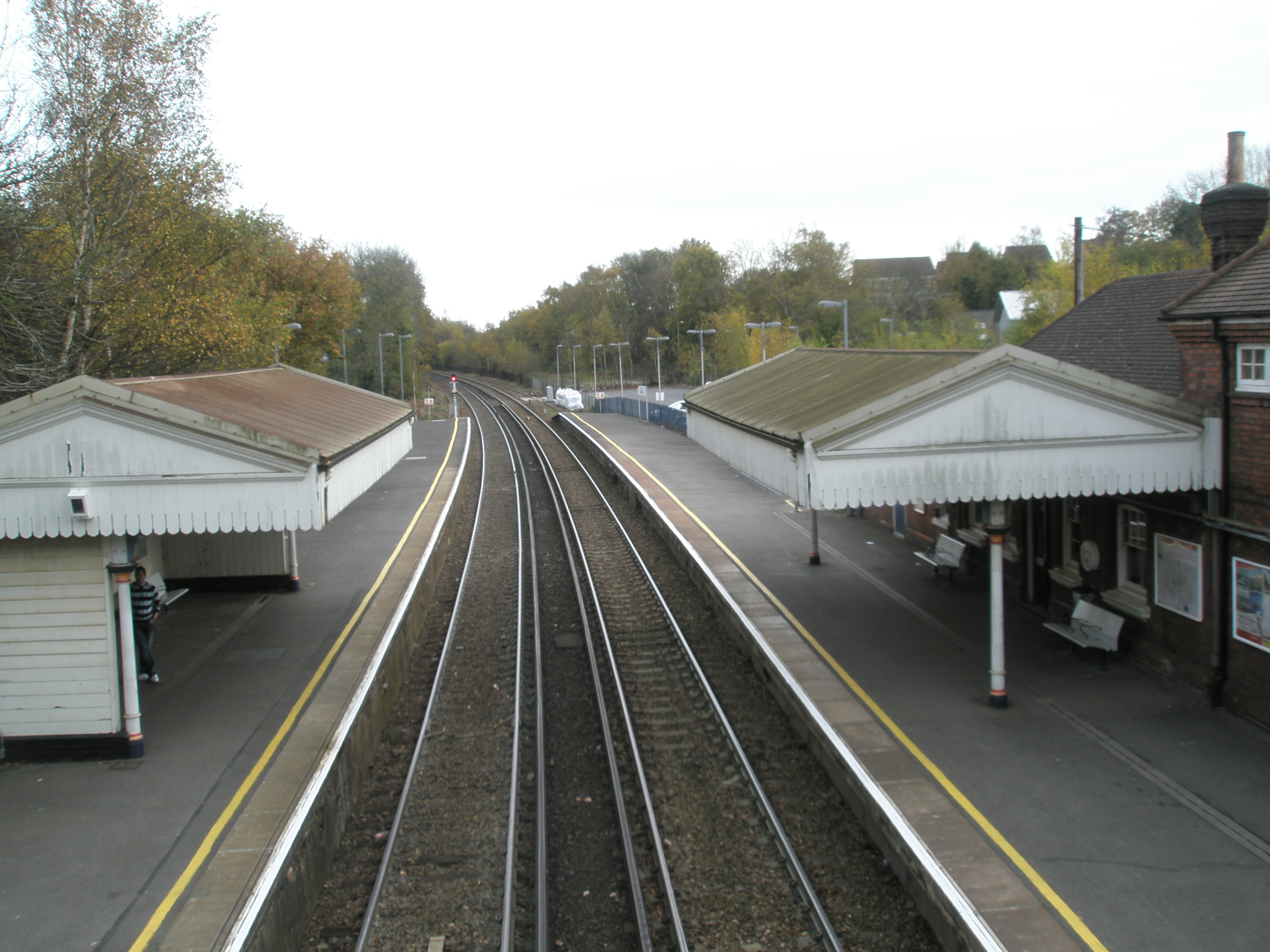
Swanwick Station from the footbridge looking east towards Fareham. The ticket office is on the right and the car park can be seen in the centre background

The station is by far the busiest between Fareham and Southampton and has more facilities than most on the line. The ticket office is open between 6am and 6:15pm weekdays (shorter hours at the weekend). Toilet facilities and a waiting room are within the ticket office area (not available when the ticket office is closed).

The station is covered by CCTV, as is the cycle shed and car park next to the station. There are customer help points and covered areas on both platforms. Disabled customers cannot gain access to the Fareham-bound platform.

Outside the station in the forecourt there is a taxi rank and a refreshment caravan. The Park Gate Tandoori restaurant is located in the former station master's house which forms part of the station building.
