= Sarisbury =

Village and parish in Hampshire, England

Coordinates: 50.873°N 1.288°W

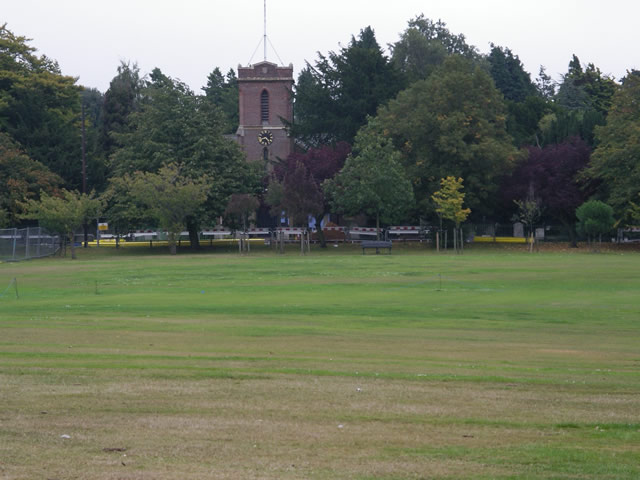
- Sarisbury Green and St Paul's Church

- Location within Hampshire
- Area: 2.98 sq mi (7.7 km^{2})
- Population: 7,385
  - Density: 2,478/sq mi (957/km^{2})
- District: Fareham
- Shire county: Hampshire
- Region: South East
- Country: England
- Sovereign state: United Kingdom
- UK Parliament: Hamble Valley

Sarisbury is a village to the west of Park Gate within the borough of Fareham, Hampshire, in the south of England. Its focal point is Sarisbury Green (the two names are interchangeable) and the parish church of St Paul, formerly part of Titchfield parish. In previous times it was a rural locality dependent on fruit growing. At the 2011 Census the population of the ward was 7,385. Nearby villages include Bursledon, Hamble-le-Rice and Swanwick.

== History ==
In 1837, Sarisbury, formerly in Titchfield ecclesiastical parish. However, in 1868, Sarisbury was still being described as a chapelry in the parish of Titchfield, so the establishment date of the parish is unclear. On 30 September 1894 Sarisbury became a separate civil parish, on 1 April 1932 the parish was abolished and merged with Fareham, part also went to form Curbridge. In 1931 the parish had a population of 4338. It is now in the unparished area of Fareham.

Sarisbury Green originated as a tongue of land at the extremity of Titchfield Common which was left when the rest was enclosed.

The surrounding area used to be the main provider of strawberries to the whole of the UK. Additionally there used to be apple orchards along the side of the main road through the village, Bridge Road.

The radiobiologist Tikvah Alper died in Sarisbury in 1995.

== Sport ==
A village with two traditional cricket greens, Sarisbury Green is also the home of Holly Hill Country Park. The cricket greens are used by Sarisbury Athletic Cricket Club. One pitch is opposite the One Stop convenience store on Bridge Road and the other is next to the junior school on Allotment Road. The one on Bridge Road, "The Green" is used by a variety of teams on Sundays and on Saturdays by Locks Heath 3rd XI and Sarisbury Athletic 3rd XI. Sarisbury U-15s also play there. Allotment Road pitch, "The Hollow" is Sarisbury Athletic's main ground where they have their own club house. Adjacent to "The Green" is a set of two tennis courts, the Sarisbury Parish Rooms and the village Community Centre.

== Education ==
The village is home to an infant and corresponding junior school, namely Sarisbury Infant School (for 4-7 year olds) and Sarisbury Church of England Controlled Junior School (for 7-11 year olds) as well as a secondary school, Brookfield Community School. Many pupils start at the infant school at the age of 4, move to the junior school at the age of 7, and continue all the way to GCSE level at the age of 16 at Brookfield School.

== Worship ==
The village has two Christian churches: St Paul's Church of England Church, originally a district church of Titchfield Parish, built in 1836 to a design by Jacob Owen, and a United Reformed Church. Holly Hill Cemetery is nearby.

== Events ==
Every June the village holds a Fayre on the Green, home to the "Swanwick Rollercoaster" and many other attractions, occasionally including a pair of llamas.

== Transport ==
A bus route from Southampton to Gosport serves the village, stopping at the three bus stops. Trains on the West Coastway Line serve the two nearby railway stations of Swanwick and Bursledon.

== Notable people ==
- Albert Fielder (1889–1947), cricketer
- Laurel (born 1994), musician
- Joshua Spencer-Smith (1843–1928), cricketer
- Orlando Spencer-Smith (1843–1920), cricketer

== See also ==
- List of places of worship in the Borough of Fareham
