= Whiteley =

Residential area in South Hampshire, England

Coordinates: 50.8809°N 1.2665°W

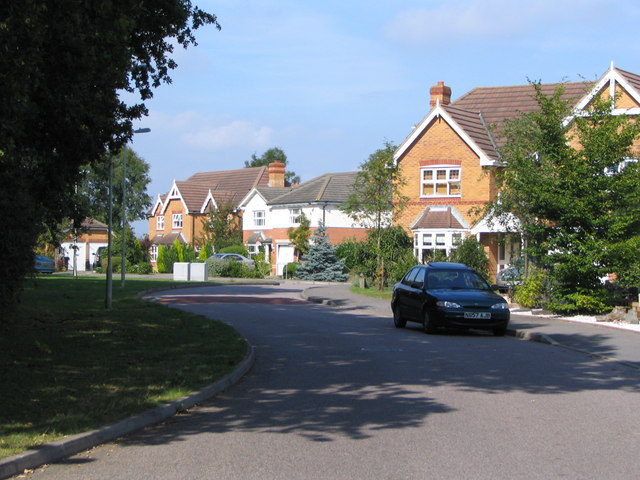
- Bader Way

- Location within Hampshire
- Population: 10,000 (2011 Census)
- OS grid reference: SU517093
- District: Borough of Fareham; City of Winchester
- Shire county: Hampshire
- Region: South East
- Country: England
- Sovereign state: United Kingdom
- Post town: FAREHAM
- Postcode district: PO15 or SO30
- Dialling code: 01489 or 01329
- Police: Hampshire and Isle of Wight
- Fire: Hampshire and Isle of Wight
- Ambulance: South Central
- UK Parliament: Hamble Valley

Whiteley is a planned community of 6,500 homes in the county of Hampshire, England, United Kingdom near Fareham. The development straddles the boundary between two council districts: the Borough of Fareham to the south and west, and the City of Winchester to the north and east.

== Location ==
Whiteley is located in southern Hampshire between the cities of Portsmouth and Southampton and close to the market town of Fareham. The development is situated close to Junction 9 of the M27 motorway. Rail services are provided from Swanwick railway station to the south - services between London Victoria/Portsmouth and Southampton via Hamble, or Botley railway station to the north - services between London Waterloo and Portsmouth via Eastleigh. Cycle tracks interconnect the town with the two stations. First Bus 28/28a connects to Swanwick and on to Fareham Bus Station, whilst Bluestar 26 connects to Botley and on to Southampton Bus Station.

== History ==
Historically, the site now occupied by Whiteley was farmland and coppice. The nearest historical settlements are those of Park Gate situated just south of Swanwick Hill, Little Park to the South, Swanwick to the West, Botley and Curdridge to the North.

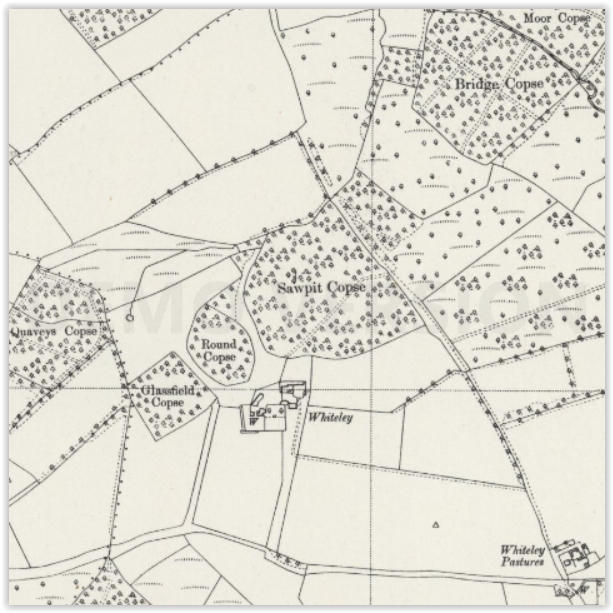
Whiteley Farm and nearby Copses (1946)

Farm land taken over by the initial development included Rookery, Yew Tree, Sweethills and Whiteley. North Whiteley development was based on land released by Bury, Bridge and Barn Farms. Barn Farmhouse which remains in North Whiteley is listed by Historic England as a C17 timber frame house with a C18 extension.

The wooded areas in Whiteley were used to provide shelter to troops in the build-up of forces for transportation to northern France in preparation for D-Day during the second world war. This is evidenced by the remains of a War Department water tank on the edge of the Bere Forest to the north of the community.

Part of the M27 motorway constructed to the south of the development was opened in February 1978.

In the early 1980s Hampshire County Council developed draft proposals for land north of what was then known as the western wards of Fareham. The new community was to be known as Whiteley after the name of the farm that lay in the centre of the development area. This development comprised 3,300 houses 16,500 m2 of offices and 7,500 m2 of retail, plus a community centre and a junior school.

Construction of the Solent business park started in the mid-1980s and the first houses were completed in the late 1980s, although construction slowed for a few years following a crash in the British residential property market during the mid-1990s. From 1996 construction recommenced, but has been paused since 2020 (covid epidemic).

One of the earliest buildings in Whiteley was the Solent Hotel and Spa which was constructed in the early 1990s.

In September 2007, British Land announced plans to spend upwards of £100m redeveloping Whiteley Village and reconstructing it as a district centre, while also adding housing and a hotel to the area.

The Whiteley village Outlet was demolished in Autumn 2011 (finishing by November 2011), with the exception of the medium-sized Tesco supermarket.

The new development was opened in 2014.

In July 2018 Winchester District Council approved an outline planning application for a further development, North Whiteley consisting of 3,500 residences with provision for two primary schools and a secondary school, plus three new routes linking Whiteley to Botley Road. This development should be largely complete by 2027.

The part of the development which falls in the Winchester district became a civil parish in 2003.

Whiteley was recognised as a Parish in Portsmouth Diocese in 2021. Hope Church Whiteley began as the town first became established about 25 years ago, within people's homes. It moved to the Community Centre in Gull Coppice before, in 2021, it moved to its new building at Cornerstone School. It is a multicultural, inter-generational church.

== Whiteley today ==
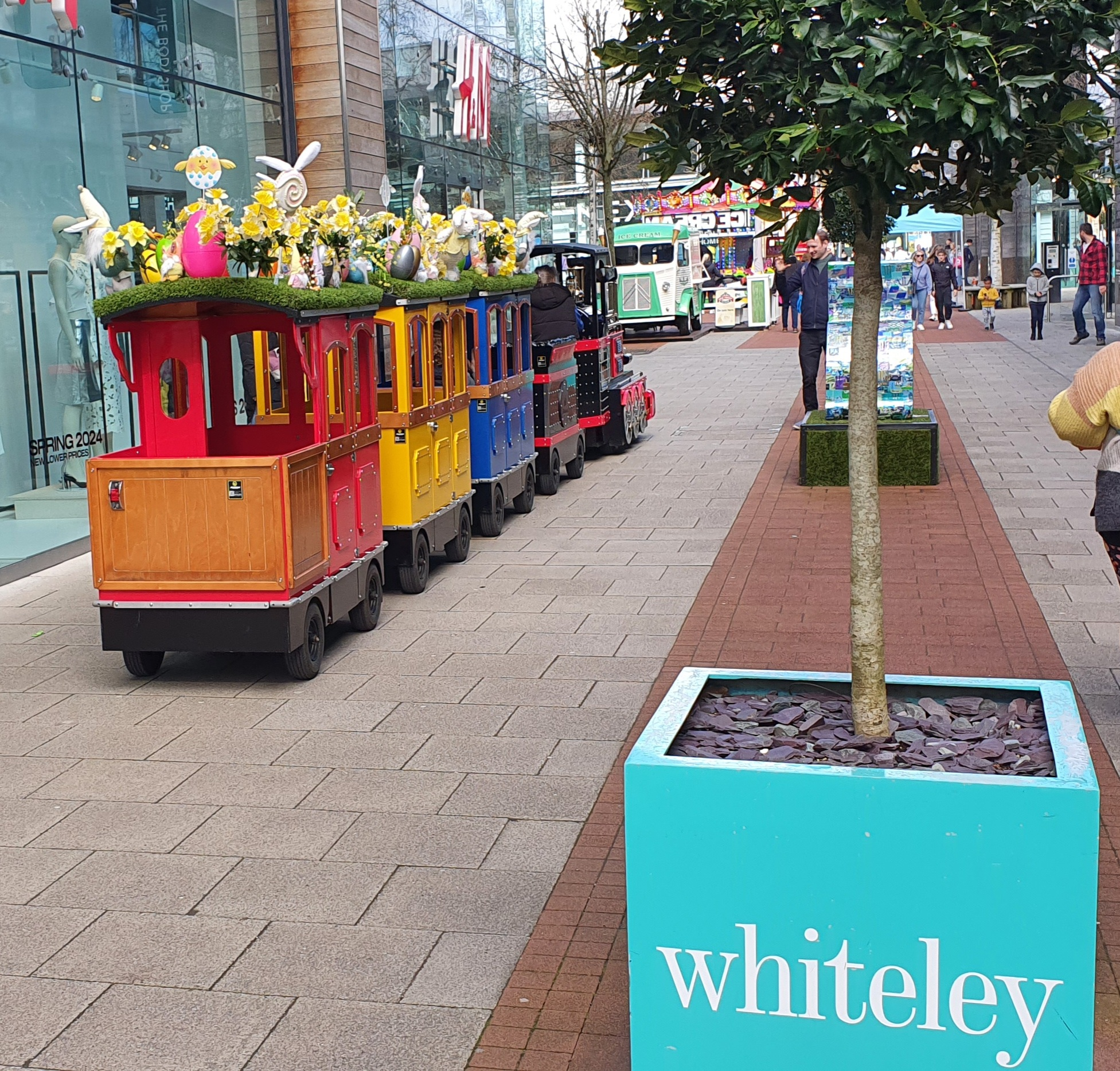
Whiteley children's train at Easter

Apart from the residential areas, which house around 10,000 residents, the main focus is the Whiteley Shopping Centre, an open-air pedestrianised mall (not to be confused with 'Whiteley Village' in Walton-on-Thames). Stores include Marks & Spencer, Next plc, Boots, WH Smith and many other common High Street names but there are also other units that were specifically earmarked for local enterprises. Parking is available for 1500 vehicles and is free for the first 4 hours and after 6pm. In 2015 a new leisure complex adjacent to Whiteley Shopping opened, providing a nine-screen cinema and a further five restaurants.

Whiteley also contains the Solent Business Park which consists of a number of large companies, including Zurich Financial Services, the new headquarters for NATS (formerly National Air Traffic Services) and the offices and studios of ITV Meridian.

== Whiteley New Town Issues ==
• The town started with a business park, a hotel and an outlet centre spurred off junction 9 of the M27. The single entrance and exit road resulted in start and end of day traffic jams. A lengthy set of traffic mitigation schemes has been implemented, but the resultant roadworks lasted over 10 years, finally completing in 2026.

• The new development includes a set of roads (Bluebell, Curbridge and Whiteley Way) which are designed as 30mph through routes to Botley Road A3051. The roads are owned by the housing development companies of North Whiteley, which results in enforcement issues, as they are not yet roads adopted and managed by Hampshire County Council.

• The continued development of properties in North Whiteley and resultant groundworks results in noise, dust, mud and traffic. The contractors utilise road cleaning vehicles to mitigate the dust, but with limited success.

Whiteley Gardens Dust Cloud Summer 2026

• Management of parts of communal spaces was allocated to management companies by the developers. Local residents need to monitor and control the fees charged by these management companies.

• Secondary school children need to commute to The Henry Cort Community College (1 hour walking distance). Hampshire's application to build a new secondary school within Whiteley Town was approved and building commenced in 2025. For an adjustment period pupils based south of the M27 will be bused to the new location, to be titled Whiteley Secondary School.

• In 2026 Cornerstone Primary School reached capacity, so primary schoolchildren will be transported to nearby parishes. A second new primary, has not reached planning permission so this will continue as an issue for the next few years.

• The new build has threatened to displace local species. Mitigation efforts such as Bat Boxes, Hedgehog houses and Bird Boxes were implemented by the developers, as required by Winchester District Council. These biodiverse green spaces will be maintained in the long term by the Town Council once handed over.

== Whiteley Copses and Woodland ==
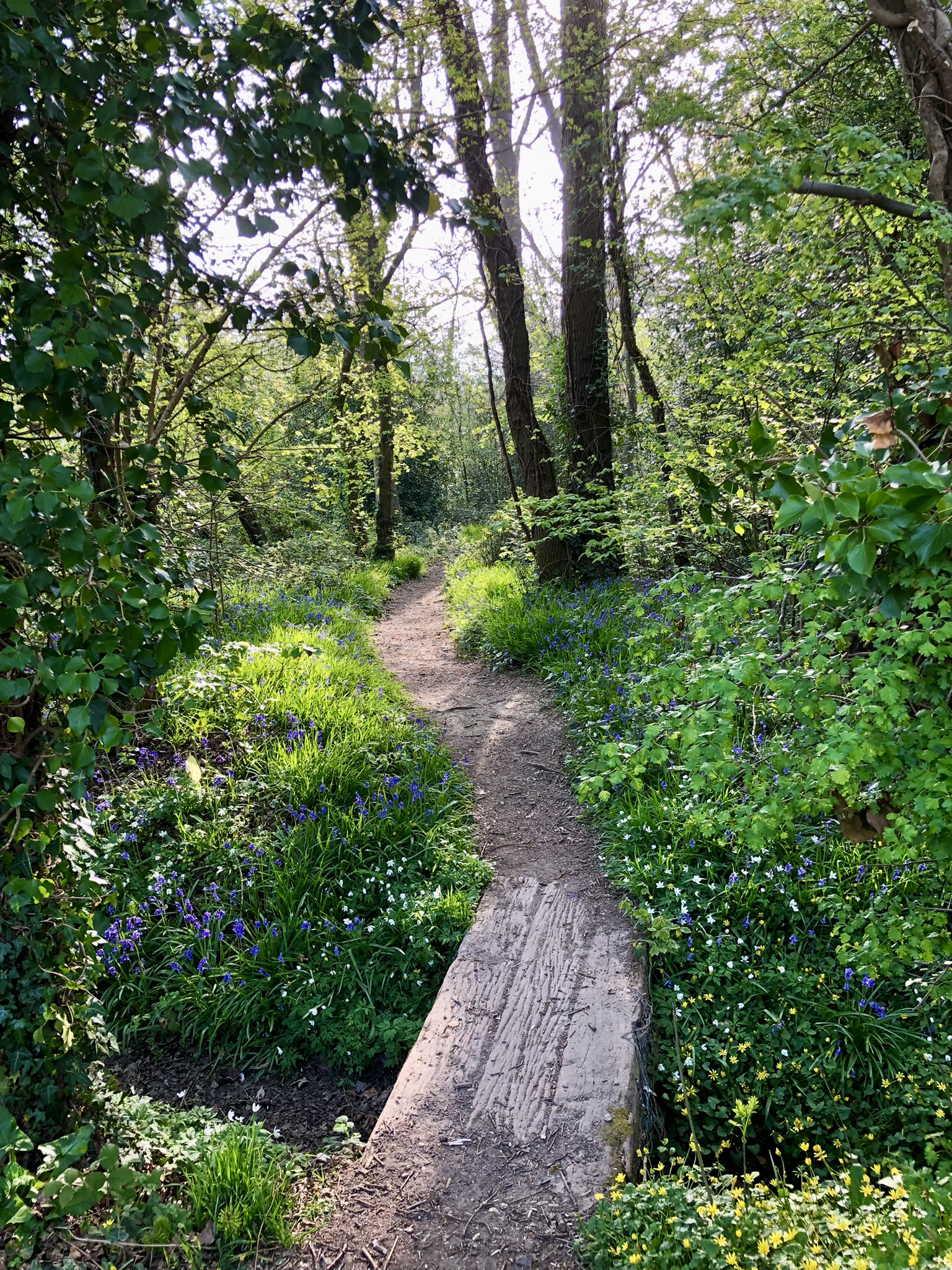
Whiteley_Woodlands

Whiteley is bordered on the East by public woodlands managed by Forestry England, leading up to Botley Wood and Everett's and Mushes Copses. Botley Wood is run by Hampshire County Council.

The town is constructed around a number of smaller woodland copses and coppices. These include: Round Coppice between Solent Hotel and Village Centre; Hill Coppice between Business Park and M27; Coldland Copse south of Ridge Lane; Coldland Meadow north of Barn Owl Close; Suttons Copse west of Ridge Lane; Bedlams Copse between Ridge Lane and Bluebell Way; Hangman's Copse between Bluebell Way and Botley Road; Quavey's Copse south west of Bluebell Way; Glassfield Copse west of Bluebell Way; Round Copse north of Bluebell Way; Sawpit Copse between Bluebell Way and Whiteley Way; Bushy Land inside Sweethill Crescent; Gull Coppice between Yew Tree Drive and Meadowside, and Yew Tree Woodland Park south of Yew Tree Drive.

== Demographics ==
The development has an overwhelmingly young population (79% under 44 years), white (96.95%), home-owning (87.23%) population of professionals and aspirational skilled workers (80% in social grade AB and C1). Whiteley is reported by the local health authority to have a higher than average rate of divorce and separation (11% versus 6% nationally).
