= Borough of Fareham =

Coordinates: 50.8542°N 1.1755°W

- Non-metropolitan district and borough
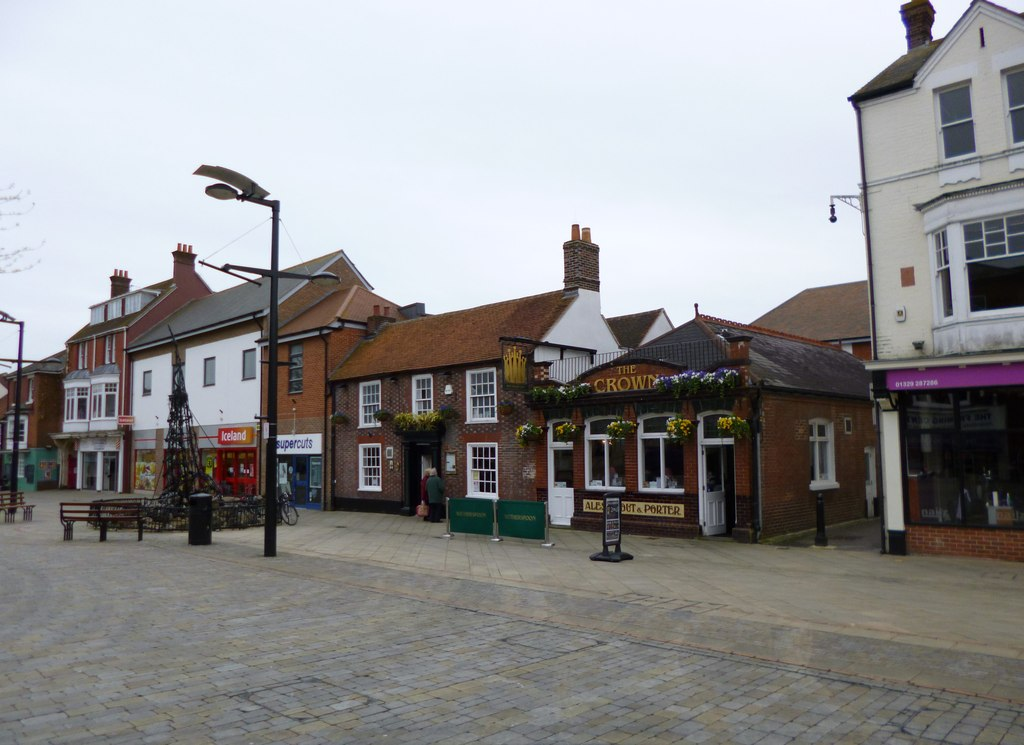
- Fareham town centre

- Fareham shown within Hampshire
- Sovereign state: United Kingdom
- Constituent country: England
- Region: South East England
- Non-metropolitan county: Hampshire
- Status: Non-metropolitan district
- Admin HQ: Fareham
- Incorporated: 1 April 1974

Government
  - Type: Non-metropolitan district council
  - Body: Fareham Borough Council
  - Leadership: Leader & Cabinet (Conservative)
  - MPs: Paul Holmes; Suella Braverman

Area
  - Total: 28.6 sq mi (74.2 km^{2})
  - Rank: 224th (of 296)

Population (2024)
  - Total: 115,428
  - Rank: 214th (of 296)
  - Density: 4,030/sq mi (1,560/km^{2})

Ethnicity (2021)
  - Ethnic groups: List: 95.6% White; 1.8% Asian; 1.5% Mixed; 0.6% Black; 0.4% other

Religion (2021)
  - Religion: List: 49.1% Christianity; 43.7% no religion; 5.4% not stated; 0.6% Islam; 0.4% other; 0.4% Hinduism; 0.3% Buddhism; 0.1% Sikhism; 0.1% Judaism
- Time zone: UTC0 (GMT)
  - Summer (DST): UTC+1 (BST)
- ONS code: 24UE (ONS); E07000087 (GSS)
- OS grid reference: SU5802906461
- Website: www.fareham.gov.uk

The Borough of Fareham is a local government district with borough status in Hampshire, England. Its council is based in Fareham. Other places within the borough include Portchester, Hill Head, Sarisbury, Stubbington, Titchfield and Warsash. The borough covers much of the semi-urban area between the cities of Southampton and Portsmouth, and is part of the South Hampshire conurbation. The neighbouring districts are Eastleigh, Winchester, Portsmouth and Gosport. The district's southern boundary is the coast of the Solent.

== History ==
The town of Fareham was governed by a local board of health from 1849. Such local boards were reconstituted as urban district councils in 1894. The parish and urban district of Fareham was significantly enlarged in 1932 when the neighbouring parishes of Crofton, Hook with Warsash, Portchester, Sarisbury and Titchfield were abolished.

Fareham Urban District was reconstituted as a non-metropolitan district on 1 April 1974 under the Local Government Act 1972. The reformed district was awarded borough status at the same time, allowing the chair of the council to take the title of mayor.

In March 2026, the government announced that it would abolish the borough in 2028 as part of local government reform across Hampshire. These proposals were withdrawn in September 2026.

== Governance ==
Fareham Borough Council

Type
- Type: Non-metropolitan district

Leadership
- Mayor: Tina Ellis, Conservative since 14 May 2026
- Leader: Simon Martin, Conservative since 16 May 2024
- Chief Executive: Andrew Wannell since 6 May 2023

Structure
- Seats: 32 councillors
- Political groups: Administration (22) Conservative (22) Other parties (10) Liberal Democrats (6) Labour (1) Reform (1) Independent (2)

Elections
- Last election: 7 May 2026

Meeting place
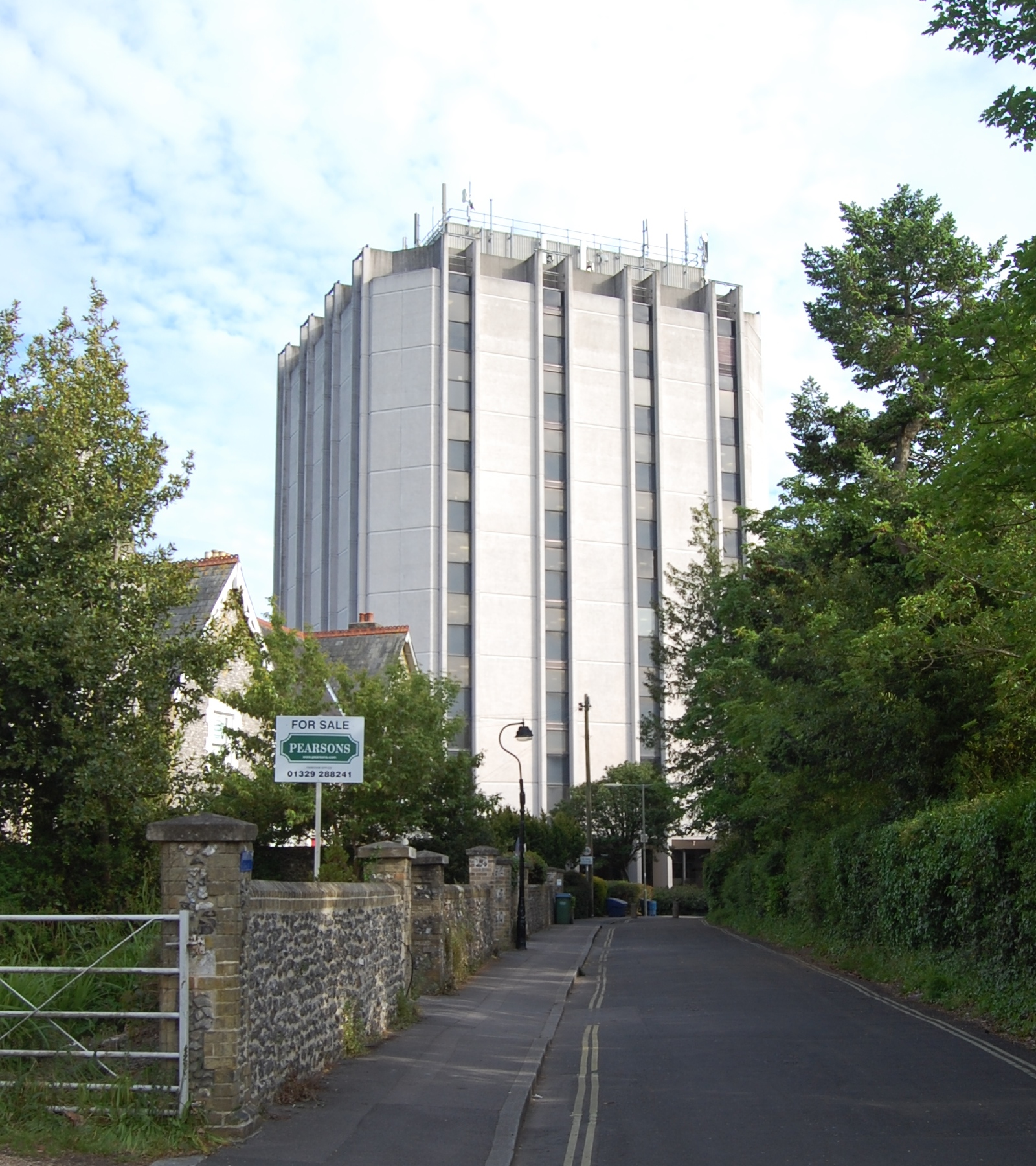
- Civic Offices, Civic Way, Fareham, PO16 7AZ

Website
- www.fareham.gov.uk

Fareham Borough Council provides district-level services. County-level services are provided by Hampshire County Council. There are no civil parishes in the borough, which is an unparished area.

=== Political control ===
The council has been under Conservative majority control since 1999.

Political control of the council since 1974 has been as follows:

Party in control	Years
No overall control	1974–1976
Conservative	1976–1986
No overall control	1986–1987
Conservative	1987–1994
No overall control	1994–1999
Conservative	1999–2026

=== Leadership ===
The role of mayor is largely ceremonial in Fareham. Political leadership is provided by the leader of the council. The leaders since 1995 have been:

Councillor	Party	From	To
Roger Price	Liberal Democrats	1995	1999
Seán Woodward	Conservative	1999	May 2024
Simon Martin	Conservative	16 May 2024	

=== Composition ===
Following the 2024 election and subsequent changes of allegiance up to July 2026, the composition of the council was:

Party	Seats
Conservative	22
Liberal Democrats	6
Labour	1
Reform	1
Independent	2
Total	32

=== Premises ===
The council is based at the Civic Offices on Civic Way in the centre of Fareham. The building was purpose-built for the council, being completed in 1975.

== Elections ==
Since the last boundary changes in 2024 the council has comprised 32 councillors representing 16 wards, with each ward electing two councillors. Elections are held in alternate years, with half the council (one councillor for each ward) elected each time to serve a four-year term of office.

== Freedom of the Borough ==
The following people and military units have received the Freedom of the Borough of Fareham.

=== Military Units ===
- HMS Collingwood, RN: 2 July 1974.

== See also ==
- List of places of worship in the Borough of Fareham
