= Fareham Borough Council elections =

Local government elections in Hampshire, England

Half of Fareham Borough Council in Hampshire, England is elected every two years, while before 2002 the council was elected by thirds. The boundary changes in 2002 saw 31 councillors elected from 15 wards. More recently, the boundary changes in 2024, councillor numbers increased from 31 to 32 being elected across 16 wards (2 councillors per ward).

== Council elections ==
- 1973 Fareham Borough Council election
- 1976 Fareham Borough Council election (New ward boundaries)
- 1979 Fareham Borough Council election
- 1980 Fareham Borough Council election
- 1982 Fareham Borough Council election
- 1983 Fareham Borough Council election
- 1984 Fareham Borough Council election
- 1986 Fareham Borough Council election
- 1987 Fareham Borough Council election
- 1988 Fareham Borough Council election
- 1990 Fareham Borough Council election
- 1991 Fareham Borough Council election
- 1992 Fareham Borough Council election
- 1994 Fareham Borough Council election
- 1995 Fareham Borough Council election
- 1996 Fareham Borough Council election
- 1998 Fareham Borough Council election
- 1999 Fareham Borough Council election
- 2000 Fareham Borough Council election
- 2002 Fareham Borough Council election (New ward boundaries reduced the number of seats by 11)
- 2004 Fareham Borough Council election
- 2006 Fareham Borough Council election
- 2008 Fareham Borough Council election
- 2010 Fareham Borough Council election
- 2012 Fareham Borough Council election
- 2014 Fareham Borough Council election
- 2016 Fareham Borough Council election
- 2018 Fareham Borough Council election
- 2021 Fareham Borough Council election
- 2022 Fareham Borough Council election
- 2024 Fareham Borough Council election (New ward boundaries)
- 2026 Fareham Borough Council election

== Borough result maps ==
2002 results map

2004 results map

2006 results map

2008 results map

2010 results map

2012 results map

2014 results map

2016 results map

2018 results map

2021 results map

2022 results map

2024 results map

2026 results map

== By-election results ==
=== 1998-2002 ===
Fareham West By-Election 15 July 1999
Party	Candidate	Votes	%	±%
Conservative		871	60.6	+23.8
Liberal Democrats		429	29.8	−20.4
Labour		138	9.6	−3.5
Majority		442	30.7	
Turnout		1,438		
Conservative gain from Liberal Democrats		Swing		

=== 2002-2006 ===
Fareham South By-Election 18 September 2003
Party	Candidate	Votes	%	±%
Conservative	Dennis Steadman	777	58.3	+27.2
Liberal Democrats	Eric Dunn	334	25.1	−15.2
Labour	James Carr	222	16.7	−11.8
Majority		443	33.2	
Turnout		1,333	24.7	
Conservative gain from Liberal Democrats		Swing		

=== 2010-2014 ===
Fareham West By-Election 9 December 2010
Party	Candidate	Votes	%	±%
Liberal Democrats	Nick Gregory	933	49.8	+28.9
Conservative	Stephen Day	687	36.7	−25.1
Labour	Michael Prior	124	6.6	−3.7
UKIP	Steve Richards	93	5.0	−2.0
Green	Peter Doggett	35	1.9	+1.9
Majority		246	13.1	
Turnout		1,872	35.0	
Liberal Democrats gain from Conservative		Swing		

Portchester East By-Election 15 March 2012
Party	Candidate	Votes	%	±%
Liberal Democrats	Geoff Fazackarley	1216	47.8	−9.5
Conservative	Alison Walker	840	33.0	+1.9
Labour	Richard Ryan	323	12.7	+1.1
Green	John Vivian	90	3.5	+3.5
Independent	Manny Martins	77	3.0	+3.0
Majority		376	14.77	
Turnout		2546		
Liberal Democrats hold		Swing		

=== 2014-2018 ===
Stubbington By-Election 9 November 2017
Party	Candidate	Votes	%	±%
Liberal Democrats	Jim Forrest	1185	55.2	+32.4
Conservative	Pal Hayre	769	35.8	+6.1
UKIP	Andy Annear	117	5.4	−38.0
Labour	Matthew Randall	76	3.5	−0.5
Majority		416		
Turnout		2147	39	
Liberal Democrats gain from UKIP		Swing		

=== 2022-2026 ===
Portchester East By-Election 20 October 2022
Party	Candidate	Votes	%	±%
Conservative	Harry Davis	957	37.6	−2.5
Liberal Democrats	Ciaran Urry-Tuttiett	932	36.6	−7.8
Labour	Dominic Martin	379	14.9	+3.5
Fareham Independent Group	Dave Wiltshire	275	10.8	+10.8
Majority		25	1.0	
Turnout		2,543	29	−11
Conservative gain from Liberal Democrats		Swing		

=== 2026-2030 ===
Portchester Wicor By-Election 19 November 2026
Party	Candidate	Votes	%	±%
Liberal Democrats	Steve Shaw	980	44.3	+11.2
Reform	Paul Kimber	618	28.0	−2.4
Conservative	Harry Davis	475	21.5	−8.0
Restore	George Ponsford	78	3.5	+3.5
Labour	Lorraine Drinkwater	59	2.7	+2.7
Majority		362	16.4	
Turnout		2,210		
Liberal Democrats hold		Swing		
