= 2022 Fareham Borough Council election =

2022 UK local government election

2022 Fareham Borough Council election results map

The 2022 Fareham Borough Council election took place on 5 May 2022 to elect members of Fareham Borough Council. This was on the same day as other local elections. 16 of the 31 seats were up for election.

== Background ==
Since its first election in 1973, Fareham has been under Conservative control, apart from periods of no overall control from 1973 to 1976, 1986 and 1987, and 1994 to 1999. The Liberal Democrats briefly overtook the Conservatives to become the largest party from 1994 to 1999. In the 2021 election the Conservatives gained 1 seat with 56.2% of the vote, the Liberal Democrats made no gains or losses with 22.0%, independents made no gains or losses with 7.7%, and UKIP lost their seat on the council without contesting any seats.

The seats up for election this year were last elected in 2018. In that election, the Conservatives gained 1 seat with 54.1% of the vote, the Liberal Democrats made no net gains or losses with 28.4%, independents made no gains or losses with 3.5%, and UKIP lost the seat they were defending with 0.2%.

As a result of this election, the Conservatives increased their majority to 20 seats for the first time since 2002. The Liberal Democrats maintained their 5 seats, having gained the Fareham East ward from the Conservatives, but losing Stubbington to the same party. This election also saw the "Fareham Independent Group", registered as a political party, standing for the first time across a number of wards - although unsuccessfully.

== Previous council composition ==
After 2021 election		Before 2022 election	
Party	Seats	Party	Seats
Conservative	23	Conservative	23
Liberal Democrats	5	Liberal Democrats	5
Independent	3	Independent	3

== Results ==
Fareham Borough Council Election, 2022
Party	Seats	Gains	Losses	Net gain/loss	Seats %	Votes %	Votes	+/−
Conservative	12	3	1	+2	75	45.7	15,830	-8.4
Liberal Democrats	3	1	1	0	18.8	25.7	8,921	-2.7
Independent	1	0	0	0	6.3	3.9	1,346	+0.4
Labour	0	0	0	0	0	13.2	4,567	+0.3
Green	0	0	0	0	0	2.6	897	+1.7
Reform	0	0	0	0	0	0.1	44	+0.1
Monster Raving Loony	0	0	0	0	0	0.4	124	+0.4
Fareham Independent Group	0	0	2	-2	0	8.5	2,944	+8.5

== Results by ward ==
An asterisk indicates an incumbent councillor.

=== Fareham East ===
Fareham East
Party	Candidate	Votes	%	±%
Liberal Democrats	David Hamilton	1,059	43.2	+9.0
Conservative	Tom Davies*	967	39.5	−10.4
Labour	Gemma Oughton	272	11.1	−4.8
Green	Lydia Brown	150	6.1	+6.1
Majority		92	3.76	
Turnout		2,448	41	
Liberal Democrats gain from Conservative		Swing	9.7	

=== Fareham North ===
Fareham North
Party	Candidate	Votes	%	±%
Conservative	Pamela Bryant*	962	43.1	−20.0
Fareham Independent Group	Jean Wigmore	528	23.6	+23.6
Liberal Democrats	Ciaran Urry-Tuttiett	365	16.3	+1.5
Green	David Harrison	220	9.8	+1.3
Labour	Sean Schofield	157	7.0	−6.6
Majority		434	19.4	
Turnout		2,232	40	
Conservative hold		Swing		

=== Fareham North West ===
Fareham North West
Party	Candidate	Votes	%	±%
Conservative	David Foot	766	44.4	−16.4
Liberal Democrats	Pauline Galea	416	24.1	+15.4
Fareham Independent Group	Kerry Stubbs	293	16.9	+16.9
Labour	Andrew Mooney	251	14.5	−4.3
Majority		350	20.3	
Turnout		1,726	31	
Conservative hold		Swing		

=== Fareham South ===
Fareham South
Party	Candidate	Votes	%	±%
Conservative	Stephen Ingram	608	36.5	−18.8
Labour	Gemma Furnivall	484	29.1	+2.8
Liberal Democrats	Jim Palmer	236	14.2	+3.6
Fareham Independent Group	Paul Sturgess	224	13.5	+13.5
Green	Nick Lyle	113	6.8	−1.0
Majority		124	7.5	
Turnout		1,665	30	
Conservative gain from Independent		Swing		

=== Fareham West ===
Fareham West
Party	Candidate	Votes	%	±%
Conservative	Roger Bird	1,235	53.9	−19.5
Liberal Democrats	Rowena Palmer	383	16.7	+4.3
Labour	James Webb	275	12.0	−2.2
Fareham Independent Group	Tony Goodridge	229	10.0	+10.0
Green	John Vivian	126	5.5	+5.5
Reform	Steve Richards	44	1.9	+1.9
Majority		852	37.2	
Turnout		2,292	43	
Conservative gain from Independent		Swing		

=== Hill Head ===
Hill Head
Party	Candidate	Votes	%	±%
Conservative	Steve Dugan*	1,214	46.0	−8.2
Liberal Democrats	Gerry Drabble	881	33.4	−6.3
Labour	Lynne Murray	418	15.9	+9.9
Monster Raving Loony	Charlie Read	124	4.7	+4.7
Majority		333	12.6	
Turnout		2,637	40	
Conservative hold		Swing		

=== Locks Heath ===
Locks Heath
Party	Candidate	Votes	%	±%
Conservative	Susan Bayford*	1,237	52.3	−21.0
Fareham Independent Group	Julie Kidby	634	26.8	+26.8
Labour	Angela Carr	263	11.1	−3.4
Liberal Democrats	Darren Alderson-Hall	232	9.8	−2.4
Majority		603	25.5	
Turnout		2,366	43	
Conservative hold		Swing	-23.9	

=== Park Gate ===
Park Gate
Party	Candidate	Votes	%	±%
Conservative	Ian Bastable*	1,110	47.7	−21.2
Labour	Nicholas Knight	448	19.2	−11.9
Liberal Democrats	Graham Everdell	368	15.8	+15.8
Green	Tom Newman	210	9.0	+9.0
Fareham Independent Group	Jan Mondey	192	8.3	+8.3
Majority		662	28.4	
Turnout		2,328	27	
Conservative hold		Swing		

=== Portchester East ===
Portchester East
Party	Candidate	Votes	%	±%
Liberal Democrats	Chrissie Bainbridge	1,769	53.7	−10.8
Liberal Democrats	Paul Nother	1,636	49.7	−7.8
Conservative	Harry Davis	1,205	36.6	+5.2
Conservative	Manny Martins	1,128	34.2	+9.1
Labour	Richard Ryan	361	11.0	+0.2
Labour	Les Ricketts	345	10.5	−0.1
Independent	Trevor Alford	146	4.4	+4.4
Majority		431	13.1	−13.0
Turnout		6,590	39	
Liberal Democrats hold		Swing	-10.0	
Liberal Democrats hold		Swing	-6.5	

=== Portchester West ===
Portchester West
Party	Candidate	Votes	%	±%
Conservative	Susan Walker*	822	38.9	−10.8
Liberal Democrats	Ashley Brown	801	37.9	−3.8
Labour	Dominic Martin	327	15.5	+6.9
Fareham Independent Group	David Wiltshire	84	4.0	+4.0
Green	James Durrant	78	3.7	+3.7
Majority		21	1.0	
Turnout		2,112	38	
Conservative hold		Swing		

=== Sarisbury ===
Sarisbury
Party	Candidate	Votes	%	±%
Conservative	Seán Woodward*	1,380	61.3	−10.5
Liberal Democrats	John Hughes	530	23.5	+7.9
Labour	Verden Meldrum	343	15.2	+2.6
Majority		850	37.7	
Turnout		2,253	38	
Conservative hold		Swing		

=== Stubbington ===
Stubbington
Party	Candidate	Votes	%	±%
Conservative	Jacquie Needham	1,033	43.2	+6.6
Liberal Democrats	Jimmy Roberts	918	38.4	−18.3
Fareham Independent Group	Aimee White	228	9.5	+9.5
Labour	Ivan Gray	214	8.9	+5.2
Majority		115	4.8	
Turnout		2,393	44	
Conservative gain from Liberal Democrats		Swing		

=== Titchfield ===
Titchfield
Party	Candidate	Votes	%	±%
Conservative	Connie Hockley*	1,195	53.5	−16.6
Liberal Democrats	Justin Grimley	421	18.8	+3.4
Fareham Independent Group	Bob Murphy	325	14.5	+14.5
Labour	Michael Prior	294	13.2	−1.3
Majority		774	34.6	
Turnout		2,235	39	
Conservative hold		Swing		

=== Titchfield Common ===
Titchfield Common
Party	Candidate	Votes	%	±%
Independent	Jack Englefield*	1,200	52.6	+0.9
Conservative	Sarah Jolliffe	697	30.6	−7.8
Labour	James Carr	227	10.0	+0.1
Liberal Democrats	Sandra Abrams	156	7.5	+7.5
Majority		503	24.2	
Turnout		2,080	38	
Independent hold		Swing		

=== Warsash ===
Warsash
Party	Candidate	Votes	%	±%
Conservative	Frair Burgess	1,437	61.5	−12.3
Liberal Democrats	John Murray	381	16.3	−4.3
Labour	Antony Ferraro	312	13.4	+7.8
Fareham Independent Group	Kirsten Wiltshire	207	8.9	+8.9
Majority		1,056	45.2	
Turnout		2,337	42	
Conservative hold		Swing		

== By-elections ==
=== Portchester East ===
Portchester East: 20 October 2022
Party	Candidate	Votes	%	±%
Conservative	Harry Davis	957	37.6	+3.0
Liberal Democrats	Ciaran Urry-Tuttiett	932	36.6	−14.2
Labour	Dominic Martin	379	14.9	+4.5
Fareham Independent Group	Dave Wiltshire	275	10.8	N/A
Majority		25	1.0	
Turnout		2,543	29.2	
Conservative gain from Liberal Democrats		Swing	▲8.6	

Preceded by 2021 Fareham Borough Council election	Fareham local elections	Succeeded by 2024 Fareham Borough Council election
