= 2000 Fareham Borough Council election =

2000 UK local government election

The 2000 Fareham Council election took place on 4 May 2000 to elect members of Fareham Borough Council in Hampshire, England. One third of the council was up for election and the Conservative Party stayed in overall control of the council.

After the election, the composition of the council was:

- Conservative 29
- Liberal Democrat 11
- Labour 2

== Election result ==
The results saw the Conservatives increase their majority on the council after gaining 5 seats. The Labour Party lost all 3 of the seats they had been defending, while the other 2 Conservative gains came from the Liberal Democrats. 2 Liberal Democrat councillors were the only non Conservatives elected after holding Portchester Central and Stubbington wards. Turnout in the election varied between a high of 39.5% in Portchester East and a low of 21.9% in Fareham South.

Fareham local election result 2000
Party	Seats	Gains	Losses	Net gain/loss	Seats %	Votes %	Votes	+/−
Conservative	12	5	0	+5	85.7	57.7	14,510	+11.9%
Liberal Democrats	2	0	2	-2	14.3	27.1	6,805	-7.1%
Labour	0	0	3	-3	0	15.2	3,820	-4.8%

== Ward results ==
Fareham East
Party	Candidate	Votes	%	±%
Conservative	Peter Maunder	929	51.8	+14.0
Liberal Democrats	Robert Cox	687	38.3	−6.0
Labour	Timothy Brewer	179	10.0	−7.9
Majority		242	13.5	
Turnout		1,795		
Conservative hold		Swing		

Fareham North
Party	Candidate	Votes	%	±%
Conservative	Andrew Bate	968	65.7	+15.2
Liberal Democrats	Doreen Baker	383	26.0	−13.3
Labour	James Malizis	123	8.3	−1.9
Majority		585	39.7	+28.5
Turnout		1,474		
Conservative gain from Liberal Democrats		Swing		

Fareham North-West
Party	Candidate	Votes	%	±%
Conservative	Rosalid Perring	682	52.2	+9.5
Labour	Angela Carr	408	31.2	−5.1
Liberal Democrats	Adrian Iles	217	16.6	−4.5
Majority		274	21.0	+14.6
Turnout		1,307		
Conservative gain from Labour		Swing		

Fareham South
Party	Candidate	Votes	%	±%
Conservative	Dennis Steadman	451	43.4	+12.2
Labour	James Carr	420	40.4	−10.5
Liberal Democrats	Jennifer Chaloner	169	16.3	−1.5
Majority		31	3.0	
Turnout		1,040	21.9	+0.7
Conservative gain from Labour		Swing		

Fareham West
Party	Candidate	Votes	%	±%
Conservative	Leslie Keeble	1,375	63.9	+27.1
Liberal Democrats	Ronald Culver	586	27.2	−23.0
Labour	Wilfred Phillips	192	8.9	−4.2
Majority		789	36.6	
Turnout		2,153		
Conservative gain from Liberal Democrats		Swing		

Hill Head
Party	Candidate	Votes	%	±%
Conservative	Arthur Mandry	1,626	66.8	+18.1
Liberal Democrats	Georgina Bevis	598	24.6	−18.8
Labour	Ivan Gray	210	8.6	+0.7
Majority		1,028	42.2	+36.9
Turnout		2,434		
Conservative hold		Swing		

Locks Heath
Party	Candidate	Votes	%	±%
Conservative	Ruth Godrich	1,585	51.9	+3.9
Liberal Democrats	David Savage	1,006	32.9	−0.2
Labour	Tracey Malizis	463	15.2	−3.7
Majority		579	19.0	+4.1
Turnout		3,054		
Conservative hold		Swing		

Portchester Central
Party	Candidate	Votes	%	±%
Liberal Democrats	Roger Price	940	62.3	+9.6
Conservative	Susan Walker	345	22.8	+2.3
Labour	Leslie Ricketts	225	14.9	−11.9
Majority		595	39.4	+13.5
Turnout		1,510		
Liberal Democrats hold		Swing		

Portchester East
Party	Candidate	Votes	%	±%
Conservative	Robert Alexander	730	46.3	+6.3
Labour	Richard Ryan	513	32.6	+6.9
Liberal Democrats	Peter Rudwick	332	21.1	−13.2
Majority		217	13.8	+8.1
Turnout		1,575	39.5	+5.6
Conservative gain from Labour		Swing		

Portchester West
Party	Candidate	Votes	%	±%
Conservative	Ernest Crouch	1,055	63.6	+15.9
Liberal Democrats	Lionel Yeates	357	21.5	−11.1
Labour	Cameron Crouchman	247	14.9	−4.8
Majority		698	42.1	+27.0
Turnout		1,659		
Conservative hold		Swing		

Sarisbury
Party	Candidate	Votes	%	±%
Conservative	Keith Evans	1,541	79.1	+5.9
Liberal Democrats	Elizabeth Williamson	230	11.8	−1.6
Labour	Nicholas Knight	178	9.1	−4.3
Majority		1,311	67.3	+7.6
Turnout		1,949		
Conservative hold		Swing		

Stubbington
Party	Candidate	Votes	%	±%
Liberal Democrats	Rosabelle Miller	837	46.8	−18.5
Conservative	Gordan Coggan	786	44.0	+18.4
Labour	Ian Christie	164	9.2	+0.1
Majority		51	2.9	−36.8
Turnout		1,787		
Liberal Democrats hold		Swing		

Titchfield
Party	Candidate	Votes	%	±%
Conservative	Malcolm Harper	1,052	67.2	+9.2
Liberal Democrats	Colin Dawe	266	17.0	−4.6
Labour	Francis Allison	247	15.8	−4.6
Majority		786	50.2	+13.9
Turnout		1,565		
Conservative hold		Swing		

Warsash
Party	Candidate	Votes	%	±%
Conservative	Trevor Cartwright	1,385	75.6	+9.7
Labour	Graham Holden	251	13.7	−20.4
Liberal Democrats	Janet Hughes	197	10.7	+10.7
Majority		1,134	61.9	+30.1
Turnout		1,833		
Conservative hold		Swing		

Preceded by 1999 Fareham Council election	Fareham local elections	Succeeded by 2002 Fareham Council election
