= 1998 Fareham Borough Council election =

1998 UK local government election

The 1998 Fareham Council election took place on 7 May 1998 to elect members of Fareham Borough Council in Hampshire, England. One third of the council was up for election and the Labour Party stayed in overall control of the council.

After the election, the composition of the council was:

- Liberal Democrat 16
- Conservative 14
- Labour 8
- Others 4

== Election result ==
Fareham local election result 1998
Party	Seats	Gains	Losses	Net gain/loss	Seats %	Votes %	Votes	+/−
Conservative	7			+5	50.0	42.1	10,552	
Liberal Democrats	6			-4	42.9	32.6	8,181	
Labour	1			0	7.1	19.8	4,973	
Liberal	0			-1	0.0	2.3	580	
Conservative	0			0	0.0	1.8	449	
Independent Warsash Residents' Association	0			0	0.0	1.4	342	

== Ward results ==
Fareham East
Party	Candidate	Votes	%	±%
Liberal Democrats	Donald Murray	819	53.7	
Conservative	David Kemp	483	31.7	
Labour	Alison Garrett	222	14.6	
Majority		336	22.0	
Turnout		1,524	29.3	

Fareham North
Party	Candidate	Votes	%	±%
Liberal Democrats	Peter Davies	681	43.7	
Conservative	Patrick Dibben	645	41.4	
Labour	Barry Towler	231	14.8	
Majority		36	2.3	
Turnout		1,557	32.4	

Fareham North-West
Party	Candidate	Votes	%	±%
Conservative	Evelyn Burley	451	35.1	
Labour	Brenda Pleasants	442	34.4	
Liberal Democrats	Clive Cunnington	392	30.5	
Majority		9	0.7	
Turnout		1,285	22.8	

Fareham South
Party	Candidate	Votes	%	±%
Labour	Michael Prior	589	56.0	
Conservative	Robert Smith	278	26.4	
Liberal Democrats	Jennifer Chaloner	185	17.6	
Majority		311	29.6	
Turnout		1,052	21.9	

Fareham West
Party	Candidate	Votes	%	±%
Liberal Democrats	Eric Dunn	1,067	53.2	
Conservative	Charles Tierney	679	33.9	
Labour	Wilfred Phillips	259	12.9	
Majority		388	19.4	
Turnout		2,005	36.8	

Hill Head
Party	Candidate	Votes	%	±%
Conservative	David Curtis	1,087	47.3	
Liberal Democrats	Peter Chapman	900	39.1	
Labour	Karen Gray	313	13.6	
Majority		187	8.1	
Turnout		2,300	36.9	

Locks Heath
Party	Candidate	Votes	%	±%
Liberal Democrats	Jonathan Englefield	1,134	37.9	
Conservative	Susan Wilson	888	29.6	
Labour	Angela Carr	698	23.3	
Conservative	Carolyn Lee	275	9.2	
Majority		246	8.2	
Turnout		2,995	26.4	

Portchester Central
Party	Candidate	Votes	%	±%
Liberal Democrats	David Norris	761	53.8	
Labour	Debra Cusack	367	26.0	
Conservative	Susan Walker	286	20.2	
Majority		394	27.9	
Turnout		1,414	31.2	

Portchester East
Party	Candidate	Votes	%	±%
Conservative	Nicholas Walker	551	41.4	
Labour	Ian Christie	403	30.3	
Liberal Democrats	Lionel Yeates	377	28.3	
Majority		148	11.1	
Turnout		1,331	31.9	

Portchester West
Party	Candidate	Votes	%	±%
Conservative	Bernard Munden	880	52.0	
Liberal Democrats	Eleanor Murray	462	27.3	
Labour	Leslie Ricketts	350	20.7	
Majority		418	24.7	
Turnout		1,692	29.1	

Sarisbury
Party	Candidate	Votes	%	±%
Conservative	Sean Woodward	1,735	74.1	
Labour	Nicholas Knight	246	10.5	
Liberal Democrats	Elizabeth Williamson	185	7.9	
Conservative	Philip Garrett	174	7.4	
Majority		1,489	63.6	
Turnout		2,340	36.1	

Stubbington
Party	Candidate	Votes	%	±%
Liberal Democrats	Linda Owen	1,027	52.1	
Conservative	Linda Bounds	702	35.6	
Labour	Michael Taylor	243	12.3	
Majority		325	16.5	
Turnout		1,972	37.5	

Titchfield
Party	Candidate	Votes	%	±%
Conservative	Constance Hockley	727	44.8	
Liberal	John Thompson	580	35.8	
Labour	Beryl Oldroyd	315	19.4	
Majority		147	9.1	
Turnout		1,622	28.3	

Warsash
Party	Candidate	Votes	%	±%
Conservative	Keith Estlin	1,160	58.4	
Independent Warsash Residents' Association	Deborah Emery	342	17.2	
Labour	Graham Holden	295	14.8	
Liberal Democrats	Keith Byrne	191	9.6	
Majority		818	41.1	
Turnout		1,988	29.8	

Preceded by 1996 Fareham Council election	Fareham local elections	Succeeded by 1999 Fareham Council election
