= 2024 Fareham Borough Council election =

Local election in Fareham, England

- 2 May 2024

All 32 seats to Fareham Borough Council 17 seats needed for a majority

| | Majority party | Minority party |
|---|---|---|
| Leader | Seán Woodward | Chrissie Bainbridge |
| Party | Conservative | Liberal Democrats |
| Last election | 25 | 5 |
| Seats before | 24 | 4 |
| Seats after | 22 | 8 |
| | Third party | Fourth party |
| Party | Labour | Independent |
| Last election | 0 | 1 |
| Seats before | 0 | 3 |
| Seats after | 1 | 1 |
- Results by ward
Leader before election
Seán Woodward
Conservative
Leader after election
Simon Martin
Conservative

The 2024 Fareham Borough Council election was held on Thursday 2 May 2024, alongside the other local elections in the United Kingdom. All 32 members of Fareham Borough Council in Hampshire were elected following boundary changes.

The council remained under Conservative majority control.

== Background ==
Since its creation in 1974, only the Conservatives have ever formed majorities on the council. The party has held majorities on the council for its entire history, except between 1986 and 1987, and between 1994 and 1999. The Liberal Democrats briefly overtook the Conservatives as the largest party in this second period of no overall control, but never formed a majority.

In the previous election in 2022, the Conservatives gained 2 seats with 45.7% of the vote, the Liberal Democrats maintained their 5 seats with 25.7%, and independents won 1 with 3.9%. The leader of the council prior to the election was Conservative councillor Seán Woodward, who had held the post since 1999. He did not stand for re-election in 2024. After the election, the Conservatives chose Simon Martin to be their new group leader; he was formally appointed as the new leader of the council at the subsequent annual council meeting on 16 May 2024.

== Boundary changes ==
Fareham usually elects its councillors in halves, on a 4-year cycle. However, following boundary changes, all councillors will be elected to the new wards. The change increases the number of councillors by 1.

| Old wards | No. of seats | New wards | No. of seats |
|---|---|---|---|
| Fareham East | 2 | Avenue | 2 |
| Fareham North | 2 | Fareham Park | 2 |
| Fareham North-West | 2 | Fareham Town | 2 |
| Fareham South | 2 | Fort Fareham | 2 |
| Fareham West | 2 | Hill Head | 2 |
| Hill Head | 2 | Hook-with-Warsash | 2 |
| Locks Heath | 2 | Locks Heath | 2 |
| Park Gate | 3 | Park Gate | 2 |
| Portchester East | 3 | Portchester Castle | 2 |
| Portchester West | 2 | Portchester Wicor | 2 |
| Sarisbury | 2 | Sarisbury and Whiteley | 2 |
| Stubbington | 2 | Stubbington | 2 |
| Titchfield | 2 | Titchfield | 2 |
| Titchfield Common | 2 | Titchfield Common | 2 |
| Warsash | 2 | Uplands and Funtley | 2 |
| | | Wallington and Downend | 2 |

== Previous council composition ==
| After 2022 election | | Before 2024 election | | After 2024 election | |
| Party | Seats | Party | Seats | Party | Seats |
|---|---|---|---|---|---|
| Conservative | 25 | Conservative | 24 | Conservative | 22 |
| Liberal Democrats | 5 | Liberal Democrats | 4 | Liberal Democrats | 8 |
| Independent | 1 | Independent | 3 | Independent | 1 |
| | | | | Labour | 1 |

Changes 2022–2024:

- September 2022: Jean Kelly (Liberal Democrats) resigns; by-election held October 2022
- October 2022: Harry Davis (Conservative) gains by-election from Liberal Democrats
- February 2023: Nick Gregory leaves Conservatives to sit as an independent
- May 2023: Sarah Pankhurst leaves Conservatives to sit as an independent

== Results by ward ==
Fareham Borough Council after the 2024 UK local elections

An asterisk indicates an incumbent councillor.

=== Avenue ===
Avenue (2)
| Party | Candidate | Votes | % | ±% |
|---|---|---|---|---|
| Conservative | Tina Ellis* | 1,310 | 58.0 | |
| Conservative | Roger Bird* | 1,114 | 49.3 | |
| Labour | James Webb | 451 | 20.0 | |
| Liberal Democrats | Peter Davies | 418 | 18.5 | |
| Liberal Democrats | Sue Flewitt | 395 | 17.5 | |
| Green | Baz Marie | 292 | 12.9 | |
| Majority | | 663 | 29.3 | |
| Turnout | | 2,283 | 37 | |
| Conservative win (new seat) | | | | |
| Conservative win (new seat) | | | | |

=== Fareham Park ===
Fareham Park (2)
| Party | Candidate | Votes | % | ±% |
|---|---|---|---|---|
| Conservative | Fred Birkett* | 689 | 41.3 | |
| Conservative | Lisa Birkett | 669 | 40.1 | |
| Labour | Carina Smith | 474 | 28.4 | |
| Labour | Andrew Mooney | 461 | 27.6 | |
| Liberal Democrats | Kerry Stubbs | 440 | 26.4 | |
| Liberal Democrats | Ben Foster | 398 | 23.8 | |
| Majority | | 195 | 11.7 | |
| Turnout | | 1,694 | 29 | |
| Conservative win (new seat) | | | | |
| Conservative win (new seat) | | | | |

=== Fareham Town ===
Fareham Town (2)
| Party | Candidate | Votes | % | ±% |
|---|---|---|---|---|
| Liberal Democrats | Lisa Whittle | 810 | 50.1 | |
| Liberal Democrats | Kirsten Wiltshire | 763 | 47.2 | |
| Conservative | Melojane Herbert | 384 | 23.7 | |
| Conservative | Julie Bird | 367 | 22.7 | |
| Labour | Abbie Eales | 278 | 17.2 | |
| Labour | Lee Woods | 229 | 14.2 | |
| Green | John Vivian | 166 | 10.3 | |
| Majority | | 379 | 23.5 | |
| Turnout | | 1,630 | 32 | |
| Liberal Democrats win (new seat) | | | | |
| Liberal Democrats win (new seat) | | | | |

=== Fort Fareham ===
Fort Fareham (2)
| Party | Candidate | Votes | % | ±% |
|---|---|---|---|---|
| Labour | Gemma Furnivall | 751 | 40.4 | |
| Conservative | Stephen Ingram* | 637 | 34.3 | |
| Labour | James Fellows | 632 | 34.0 | |
| Conservative | Freya North | 601 | 32.4 | |
| Green | Nick Lyle | 230 | 12.4 | |
| Independent | Nick Gregory | 214 | 11.5 | |
| Liberal Democrats | John Tilley | 213 | 11.5 | |
| Independent | Sharon Hughes | 205 | 11.0 | |
| Majority | | 5 | 0.3 | |
| Turnout | | 1,869 | 32 | |
| Labour win (new seat) | | | | |
| Conservative win (new seat) | | | | |

=== Hill Head ===
Hill Head (2)
| Party | Candidate | Votes | % | ±% |
|---|---|---|---|---|
| Conservative | Kay Mandry* | 1,167 | 49.2 | |
| Conservative | Steve Dugan* | 1,124 | 47.4 | |
| Labour | Lynne Murray | 743 | 31.3 | |
| Labour | David Rodgers | 569 | 24.0 | |
| Liberal Democrats | Max Zambo | 353 | 14.9 | |
| Reform | Gerry Drabble | 227 | 9.6 | |
| Reform | Owen Drabble | 202 | 8.5 | |
| Majority | | 381 | 16.1 | |
| Turnout | | 2,387 | 41 | |
| Conservative win (new seat) | | | | |
| Conservative win (new seat) | | | | |

=== Hook-with-Warsash ===
Hook-with-Warsash (2)
| Party | Candidate | Votes | % | ±% |
|---|---|---|---|---|
| Conservative | Mike Ford* | 1,146 | 60.3 | |
| Conservative | Frair Burgess* | 1,077 | 56.7 | |
| Liberal Democrats | Jon Sacker | 400 | 21.1 | |
| Labour | Antony Ferraro | 322 | 17.0 | |
| Green | Lewis Hall | 277 | 14.6 | |
| Liberal Democrats | Dominic Wong | 171 | 9.0 | |
| Green | Tom Newman | 82 | 4.3 | |
| Majority | | 677 | 35.6 | |
| Turnout | | 1,917 | 38 | |
| Conservative win (new seat) | | | | |
| Conservative win (new seat) | | | | |

=== Locks Heath ===
Locks Heath (2)
| Party | Candidate | Votes | % | ±% |
|---|---|---|---|---|
| Conservative | Susan Bayford* | 1,150 | 52.5 | |
| Conservative | Malcolm Daniells* | 981 | 44.8 | |
| Liberal Democrats | Sue Hardie | 587 | 26.8 | |
| Labour | Alexander Reed | 442 | 20.2 | |
| Liberal Democrats | Dave Leonard | 419 | 19.1 | |
| Green | Anne-Marie Burdfield | 301 | 13.7 | |
| Majority | | 394 | 18.0 | |
| Turnout | | 2,211 | 36 | |
| Conservative win (new seat) | | | | |
| Conservative win (new seat) | | | | |

=== Park Gate ===
Park Gate (2)
| Party | Candidate | Votes | % | ±% |
|---|---|---|---|---|
| Conservative | Ian Bastable* | 957 | 46.2 | |
| Conservative | Simon Martin* | 948 | 45.8 | |
| Liberal Democrats | Graham Everdell | 921 | 44.5 | |
| Liberal Democrats | Gayathri Sathyanath | 635 | 30.7 | |
| Labour | Verden Meldrum | 343 | 16.6 | |
| Majority | | 27 | 1.3 | |
| Turnout | | 2,085 | 34 | |
| Conservative win (new seat) | | | | |
| Conservative win (new seat) | | | | |

=== Portchester Castle ===
Portchester Castle (2)
| Party | Candidate | Votes | % | ±% |
|---|---|---|---|---|
| Liberal Democrats | Chrissie Bainbridge* | 1,117 | 51.0 | |
| Liberal Democrats | David Wiltshire | 1,007 | 46.0 | |
| Conservative | Susan Walker* | 694 | 31.7 | |
| Conservative | Nicholas Walker* | 684 | 31.2 | |
| Labour | Tania Almond | 320 | 14.6 | |
| Labour | Richard Ryan | 308 | 14.1 | |
| Majority | | 313 | 14.3 | |
| Turnout | | 2,213 | 54 | |
| Liberal Democrats win (new seat) | | | | |
| Liberal Democrats win (new seat) | | | | |

=== Portchester Wicor ===
Portchester Wicor (2)
| Party | Candidate | Votes | % | ±% |
|---|---|---|---|---|
| Liberal Democrats | Paul Nother* | 926 | 51.6 | |
| Liberal Democrats | Paul Whittle | 835 | 46.5 | |
| Conservative | Tom Davies | 553 | 30.8 | |
| Conservative | Claire Turner | 548 | 30.5 | |
| Labour | Dominic Martin | 251 | 14.0 | |
| Labour | Adriano Maluf | 187 | 10.4 | |
| Majority | | 282 | 15.7 | |
| Turnout | | 1,812 | 35 | |
| Liberal Democrats win (new seat) | | | | |
| Liberal Democrats win (new seat) | | | | |

=== Sarisbury & Whiteley ===
Sarisbury & Whiteley (2)
| Party | Candidate | Votes | % | ±% |
|---|---|---|---|---|
| Conservative | Joanne Burton | 1,178 | 53.5 | |
| Conservative | David Foot* | 1,036 | 47.0 | |
| Liberal Democrats | John Hughes | 1,002 | 45.5 | |
| Liberal Democrats | Michael Targ | 843 | 38.3 | |
| Majority | | 34 | 1.5 | |
| Turnout | | 2,226 | 37 | |
| Conservative win (new seat) | | | | |
| Conservative win (new seat) | | | | |

=== Stubbington ===
Stubbington (2)
| Party | Candidate | Votes | % | ±% |
|---|---|---|---|---|
| Conservative | Pal Hayre* | 1,140 | 52.4 | |
| Conservative | Jacquie Needham* | 860 | 39.5 | |
| Liberal Democrats | Alex Brims | 462 | 21.2 | |
| Labour | Joseph Adamson | 424 | 19.5 | |
| Labour | Ivan Gray | 379 | 17.4 | |
| Reform | Jimmy Roberts | 270 | 12.4 | |
| Reform | Keith Barton | 226 | 10.4 | |
| Majority | | 398 | 18.3 | |
| Turnout | | 2,195 | 40 | |
| Conservative win (new seat) | | | | |
| Conservative win (new seat) | | | | |

=== Titchfield ===
Titchfield (2)
| Party | Candidate | Votes | % | ±% |
|---|---|---|---|---|
| Conservative | Connie Hockley* | 878 | 47.6 | |
| Conservative | Tiffany Harper* | 828 | 44.9 | |
| Labour | Michael Prior | 442 | 24.0 | |
| Independent | Chris Milburn | 425 | 23.0 | |
| Green | Rebecca Longley | 336 | 18.2 | |
| Independent | Kevin Fraser | 302 | 16.4 | |
| Majority | | 386 | 20.9 | |
| Turnout | | 1,857 | 33 | |
| Conservative win (new seat) | | | | |
| Conservative win (new seat) | | | | |

=== Titchfield Common ===
Titchfield Common (2)
| Party | Candidate | Votes | % | ±% |
|---|---|---|---|---|
| Independent | Jack Englefield* | 1,255 | 58.2 | |
| Conservative | Andrew Murphy | 904 | 41.9 | |
| Independent | Sarah Pankhurst* | 677 | 31.4 | |
| Labour | James Carr | 376 | 17.4 | |
| Majority | | 227 | 10.5 | |
| Turnout | | 2,167 | 36 | |
| Independent win (new seat) | | | | |
| Conservative win (new seat) | | | | |

=== Uplands & Funtley ===
Uplands & Funtley (2)
| Party | Candidate | Votes | % | ±% |
|---|---|---|---|---|
| Conservative | Pamela Bryant* | 657 | 42.9 | |
| Conservative | Louise Clubley* | 619 | 40.4 | |
| Liberal Democrats | Jeannie Wigmore | 584 | 38.1 | |
| Liberal Democrats | Hazel Croft-Phillips | 540 | 35.2 | |
| Labour | Trevor Kettle | 192 | 12.5 | |
| Green | David Harrison | 159 | 10.4 | |
| Green | Dilys Harrison | 154 | 10.1 | |
| Majority | | 35 | 2.3 | |
| Turnout | | 1,545 | 42 | |
| Conservative win (new seat) | | | | |
| Conservative win (new seat) | | | | |

=== Wallington & Downend ===
Wallington & Downend (2)
| Party | Candidate | Votes | % | ±% |
|---|---|---|---|---|
| Liberal Democrats | David Hamilton* | 1,024 | 50.9 | |
| Liberal Democrats | Alison West | 939 | 46.7 | |
| Conservative | Harry Davis* | 815 | 40.5 | |
| Conservative | Manny Martins | 772 | 38.4 | |
| Labour | Leslie Ricketts | 208 | 10.3 | |
| Green | Dawn Rowlatt | 136 | 6.8 | |
| Green | Lydia Brown | 128 | 6.4 | |
| Majority | | 124 | 6.2 | |
| Turnout | | 2,011 | 41 | |
| Liberal Democrats win (new seat) | | | | |
| Liberal Democrats win (new seat) | | | | |

| Preceded by 2022 Fareham Borough Council election | Fareham local elections | Succeeded by 2026 Fareham Borough Council election |
