= 2010 Fareham Borough Council election =

2010 UK local government election

- 6 May 2010

16 of 31 seats to Fareham Borough Council 16 seats needed for a majority
	First party	Second party
Party	Conservative	Liberal Democrats
Seats before	22	9
Seats won	10	6
Seat change	Steady	Steady
Popular vote	32,933	26,566
Percentage	48.4%	39.0%
Swing	▼12.4%	▲11.8%
Council control before election
Conservatives
Council control after election
Conservatives

The 2010 Fareham Council election took place on 6 May 2010 to elect members of Fareham Borough Council in Hampshire, England. Half of the council was up for election and the Conservative Party stayed in overall control of the council.

After the election, the composition of the council was:

- Conservative 22
- Liberal Democrat 9

== Election result ==
The election saw the Conservatives retain control of the council after winning 10 seats compared to 6 for the Liberal Democrats. Four new councillors were elected after the previous councillors stood down, while both the Conservative leader of the council Sean Woodward and the Liberal Democrat group leader Roger Price were re-elected. Overall turnout was high at 71.62% after the election was held at the same time as the 2010 general election.

Fareham local election result 2010
Party	Seats	Gains	Losses	Net gain/loss	Seats %	Votes %	Votes	+/−
Conservative	10	0	0	0	62.5	48.4	32,933	-12.4
Liberal Democrats	6	0	0	0	37.5	39.0	26,566	+11.8
Labour	0	0	0	0	0.0	10.2	6,934	+3.4
UKIP	0	0	0	0	0.0	1.0	661	-0.2
Green	0	0	0	0	0.0	0.9	611	-0.4
Independent	0	0	0	0	0.0	0.3	218	-1.0
English Democrat	0	0	0	0	0.0	0.2	150	-0.3

== Ward results ==
=== Fareham East ===
Fareham East
Party	Candidate	Votes	%	±%
Liberal Democrats	Paul Whittle	1,943	47.5	−1.2
Conservative	Peter Latham	1,749	42.8	−2.5
Labour	Cameron Crouchman	395	9.7	+3.7
Majority		194	4.7	+1.3
Turnout		4,087		
Liberal Democrats hold		Swing		

=== Fareham North ===
Fareham North
Party	Candidate	Votes	%	±%
Conservative	Pamela Bryant	2,464	60.2	−12.1
Liberal Democrats	Doreen Baker	933	22.8	+10.0
Labour	Simon Brown	457	11.2	+3.7
Green	David Harrison	239	5.8	−1.6
Majority		1,531	37.4	−22.1
Turnout		4,093		
Conservative hold		Swing		

=== Fareham North West ===
Fareham North West
Party	Candidate	Votes	%	±%
Liberal Democrats	Peter Davies	1,987	55.0	+2.1
Conservative	Stephen Day	951	26.3	−14.0
Labour	Angela Carr	498	13.8	+7.0
UKIP	Graeme Young	179	5.0	+5.0
Majority		1,036	28.7	+16.2
Turnout		3,615		
Liberal Democrats hold		Swing		

=== Fareham South ===
Fareham South
Party	Candidate	Votes	%	±%
Conservative	Dennis Steadman	1,589	48.1	−11.1
Liberal Democrats	Rowena Leonard	761	23.0	+7.2
Labour	James Carr	655	19.8	+2.8
English Democrat	Joe Jenkins	150	4.5	+4.5
Green	John Vivian	147	4.5	−3.6
Majority		828	25.1	−17.1
Turnout		3,302		
Conservative hold		Swing		

=== Fareham West ===
Fareham West
Party	Candidate	Votes	%	±%
Conservative	Leslie Keeble	2,526	61.8	−6.6
Liberal Democrats	Jennifer Chaloner	858	21.0	+7.8
Labour	Michael Prior	423	10.3	+4.6
UKIP	Steve Richards	283	6.9	−5.8
Majority		1,668	40.8	−14.4
Turnout		4,090		
Conservative hold		Swing		

=== Hill Head ===
Hill Head
Party	Candidate	Votes	%	±%
Conservative	Arthur Mandry	2,721	59.4	−14.7
Liberal Democrats	Sandra Abrams	1,427	31.2	+10.4
Labour	Ian Christie	429	9.4	+4.4
Majority		1,294	28.3	−25.0
Turnout		4,577		
Conservative hold		Swing		

=== Locks Heath ===
Locks Heath
Party	Candidate	Votes	%	±%
Conservative	Susan Bayford	2,439	57.4	−3.0
Liberal Democrats	Hugh Pritchard	1,373	32.3	+19.8
Labour	Nicholas Knight	439	10.3	+4.3
Majority		1,066	25.1	−14.2
Turnout		4,251		
Conservative hold		Swing		

=== Park Gate ===
Park Gate
Party	Candidate	Votes	%	±%
Conservative	Brian Bayford	2,362	57.6	−18.4
Liberal Democrats	Martin Haysom	1,186	28.9	+13.2
Labour	Helen Price	556	13.5	+5.2
Majority		1,176	28.7	−31.6
Turnout		4,104		
Conservative hold		Swing		

=== Portchester East ===
Portchester East (2)
Party	Candidate	Votes	%	±%
Liberal Democrats	Roger Price	3,554		
Liberal Democrats	Christopher Brown	3,178		
Conservative	Geoff Fazackarley	1,929		
Conservative	Andrew Smith	1,231		
Labour	Stuart Rose	721		
Labour	Richard Ryan	607		
Turnout		11,220		
Liberal Democrats hold		Swing		
Liberal Democrats hold		Swing		

=== Portchester West ===
Portchester West
Party	Candidate	Votes	%	±%
Conservative	Susan Bell	1,856	43.7	−16.5
Liberal Democrats	Diana East	1,566	36.9	+10.9
Labour	Les Ricketts	406	9.6	+2.9
Independent	Shaun Cunningham	218	5.1	+5.1
UKIP	Peter White	199	4.7	+4.7
Majority		290	6.8	−27.4
Turnout		4,245		
Conservative hold		Swing		

=== Sarisbury ===
Sarisbury
Party	Candidate	Votes	%	±%
Conservative	Sean Woodward	2,785	68.0	−13.6
Liberal Democrats	David Savage	1,311	32.0	+19.1
Majority		1,474	36.0	−32.7
Turnout		4,096		
Conservative hold		Swing		

=== Stubbington ===
Stubbington
Party	Candidate	Votes	%	±%
Liberal Democrats	Jim Forrest	2,159	51.0	+9.7
Conservative	Andrew Gaisford	1,773	41.9	−13.4
Labour	Mike Segar	302	7.1	+3.7
Majority		386	9.1	
Turnout		4,234		
Liberal Democrats hold		Swing		

=== Titchfield ===
Titchfield
Party	Candidate	Votes	%	±%
Conservative	Connie Hockley	2,475	59.8	−12.3
Liberal Democrats	Sharon Englefield	987	23.9	+9.6
Labour	Alan Mayes	450	10.9	+2.9
Green	Peter Doggett	225	5.4	−0.1
Majority		1,488	36.0	−21.8
Turnout		4,137		
Conservative hold		Swing		

=== Titchfield Common ===
Titchfield Common
Party	Candidate	Votes	%	±%
Liberal Democrats	Jack Englefield	2,454	63.4	+16.8
Conservative	Geoffrey Hockley	1,180	30.5	−20.0
Labour	Andrew Mooney	239	6.2	+3.3
Majority		1,274	32.9	
Turnout		3,873		
Liberal Democrats hold		Swing		

=== Warsash ===
Warsash
Party	Candidate	Votes	%	±%
Conservative	Trevor Cartwright	2,903	70.0	−11.2
Liberal Democrats	Christine Savage	889	21.4	+12.6
Labour	Nicola Moore	357	8.6	+3.4
Majority		2,014	48.5	−24.0
Turnout		4,149		
Conservative hold		Swing		

Preceded by 2008 Fareham Council election	Fareham local elections	Succeeded by 2012 Fareham Council election
