= 2006 Fareham Borough Council election =

2006 UK local government election

← 2004	4 May 2006	2008 →

16 of 31 seats to Fareham Borough Council 16 seats needed for a majority
	First party	Second party
Party	Conservative	Liberal Democrats
Seats before	22	9
Seats won	10	6
Seat change	Steady	Steady
Popular vote	19,735	14,074
Percentage	51.8%	37.0%
Swing	▼3.6%	▲4.2%
Council control before election
Conservatives
Council control after election
Conservatives

The 2006 Fareham Council election took place on 4 May 2006 to elect members of Fareham Borough Council in Hampshire, England. Half of the council was up for election and the Conservative Party stayed in overall control of the council.

After the election, the composition of the council was:

- Conservative 22
- Liberal Democrat 9

== Election result ==
The results saw the Conservatives keep control of the council, after the party defended all the seats they had been holding. The Liberal Democrats held the 6 seats they had been defending, while Labour failed to win any seats with their vote share dropping to 8%. This meant the Conservatives had 22 seats, compared to 9 for the Liberal Democrats. The first British National Party candidate standing in Fareham finished with more votes than either of the Labour candidates in Portchester East and said the party would contest more seats at the next election. Overall turnout in the election was 40.86%, similar to the turnout in 2004.

Fareham local election result 2006
Party	Seats	Gains	Losses	Net gain/loss	Seats %	Votes %	Votes	+/−
Conservative	10	0	0	0	62.5	51.8	19,735	-3.6%
Liberal Democrats	6	0	0	0	37.5	37.0	14,074	+4.2%
Labour	0	0	0	0	0	8.1	3,096	-3.0%
Green	0	0	0	0	0	1.7	633	+1.1%
BNP	0	0	0	0	0	1.0	389	+1.0%
UKIP	0	0	0	0	0	0.4	148	+0.4%

== Ward results ==
=== Fareham East ===
Fareham East
Party	Candidate	Votes	%	±%
Liberal Democrats	Donald Murray	1,173	50.4	+1.6
Conservative	Raymond Ellis	998	42.9	+0.9
Labour	Edgar Webb	158	6.8	−2.4
Majority		175	7.5	+0.7
Turnout		2,329	42.1	
Liberal Democrats hold		Swing		

=== Fareham North ===
Fareham North
Party	Candidate	Votes	%	±%
Conservative	Pamela Bryant	1,544	66.6	+8.3
Liberal Democrats	Doreen Baker	371	16.0	−6.1
Green	David Harrison	226	9.8	+1.2
Labour	Alan Mayes	176	7.6	−3.4
Majority		1,173	50.6	+14.4
Turnout		2,317	42.0	
Conservative hold		Swing		

=== Fareham North West ===
Fareham North West
Party	Candidate	Votes	%	±%
Liberal Democrats	Peter Davies	1,233	64.0	+17.4
Conservative	Timothy Geoghegan	545	28.3	−12.4
Labour	Angela Carr	149	7.7	−5.1
Majority		688	35.7	+29.8
Turnout		1,927	36.0	
Liberal Democrats hold		Swing		

=== Fareham South ===
Fareham South
Party	Candidate	Votes	%	±%
Conservative	Dennis Steadman	886	51.0	+1.2
Liberal Democrats	Rowena Leonard	512	29.5	+5.4
Labour	James Carr	338	19.5	−6.6
Majority		374	21.5	−2.1
Turnout		1,736	33.8	
Conservative hold		Swing		

=== Fareham West ===
Fareham West
Party	Candidate	Votes	%	±%
Conservative	Leslie Keeble	1,763	71.3	+4.3
Liberal Democrats	David Savage	495	20.0	−2.5
Labour	Cameron Crouchman	215	8.7	−1.8
Majority		1,268	51.3	+6.8
Turnout		2,473	45.9	
Conservative hold		Swing		

=== Hill Head ===
Hill Head
Party	Candidate	Votes	%	±%
Conservative	Arthur Mandry	1,712	62.9	−5.1
Liberal Democrats	Peter Cannon	675	24.8	+0.9
Green	Joseph D'Souza	181	6.6	+6.6
Labour	Janet Gay	155	5.7	−2.4
Majority		1,037	38.1	−6.0
Turnout		2,723	45.9	
Conservative hold		Swing		

=== Locks Heath ===
Locks Heath
Party	Candidate	Votes	%	±%
Conservative	Michael Godrich	1,371	65.3	+2.4
Liberal Democrats	Sharon Englefield	545	25.9	−0.7
Labour	Nicholas Knight	185	8.8	−1.7
Majority		826	39.3	+3.0
Turnout		2,101	38.3	
Conservative hold		Swing		

=== Park Gate ===
Park Gate
Party	Candidate	Votes	%	±%
Conservative	Brian Bayford	1,343	71.6	+3.7
Liberal Democrats	Martin Haysom	343	18.3	−1.3
Labour	Brenda Caines	189	10.1	−2.4
Majority		1,000	53.3	+5.0
Turnout		1,875	34.4	
Conservative hold		Swing		

=== Portchester East ===
Portchester East (2)
Party	Candidate	Votes	%	±%
Liberal Democrats	Roger Price	2,394		
Liberal Democrats	Diana East	2,105		
Conservative	Bernard Munden	939		
Conservative	Charles Livingstone	820		
BNP	Roger Knight	389		
Labour	Stuart Rose	345		
Labour	Richard Ryan	320		
Turnout		7,312	44.0	
Liberal Democrats hold		Swing		
Liberal Democrats hold		Swing		

=== Portchester West ===
Portchester West
Party	Candidate	Votes	%	±%
Conservative	Ernest Crouch	1,196	47.1	−3.1
Liberal Democrats	Keith Barton	1,011	39.8	−1.1
Labour	Leslie Ricketts	185	7.3	−1.6
UKIP	Peter White	148	5.8	+5.8
Majority		185	7.3	−2.0
Turnout		2,540	44.6	
Conservative hold		Swing		

=== Sarisbury ===
Sarisbury
Party	Candidate	Votes	%	±%
Conservative	Sean Woodward	1,483	80.3	+8.4
Liberal Democrats	Christine Savage	195	10.6	−8.3
Green	Nicola Graham	93	5.0	+5.0
Labour	Clive Coldwell	76	4.1	−5.0
Majority		1,288	69.7	+13.7
Turnout		1,847	38.3	
Conservative hold		Swing		

=== Stubbington ===
Stubbington
Party	Candidate	Votes	%	±%
Liberal Democrats	James Forrest	1,240	48.7	+2.1
Conservative	Christopher Thomas	1,174	46.1	−0.9
Labour	Ian Christie	130	5.1	−1.3
Majority		66	2.6	
Turnout		2,544	45.5	
Liberal Democrats hold		Swing		

=== Titchfield ===
Titchfield
Party	Candidate	Votes	%	±%
Conservative	Constance Hockley	1,508	70.1	+5.2
Liberal Democrats	Jennifer Chaloner	393	18.3	−4.7
Labour	Michael Prior	249	11.6	−0.5
Majority		1,115	51.9	+10.0
Turnout		2,150	38.9	
Conservative hold		Swing		

=== Titchfield Common ===
Titchfield Common
Party	Candidate	Votes	%	±%
Liberal Democrats	Jonathan Englefield	1,134	54.0	+14.0
Conservative	Stephen Mcsevich	856	40.8	−10.3
Labour	Andrew Mooney	109	5.2	−3.7
Majority		278	13.2	
Turnout		2,099	40.0	
Liberal Democrats hold		Swing		

=== Warsash ===
Warsash
Party	Candidate	Votes	%	±%
Conservative	Trevor Cartwright	1,597	76.0	+4.9
Liberal Democrats	Alice Herron	255	12.1	−6.7
Green	Lois Tarbet	133	6.3	+6.3
Labour	June Stevenson	117	5.6	−4.5
Majority		1,342	63.8	+11.4
Turnout		2,102	40.2	
Conservative hold		Swing		

Preceded by 2004 Fareham Council election	Fareham local elections	Succeeded by 2008 Fareham Council election
