= 2014 Fareham Borough Council election =

2014 UK local government election

← 2012	22 May 2014	2016 →

Half of seats (16 of 31) to Fareham Borough Council 16 seats needed for a majority
	First party	Second party
Leader	Seán Woodward	Paul Whittle
Party	Conservative	Liberal Democrats
Seats won	11 (25 total)	3 (5 total)
Seat change	▲1	▼3
Popular vote	16,912	9,180
Percentage	44.9%	24.4%
Swing	▼7.8%	▼1.1%
- Map showing the results of the election in each ward. Colours denote the winning party as shown in the main table of results.
Council control before election
Conservatives
Council control after election
Conservatives

The 2014 Fareham Borough Council elections took place on 22 May 2014 to elect half the members of Fareham Borough Council in Hampshire, England. The Conservative Party are currently the largest party on the council. The last time these seats were contested was in 2010.

The Conservative Party held every seat they defended and gained one from the Liberal Democrats, in the Fareham North West ward. The Liberal Democrats lost a further two seats: in Stubbington to UKIP, who gained their first councillor, and in Titchfield Common, where the incumbent councillor became an Independent.

After the election, the composition of the council was:

- Conservative 24
- Liberal Democrat 5
- UKIP 1
- Independent 1

== Election results ==
The election saw the Conservatives retain control of the council after winning 11 seats compared to 3 for the Liberal Democrats alongside 1 UKIP and 1 Independent, former Liberal Democrat councillor.

Fareham local election result 2014
Party	Seats	Gains	Losses	Net gain/loss	Seats %	Votes %	Votes	+/−
Conservative	11	1	0	0	68.8	44.9	16,912	-7.8
Liberal Democrats	3	0	3	0	18.8	24.4	9,180	-1.1
UKIP	1	1	0	0	6.2	13.8	5,178	+8.4
Independent	1	1	0	0	6.2	5.5	2,064	+5.5
Labour	0	0	0	0	0.0	10.6	4,007	-3.9
Green	0	0	0	0	0.0	0.8	313	-1.1

== Ward results ==
=== Fareham East ===
Fareham East
Party	Candidate	Votes	%	±%
Liberal Democrats	Paul Whittle	1,075	48.0	−11.9
Conservative	Keith Barton	835	37.3	8.2
Labour	Connor Moris	330	14.7	−0.3
Majority		240	10.7	
Turnout		2,240	37.9	
Liberal Democrats hold		Swing		

=== Fareham North ===
Fareham North
Party	Candidate	Votes	%	±%
Conservative	Pamela Bryant	973	42.0	
UKIP	Steve Richards	403	17.4	
Liberal Democrats	Peter Trott	379	16.4	
Independent	Jak Gunter	253	10.9	
Labour	Simon Brown	167	7.2	
Green	David Harrison	143	6.2	
Majority		570	24.6	
Turnout		2,318	40.6	
Conservative hold		Swing		

=== Fareham North West ===
Fareham North West
Party	Candidate	Votes	%	±%
Conservative	Peter Davies	749	39.5	
Liberal Democrats	Jim Palmer	426	22.5	
UKIP	Bob Ingram	423	22.3	
Labour	Richard Ryan	197	10.4	
Independent	Steve Roberts	102	5.4	
Majority		323	17.0	
Turnout		1,897	33.4	
Conservative gain from Liberal Democrats		Swing		

=== Fareham South ===
Fareham South
Party	Candidate	Votes	%	±%
Conservative	Dennis Steadman	700	38.4	
UKIP	Paul Sturgess	519	28.5	
Labour	James Carr	337	18.5	
Independent	Vincent Taylor	148	8.1	
Liberal Democrats	Sean Evans	120	6.6	
Majority		181	9.9	
Turnout		1824	33.6	
Conservative hold		Swing		

=== Fareham West ===
Fareham West
Party	Candidate	Votes	%	±%
Conservative	Leslie Keeble	1,405	57.7	
UKIP	George Neill	467	19.2	
Liberal Democrats	Rowena Palmer	216	8.9	
Labour	James Webb	178	7.3	
Independent	Sarah Taylor	168	6.9	
Majority		938	38.5	
Turnout		2,434	44.0	
Conservative hold		Swing		

=== Hill Head ===
Hill Head
Party	Candidate	Votes	%	±%
Conservative	Arthur Mandry	1,498	52.8	
UKIP	Kenneth Cast	916	32.3	
Liberal Democrats	Daniel Hawkes	230	8.1	
Labour	Nicholas Knight	192	6.8	
Majority		582	20.5	
Turnout		2,836	46.7	
Conservative hold		Swing		

=== Locks Heath ===
Locks Heath
Party	Candidate	Votes	%	±%
Conservative	Susan Bayford	1,620	75.3	
Labour	Angela Carr	271	12.6	
Liberal Democrats	Sue Hardie	261	12.1	
Majority		1,349	62.7	
Turnout		2,152	38.4	
Conservative hold		Swing		

=== Park Gate ===
Park Gate
Party	Candidate	Votes	%	±%
Conservative	Brian Bayford	1,196	65.6	
Labour	Helen Price	391	21.4	
Liberal Democrats	Martin Francis	237	13.0	
Majority		805	44.2	
Turnout		1,824	30.2	
Conservative hold		Swing		

=== Portchester East ===
Portchester East (2)
Party	Candidate	Votes	%	±%
Liberal Democrats	Roger Price	2,134	65.0	
Liberal Democrats	Geoffrey Fazackarley	1,962		
Conservative	Tina Ellis	712	21.4	
Conservative	Peter Furby	634		
Labour	Stuart Rose	433	13.6	
Labour	Cameron Crouch	426		
Majority		1,250	19.8	
Turnout		6,301	39.1	
Liberal Democrats hold		Swing		
Liberal Democrats hold		Swing		

=== Portchester West ===
Portchester West
Party	Candidate	Votes	%	±%
Conservative	Susan Bell	839	35.1	
Liberal Democrats	Shaun Cunningham	797	33.3	
UKIP	Tom Davies	548	22.9	
Labour	Leslie Ricketts	209	8.7	
Majority		42	1.8	
Turnout		2393	41.7	
Conservative hold		Swing		

=== Sarisbury ===
Sarisbury
Party	Candidate	Votes	%	±%
Conservative	Séan Woodward	1,579	75.8	
Liberal Democrats	Mary Holliday-Bishop	287	13.8	
Labour	Karen Postle	217	10.4	
Majority		1,292	62.0	
Turnout		2,083	36.2	
Conservative hold		Swing		

=== Stubbington ===
Stubbington
Party	Candidate	Votes	%	±%
UKIP	Christopher Wood	1,227	43.4	
Conservative	Pal Hayre	841	29.7	
Liberal Democrats	James Forrest	646	22.8	
Labour	David Light	114	4.0	
Majority		386	13.7	
Turnout		2,828	50.2	
UKIP gain from Liberal Democrats		Swing		

=== Titchfield ===
Titchfield
Party	Candidate	Votes	%	±%
Conservative	Connie Hockley	1,313	60.0	
Independent	Susan Boyce	404	18.5	
Labour	Michael Prior	266	12.2	
Liberal Democrats	Jill Underwood	205	9.4	
Majority		909	41.5	
Turnout		2,188	38.1	
Conservative hold		Swing		

=== Titchfield Common ===
Titchfield Common
Party	Candidate	Votes	%	±%
Independent	Jack Englefield	989	45.6	
Conservative	Tom Fyfe	590	27.2	
UKIP	Geoffrey Townley	351	16.2	
Labour	Andrew Mooney	122	5.6	
Liberal Democrats	Hugh Pritchard	116	5.4	
Majority		399	18.4	
Turnout		2,168	35.3	
Independent gain from Liberal Democrats		Swing		

=== Warsash ===
Warsash
Party	Candidate	Votes	%	±%
Conservative	Trevor Cartwright	1,428	65.9	
UKIP	David Nightingale	324	14.9	
Green	Miles Grindey	170	7.8	
Labour	Nicola Moore	157	7.2	
Liberal Democrats	Craig Lewis	89	4.1	
Majority		1,104	51.0	
Turnout		2,168	38.9	
Conservative hold		Swing		

Preceded by 2012 Fareham Council election	Fareham local elections	Succeeded by 2016 Fareham Council election
