= 2016 Fareham Borough Council election =

2016 UK local government election

← 2014	5 May 2016	2018 →

Half of seats (16 of 31) to Fareham Borough Council 16 seats needed for a majority
	First party	Second party
Leader	Seán Woodward	Roger Price
Party	Conservative	Liberal Democrats
Seats won	12 (24 total)	3 (4 total)
Seat change	▼1	0
Popular vote	17,184	7,739
Percentage	52.4%	23.6%
Swing	▲7.5%	▼0.8%
- Map showing the results of the election in each ward. Colours denote the winning party as shown in the main table of results.
Council control before election
Conservatives
Council control after election
Conservatives

The 2016 Fareham Borough Council election took place on 5 May 2016 to elect members of Fareham Borough Council in England. This was on the same day as other local elections.

Half of the seats were up for re-election, with each councillor elected for a term of 4 years (except in the Fareham East ward). The last time these seats were contested was in 2012.

As well as wards in the town of Fareham, candidates were being elected in Hill Head, Locks Heath, Park Gate, Portchester, Titchfield, Sarisbury, Stubbington and Warsash.

In the Fareham East ward, voters elected 2 candidates. The candidate in first place was elected for a 4-year term and the candidate in second place was elected for a 2-year term.

After the election, the composition of the council was:

- Conservative 24
- Liberal Democrat 4
- UKIP 2
- Independent 1

== Election results ==
The Conservatives remained in overall control, winning 12 seats. The Liberal Democrats won 3 seats, and UKIP won 1 seat.

In Fareham West, incumbent councillor Nick Gregory stood down after six years on the council. He was first elected in a 2010 by-election as a Liberal Democrat, before defecting to the Conservatives and holding the seat in the 2012 elections. He then left the Conservative grouping to sit as an independent, before defecting to UKIP and then reverting to being an independent. The Lib Dem opposition leader, Paul Whittle stated that he had "changed colours more times than a set of traffic lights".

Fareham Borough Council Election, 2016
Party	Seats	Gains	Losses	Net gain/loss	Seats %	Votes %	Votes	+/−
Conservative	12	2	1	+1	75.0	52.4	17,184	
Liberal Democrats	3	0	0	0	18.8	23.6	7,739	
Labour	0	0	0	0	0.0	13.0	4,256	
UKIP	1	1	0	+1	6.3	7.7	2,542	
Green	0	0	0	0	0.0	2.9	963	
Independent	0	0	2	-2	0.0	0.4	143	

== Ward results ==
Note that all percentage change are in relation to the 2012 election when these seats were last contested

=== Fareham East ===
Fareham East (2)
Party	Candidate	Votes	%	±%
Liberal Democrats	Katrina Trott	1,376	33.8	−26.1
Liberal Democrats	Maryam Brady	879	21.6	−38.3
Conservative	Tom Davies	755	18.5	−10.6
Conservative	Jackie Hudson	570	14.0	−15.1
Labour	Susan Brown	292	7.2	−3.8
Labour	James Webb	203	5.0	−6.0
Majority		497	12.2	−19.5
Turnout		4,075	41	
Liberal Democrats hold		Swing		
Liberal Democrats hold		Swing		

=== Fareham North ===
Fareham North
Party	Candidate	Votes	%	±%
Conservative	Louise Clubley	1,140	51.8	−6.4
Liberal Democrats	Peter Trott	586	26.6	+8.5
Labour	James Sebley	271	12.3	−0.1
Green	David Harrison	205	9.3	−2.0
Majority		554	25.2	−14.9
Turnout		2,202	40.6	+4.7
Conservative hold		Swing	-7.5	

=== Fareham North West ===
Fareham North West
Party	Candidate	Votes	%	±%
Conservative	Fred Birkett	780	43.6	+7.4
UKIP	Stefan Charidge	416	23.3	+9.8
Labour	Andrew Ovenden	281	15.7	0.0
Liberal Democrats	Dominic Wong	167	9.3	−25.3
Independent	David Whittingham	143	8.0	+8.0
Majority		364	20.4	+18.8
Turnout		1,787	32.9	+4.7
Conservative gain from Independent		Swing	-1.2	

=== Fareham South ===
Fareham South
Party	Candidate	Votes	%	±%
Conservative	Keith Barton	790	43.9	−2.9
UKIP	Paul Sturgess	448	24.9	+24.9
Labour	Richard Ryan	389	21.6	−9.9
Liberal Democrats	Teigan Newman	171	9.5	+1.5
Majority		342	19.0	+3.7
Turnout		2,202	33.7	+6.2
Conservative hold		Swing	-13.9	

=== Fareham West ===
Fareham West
Party	Candidate	Votes	%	±%
Conservative	Tina Ellis	1,608	69.9	+15.6
Labour	Paul King	351	15.3	−0.6
Liberal Democrats	Rowena Palmer	341	14.8	−4.2
Majority		1,257	54.6	+19.3
Turnout		2,300	43.4	+4.8
Conservative gain from Independent		Swing	+8.1	

=== Hill Head ===
Hill Head
Party	Candidate	Votes	%	±%
Conservative	Kay Mandry	1,343	51.6	−15.5
UKIP	Kenneth Cast	779	30.0	+30.0
Liberal Democrats	Benjamin Powell	292	11.2	−8.2
Labour	Cameron Crouchman	187	7.2	−6.3
Majority		564	21.7	−26.0
Turnout		2,601	43.6	+3.7
Conservative hold		Swing	-22.8	

=== Locks Heath ===
Locks Heath
Party	Candidate	Votes	%	±%
Conservative	Keith Evans	1,251	72.2	+8.7
Labour	Nicholas Knight	259	15.0	−2.1
Green	John Burdfield	222	12.8	+12.8
Majority		1008	57.2	+25.6
Turnout		1,732	31.2	−0.4
Conservative hold		Swing	+5.4	

=== Park Gate ===
Park Gate
Party	Candidate	Votes	%	±%
Conservative	Simon Martin	1,096	66.4	+1.9
Labour	James Carr	310	18.8	−3.4
Green	Anthony Stainer	244	14.8	+14.8
Majority		786	47.6	+5.4
Turnout		1,650	26.1	−1.1
Conservative hold		Swing	+2.7	

=== Portchester East ===
Portchester East
Party	Candidate	Votes	%	±%
Liberal Democrats	Shaun Cunningham	1,433	45.5	−8.7
Conservative	Trevor Alford	1,221	38.8	+10.6
Labour	Stuart Rose	495	15.7	−1.9
Majority		212	6.7	−19.2
Turnout		3,149	36.5	+4.7
Liberal Democrats hold		Swing	-9.7	

=== Portchester West ===
Portchester West
Party	Candidate	Votes	%	±%
Conservative	Nicholas Walker	1,104	52.1	+1.9
Liberal Democrats	Gerry Kelly	803	37.9	+16.3
Labour	Leslie Ricketts	211	10.0	−1.1
Majority		301	14.2	−14.3
Turnout		2,118	38.2	+6.7
Conservative hold		Swing	-7.2	

=== Sarisbury ===
Sarisbury
Party	Candidate	Votes	%	±%
Conservative	Jon Butts	1,149	71.7	−3.9
Liberal Democrats	Jim Weeks	240	15.0	+4.1
Labour	Angela Carr	214	13.3	−1.2
Majority		909	56.7	−3.4
Turnout		1,603	27.7	−2.1
Conservative hold		Swing	-4.0	

=== Stubbington ===
Stubbington
Party	Candidate	Votes	%	±%
UKIP	Carolyn Heneghan	899	35.0	+0.6
Liberal Democrats	Jim Forrest	772	30.1	+3.3
Conservative	Pal Hayre	772	30.1	−8.7
Labour	Mark Harrison	123	4.8	+4.8
Majority		127	4.9	+0.5
Turnout		2,566	46.4	+3.6
UKIP gain from Conservative		Swing	+4.7	

=== Titchfield ===
Titchfield
Party	Candidate	Votes	%	±%
Conservative	Tiffany Harper	1,212	67.7	+0.3
Labour	Michael Prior	292	16.3	−2.8
Liberal Democrats	Jill Underwood	286	16.0	+2.5
Majority		920	51.4	+3.0
Turnout		1,790	31.3	−0.5
Conservative hold		Swing	+1.6	

=== Titchfield Common ===
Titchfield Common
Party	Candidate	Votes	%	±%
Conservative	Sarah Pankhurst	996	59.7	+7.0
Liberal Democrats	Martin Francis	295	17.7	−12.3
Labour	Andrew Mooney	223	13.4	−3.9
Green	Fiona Harvey	154	9.2	+9.2
Majority		701	42.0	+19.2
Turnout		1,668	28.0	−1.2
Conservative hold		Swing	+9.7	

=== Warsash ===
Warsash
Party	Candidate	Votes	%	±%
Conservative	Michael Ford	1,397	78.1	+0.5
Labour	Nicola Moore	155	8.7	−5.7
Green	Miles Grindey	138	7.7	+7.7
Liberal Democrats	James Palmer	98	5.5	−2.5
Majority		1259	70.4	+7.2
Turnout		1,788	33.4	−0.1
Conservative hold		Swing	+3.1	

Preceded by 2014 Fareham Council election	Fareham local elections	Succeeded by 2018 Fareham Council election
