= 2004 Fareham Borough Council election =

2004 UK local government election

← 2002	10 June 2004	2006 →

15 of 31 seats to Fareham Borough Council 16 seats needed for a majority
	First party	Second party
Party	Conservative	Liberal Democrats
Seats before	17	13
Seats won	12	3
Seat change	▲4	▼3
Popular vote	18,885	11,185
Percentage	55.4%	32.8%
Swing	▲7.2%	▼4.6%
Council control before election
Conservatives
Council control after election
Conservatives

The 2004 Fareham Council election took place on 10 June 2004 to elect members of Fareham Borough Council in Hampshire, England. Half of the council was up for election, with the Conservative Party increasing their majority.

After the election, the composition of the council was:

- Conservative 22
- Liberal Democrat 9

== Campaign ==
Before the election there were 18 Conservative and 12 Liberal Democrat councillors, with 15 of the 31 seats being contested. One of the 15 seats, in Fareham South ward, was vacant after an independent, former Liberal Democrat, councillor had stepped down, after being fined for false housing and council tax benefit claims. Fareham South was among a number of wards which were reported as being vulnerable to a change in party control including Fareham East, Fareham North, Portchester West, Stubbington and Titchfield Common. A couple of former councillors who had been defeated in the 2002 election stood again, former Labour group leader Mick Prior in Fareham North-West and Conservative Nick Walker in Portchester West.

Issues in the election included council tax levels and plans by the government to build 1,000 houses near Sarisbury. The national issue of the Iraq War was also seen as being likely to sway votes in the election.

== Election results ==
The results saw the Conservatives increase their majority on the council after gaining 3 seats from the Liberal Democrats. Conservative gains included Stubbington where they won by only 8 votes over the Liberal Democrats after a recount and in Portchester West where Nick Walker returned to the council. The Conservatives also gained a seat in Fareham South from an independent in a seat which had previously been seen as strongly Liberal Democrat. The Liberal Democrats partly blamed their defeats on the election being held at the same time as the European elections, while a defeated Labour candidate said their failure to win any seats was in line with the national performance by the party.

Overall turnout increased to 40.3% with a rise in postal votes to 6,000 contributing to the increase.

Fareham local election result 2004
Party	Seats	Gains	Losses	Net gain/loss	Seats %	Votes %	Votes	+/−
Conservative	12	4	0	+4	80.0	55.4	18,885	+7.2
Liberal Democrats	3	0	3	-3	20.0	32.8	11,185	-4.6
Labour	0	0	0	0	0.0	11.1	3,791	-3.2
Green	0	0	0	0	0.0	0.6	206	+0.6
Independent	0	0	1	-1	0.0	0.0	0	-

== Ward results ==
=== Fareham East ===
Fareham East
Party	Candidate	Votes	%	±%
Liberal Democrats	Kathleen Trott	1,171	48.8	
Conservative	Matthew Dartmouth	1,008	42.0	
Labour	Stuart Rose	221	9.2	
Majority		163	6.8	
Turnout		2,400		
Liberal Democrats hold		Swing		

=== Fareham North ===
Fareham North
Party	Candidate	Votes	%	±%
Conservative	John Bryant	1,397	58.3	
Liberal Democrats	Diana East	530	22.1	
Labour	Simon Brown	264	11.0	
Green	David Harrison	206	8.6	
Majority		867	36.2	
Turnout		2,397		
Conservative hold		Swing		

=== Fareham North West ===
Fareham North West
Party	Candidate	Votes	%	±%
Liberal Democrats	Eric Dunn	871	46.6	
Conservative	Evelyn Burley	761	40.7	
Labour	Michael Prior	239	12.8	
Majority		110	5.9	
Turnout		1,871		
Liberal Democrats hold		Swing		

=== Fareham South ===
Fareham South
Party	Candidate	Votes	%	±%
Conservative	Trevor Howard	847	49.8	
Labour	James Carr	445	26.1	
Liberal Democrats	Catherine Hester	410	24.1	
Majority		402	23.7	
Turnout		1,702		
Conservative gain from Independent		Swing		

=== Fareham West ===
Fareham West
Party	Candidate	Votes	%	±%
Conservative	Diana Harrison	1,664	67.0	
Liberal Democrats	Doreen Baker	559	22.5	
Labour	Cameron Crouchman	262	10.5	
Majority		1,105	44.5	
Turnout		2,485		
Conservative hold		Swing		

=== Hill Head ===
Hill Head
Party	Candidate	Votes	%	±%
Conservative	Timothy Knight	1,875	68.0	
Liberal Democrats	Victoria Latimer	658	23.9	
Labour	Janet Gay	224	8.1	
Majority		1,217	44.1	
Turnout		2,757		
Conservative hold		Swing		

=== Locks Heath ===
Locks Heath
Party	Candidate	Votes	%	±%
Conservative	Ruth Godrich	1,359	62.9	
Liberal Democrats	Sharon Englefield	574	26.6	
Labour	Angela Carr	227	10.5	
Majority		785	36.3	
Turnout		2,160		
Conservative hold		Swing		

=== Park Gate ===
Park Gate
Party	Candidate	Votes	%	±%
Conservative	Marian Ellerton	1,234	67.9	
Liberal Democrats	Christine Savage	356	19.6	
Labour	Nicholas Knight	228	12.5	
Majority		878	48.3	
Turnout		1,818		
Conservative hold		Swing		

=== Portchester East ===
Portchester East
Party	Candidate	Votes	%	±%
Liberal Democrats	David Norris	1,889	52.8	
Conservative	Bernard Munden	1,190	33.2	
Labour	Richard Ryan	501	14.0	
Majority		699	19.6	
Turnout		3,580		
Liberal Democrats hold		Swing		

=== Portchester West ===
Portchester West
Party	Candidate	Votes	%	±%
Conservative	Nicholas Walker	1,220	50.2	
Liberal Democrats	Stephen Clark	995	40.9	
Labour	Leslie Ricketts	216	8.9	
Majority		225	9.3	
Turnout		2,431		
Conservative gain from Liberal Democrats		Swing		

=== Sarisbury ===
Sarisbury
Party	Candidate	Votes	%	±%
Conservative	David Swanbrow	1,283	71.9	
Liberal Democrats	Mark Christie	338	18.9	
Labour	Clive Coldwell	163	9.1	
Majority		945	53.0	
Turnout		1,784		
Conservative hold		Swing		

=== Stubbington ===
Stubbington
Party	Candidate	Votes	%	±%
Conservative	Kay Mandry	1,190	47.0	
Liberal Democrats	James Forrest	1,182	46.6	
Labour	Michael Taylor	162	6.4	
Majority		8	0.4	
Turnout		2,534		
Conservative gain from Liberal Democrats		Swing		

=== Titchfield ===
Titchfield
Party	Candidate	Votes	%	±%
Conservative	Francis Devonshire	1,362	64.9	
Liberal Democrats	Jennifer Chaloner	483	23.0	
Labour	Alan Mayes	253	12.1	
Majority		879	41.9	
Turnout		2,098		
Conservative hold		Swing		

=== Titchfield Common ===
Titchfield Common
Party	Candidate	Votes	%	±%
Conservative	Keith Evans	986	51.1	
Liberal Democrats	David Savage	771	40.0	
Labour	Andrew Mooney	171	8.9	
Majority		215	11.1	
Turnout		1,928		
Conservative gain from Liberal Democrats		Swing		

=== Warsash ===
Warsash
Party	Candidate	Votes	%	±%
Conservative	Mary Nadolski	1,509	71.1	
Liberal Democrats	Alice Herron	398	18.8	
Labour	Brenda Caines	215	10.1	
Majority		1,111	52.3	
Turnout		2,122		
Conservative hold		Swing		

Preceded by 2002 Fareham Council election	Fareham local elections	Succeeded by 2006 Fareham Council election
