= 2012 Fareham Borough Council election =

Election in Hampshire, England

← 2010	3 May 2012	2014 →

15 of 31 seats to Fareham Borough Council 16 seats needed for a majority
	First party	Second party
Party	Conservative	Liberal Democrats
Seats before	22	9
Seats won	13	2
Seat change	▲1	▼1
Popular vote	15,513	7,510
Percentage	52.7%	25.5%
Swing	▲4.3%	▼13.5%
Council control before election
Conservatives
Council control after election
Conservatives

The 2012 Fareham Borough Council elections took take place on 3 May 2012 to elect half the members of Fareham Borough Council in Hampshire, England. The Conservative Party are currently the largest party on the council.

The Conservative Party held every seat they defended and gained one from the Lib Dems, in Fareham North West, which saw Dave Whittingham unseat Eric Dunn.

The closest to an upset came in Stubbington where 22-year-old Christopher Wood for the UK Independence Party came second with 34.4% of the vote, behind the Conservative's Kay Mandry, who won 38.8%.

After the election, the composition of the council was:

- Conservative 24
- Liberal Democrat 6
- Independent 1

== Election results ==
The election saw the Conservatives retain control of the council after winning 13 seats compared to 2 for the Liberal Democrats.

Fareham local election result 2012
Party	Seats	Gains	Losses	Net gain/loss	Seats %	Votes %	Votes	+/−
Conservative	13	1	0	0	86.7	52.7	15,513	+4.3%
Liberal Democrats	2	0	1	0	13.3	25.5	7,510	-13.5%
Labour	0	0	0	0	0	14.5	4,282	+4.3%
UKIP	0	0	0	0	0	5.4	1,584	+4.4%
Green	0	0	0	0	0	1.9	566	+1.0%

== Ward results ==
=== Fareham East ===
Fareham East
Party	Candidate	Votes	%	±%
Liberal Democrats	Katrina Trott	1,304	59.9	+11.2
Conservative	Keith Barton	635	29.1	−16.2
Labour	Conor Morris	239	11.0	+5.0
Majority		669	30.7	+27.3
Turnout		2,178	37.5	−3.7
Liberal Democrats hold		Swing		

=== Fareham North ===
Fareham North
Party	Candidate	Votes	%	±%
Conservative	John Bryant	1,175	58.2	−14.1
Liberal Democrats	Peter Trott	365	18.1	+5.3
Labour	Stuart Rose	252	12.4	+4.9
Green	David Harrison	228	11.3	+3.9
Majority		810	40.1	−19.4
Turnout		2,020	35.9	−6.3
Conservative hold		Swing		

=== Fareham North West ===
Fareham North West
Party	Candidate	Votes	%	±%
Conservative	David Whittingham	573	36.2	−4.1
Liberal Democrats	Jim Palmer	547	34.6	−18.3
Labour	Michael Prior	249	15.7	+8.9
UKIP	Bob Ingram	214	13.5	+13.5
Majority		26	1.6	+1.6
Turnout		1,583	28.2	−7.2
Conservative gain from Liberal Democrats		Swing		

=== Fareham South ===
Fareham South
Party	Candidate	Votes	%	±%
Conservative	Trevor Howard	699	46.8	−12.4
Labour	James Carr	471	31.5	+14.5
Green	John Vivian	204	13.7	+5.4
Liberal Democrats	Gina Dungworth	119	8.0	−7.8
Majority		228	15.3	−26.9
Turnout		1,493	27.5	−5.5
Conservative hold		Swing		

=== Fareham West ===
Fareham West
Party	Candidate	Votes	%	±%
Conservative	Nick Gregory	1,138	54.3	−14.1
Liberal Democrats	Rowena Palmer	399	19.0	+5.8
UKIP	Steve Richards	332	15.9	+3.2
Labour	Cameron Crouchman	226	15.9	+5.1
Majority		739	35.3	−19.9
Turnout		2,095	38.6	−7.4
Conservative hold		Swing		

=== Hill Head ===
Hill Head
Party	Candidate	Votes	%	±%
Conservative	Tim Knight	1,608	67.1	−7.0
Liberal Democrats	Sandra Abrams	465	19.4	−1.4
Labour	Nicholas Knight	325	13.5	+8.5
Majority		1,143	47.7	−5.6
Turnout		2,398	39.9	−8.6
Conservative hold		Swing		

=== Locks Heath ===
Locks Heath
Party	Candidate	Votes	%	±%
Conservative	Keith Evans	1,135	63.5	+3.1
Liberal Democrats	Hugh Pritchard	347	19.4	−+6.9
Labour	Angela Carr	304	17.1	+11.1
Majority		788	44.1	+4.8
Turnout		1,786	31.6	−8.1
Conservative hold		Swing		

=== Park Gate ===
Park Gate
Party	Candidate	Votes	%	±%
Conservative	Marian Ellerton	1,042	64.5	−11.5
Labour	Helen Price	360	22.2	+13.9
Liberal Democrats	Lizette Van Niekirk	215	13.3	−2.4
Majority		682	42.2	−18.1
Turnout		1617	27.2	−5.7
Conservative hold		Swing		

=== Portchester East ===
Portchester East
Party	Candidate	Votes	%	±%
Liberal Democrats	David Norris	1,516	54.2	+2.8
Conservative	Alison Walker	791	28.2	−1.9
Labour	Richard Ryan	492	17.6	+8.3
Majority		725	25.9	+4.6
Turnout		2,799	31.8	−8.2
Liberal Democrats hold		Swing		

=== Portchester West ===
Portchester West
Party	Candidate	Votes	%	±%
Conservative	Nick Walker	997	50.2	−10.0
Liberal Democrats	Bob Gray	431	21.6	−5.4
Labour	Les Ricketts	220	11.1	+4.4
UKIP	Pete White	205	10.4	+10.4
Green	Rosemary Byatt	134	6.7	+6.7
Majority		566	28.5	−5.7
Turnout		1987	31.5	−9.3
Conservative hold		Swing		

=== Sarisbury ===
Sarisbury
Party	Candidate	Votes	%	±%
Conservative	David Swanbrow	1,238	75.6	−7.0
Labour	Ian Pike	241	14.5	+9
Liberal Democrats	Brenda Caines	262	10.9	−2
Majority		997	60.1	−8.6
Turnout		1,659	29.8	−9.4
Conservative hold		Swing		

=== Stubbington ===
Stubbington
Party	Candidate	Votes	%	±%
Conservative	Kay Mandry	940	38.8	−16.5
UKIP	Christopher Wood	833	34.4	+34.4
Liberal Democrats	Craig Lewis	650	26.8	−14.5
Majority		107	4.4	−9.5
Turnout		2,423	42.8	−4.3
Conservative hold		Swing		

=== Titchfield ===
Titchfield
Party	Candidate	Votes	%	±%
Conservative	Tiffany Harper	1,238	67.4	−4.7
Labour	Simon Brown	350	19.1	+11.1
Liberal Democrats	David Leonard	248	13.5	−0.8
Majority		888	48.4	−9.4
Turnout		1,836	31.8	−7.3
Conservative hold		Swing		

=== Titchfield Common ===
Titchfield Common
Party	Candidate	Votes	%	±%
Conservative	Sarah Pankhurst	873	52.7	+2.2
Liberal Democrats	Sue Hardie	496	30.0	−16.6
Labour	Andrew Mooney	287	17.3	+14.4
Majority		377	22.8	+18.9
Turnout		1656	29.2	−9.3
Conservative hold		Swing		

=== Warsash ===
Warsash
Party	Candidate	Votes	%	±%
Conservative	Michael Ford	1,431	77.6	−3.6
Labour	Nicola Moore	266	14.4	+9.2
Liberal Democrats	Deborah Hughes	146	8.0	−0.8
Majority		1,165	63.2	−9.3
Turnout		1,843	33.5	−6.6
Conservative hold		Swing		

Preceded by 2010 Fareham Council election	Fareham local elections	Succeeded by 2014 Fareham Council election
