= 2002 Fareham Borough Council election =

2002 UK local government election

- 2 May 2002

All 31 seats to Fareham Borough Council 16 seats needed for a majority
	First party	Second party
Party	Conservative	Liberal Democrats
Seats before	29	11
Seats won	17 (17 total)	14 (14 total)
Seat change	▼12	▲3
Popular vote	29,673	23,067
Percentage	48%	37%
Swing	▼9.5%	▲10.3%
Council control before election
Conservatives
Council control after election
Conservatives

The 2002 Fareham Council election took place on 2 May 2002 to elect members of Fareham Borough Council in Hampshire, England. The whole council was up for election with ward boundary changes since the last election in 2000 reducing the number of seats by 11. The Conservative Party stayed in overall control of the council.

== Candidates ==
All of the seats were contested after the wards had been re-organised. Every ward was contested by the Conservative and Liberal Democrat parties, with Labour standing in every ward but one, and also 1 English Independence Party candidate.

== Election results ==
The results saw the Conservatives remain in control of the council with a reduced majority on 17 seats, compared to 14 for the Liberal Democrats. The Conservatives lost a number of councillors, which they blamed on the boundary changes, while the Liberal Democrats were pleased with the gains they had made. The Liberal Democrat gains also saw the last 2 Labour councillors lose their seats, with the Labour leader Mark Prior losing in Fareham South. Overall turnout was the highest since 1996 at 35.68%.

Fareham local election result 2002
Party	Seats	Gains	Losses	Net gain/loss	Seats %	Votes %	Votes	+/−
Conservative	17			-12	54.8	48.2	29,673	-9.5
Liberal Democrats	14			+3	45.2	37.4	23,067	+10.3
Labour	0			-2	0.0	14.3	8,799	-0.9
English Independence Party	0			0	0.0	0.1	83	+0.1

After the previous election and immediately prior to this election, the composition of the council was:

↓
29

69.04%

Conservative
11

26.19%

Liberal Democrats
2 4.76%
Labour

After the election result, with new wards the composition of the council became:

↓
17

54.83%

Conservative
14

45.16%

Liberal Democrats

== Ward results ==
=== Fareham East ===
Fareham East (2)
Party	Candidate	Votes	%	±%
Liberal Democrats	Donald Murray	1,070	48.74	
Liberal Democrats	Kathleen Trott	919		
Conservative	Raymond Ellis	842	38.35	
Conservative	Peter Sandy	722		
Labour	Simon Brown	200	9.11	
Labour	Edgar Webb	195		
English Independence Party	Michael Ball	83	3.78	
Turnout		4,031		

=== Fareham North ===
Fareham North (2)
Party	Candidate	Votes	%	±%
Conservative	Pamela Bryant	1,141	58.93	
Conservative	John Bryant	1,130		
Liberal Democrats	Eve Aldridge	559	28.87	
Liberal Democrats	Peter Munday	463		
Labour	Alan Mayes	236	12.19	
Labour	Stephen McCloskey	197		
Turnout		3,726		

=== Fareham North West ===
Fareham North West (2)
Party	Candidate	Votes	%	±%
Liberal Democrats	Peter Davies	699	41.16	
Liberal Democrats	Catherine Hester	628		
Conservative	Evelyn Burley	603	35.51	
Conservative	Richard Henderson	595		
Labour	Angela Carr	396	23.32	
Labour	Nicholas Knight	335		
Turnout		3,256		

=== Fareham South ===
Fareham South (2)
Party	Candidate	Votes	%	±%
Liberal Democrats	David Leonard	693	40.33	
Liberal Democrats	Hugh Pritchard	676		
Conservative	Dennis Steadman	535	31.14	
Conservative	Trevor Howard	495		
Labour	Michael Prior	490	28.52	
Labour	James Carr	465		
Turnout		3,354		

=== Fareham West ===
Fareham West (2)
Party	Candidate	Votes	%	±%
Conservative	Leslie Keeble	1,478	64.48	
Conservative	Diana Harrison	1,470		
Liberal Democrats	Robert Cox	470	20.50	
Labour	Timothy Brewer	344	15.00	
Liberal Democrats	Luke Slough	343		
Labour	Wilfred Phillips	331		
Turnout		4,436		

=== Hill Head ===
Hill Head (2)
Party	Candidate	Votes	%	±%
Conservative	Arthur Mandry	1,362	55.52	
Conservative	Timothy Knight	1,349		
Liberal Democrats	Megan Chapman	835	34.03	
Liberal Democrats	Peter Chapman	828		
Labour	Jane Christie	256	10.43	
Labour	Janet Gay	225		
Turnout		4,855		

=== Locks Heath ===
Locks Heath (2)
Party	Candidate	Votes	%	±%
Conservative	Michael Godrich	1,019	57.15	
Conservative	Ruth Godrich	996		
Liberal Democrats	Sharon Englefield	473	26.52	
Liberal Democrats	Christine Savage	413		
Labour	Tracey Malizis	291	16.32	
Labour	Andrew Mooney	262		
Turnout		3,454		

=== Park Gate ===
Park Gate (2)
Party	Candidate	Votes	%	±%
Conservative	Brian Bayford	932	65.49	
Conservative	Marian Ellerton	918		
Labour	Joyce Bond	261	18.34	
Labour	Brenda Caines	244		
Liberal Democrats	Jennifer Chaloner	230	16.16	
Liberal Democrats	Anthony Smale	185		
Turnout		2,770		

=== Portchester East ===
Portchester East (3)
Party	Candidate	Votes	%	±%
Liberal Democrats	Roger Price	2,222	61.01	
Liberal Democrats	Joan Eastman	1,931		
Liberal Democrats	David Norris	1,921		
Conservative	Robert Alexander	732	20.09	
Conservative	Eileen Green	709		
Labour	Richard Ryan	688	18.89	
Conservative	Susan Walker	644		
Labour	Stuart Rose	616		
Labour	Leslie Ricketts	530		
Turnout		9,993		

=== Portchester West ===
Portchester West (2)
Party	Candidate	Votes	%	±%
Conservative	Ernest Crouch	969	18.89	
Liberal Democrats	Stephen Clark	883	41.51	
Conservative	Nicholas Walker	867		
Liberal Democrats	Eleanor Murray	794		
Labour	Cameron Crouchman	275	12.92	
Labour	James Webb	258		
Turnout		4,046		

=== Sarisbury ===
Sarisbury (2)
Party	Candidate	Votes	%	±%
Conservative	Sean Woodward	1,306	78.96	
Conservative	David Swanbrow	1,255		
Liberal Democrats	Vanessa Christie	348	21.03	
Liberal Democrats	Mark Christie	345		
Turnout		3,254		

=== Stubbington ===
Stubbington (2)
Party	Candidate	Votes	%	±%
Liberal Democrats	Dorrine Burton-Jenkins	1,276	53.93	
Liberal Democrats	James Forrest	1,063		
Conservative	Rosemary Pockley	923	39.01	
Conservative	Gordan Coggan	913		
Labour	Ian Christie	167	7.05	
Labour	Michael Taylor	165		
Turnout		4,507		

=== Titchfield ===
Titchfield
Party	Candidate	Votes	%	±%
Conservative	Constance Hockley	1,137	65.04	
Conservative	Francis Devonshire	1,123		
Labour	Karen Postle	314	17.96	
Labour	Francis Allison	313		
Liberal Democrats	Patricia Munday	297	16.99	
Liberal Democrats	Peter Rudwick	257		
Turnout		3,441		

=== Titchfield Common ===
Titchfield Common (2)
Party	Candidate	Votes	%	±%
Liberal Democrats	Jonathan Englefield	874	50.57	
Liberal Democrats	David Savage	778		
Conservative	Keith Evans	612	35.41	
Conservative	Malcolm Harper	551		
Labour	James Malizis	242	14.00	
Labour	Jonathan Watkins	133		
Turnout		3,190		

=== Warsash ===
Warsash (2)
Party	Candidate	Votes	%	±%
Conservative	Trevor Cartwright	1,194	69.86	
Conservative	Mary Nadolski	1,151		
Liberal Democrats	Kevin Byrne	308	18.02	
Liberal Democrats	Alice Herron	286		
Labour	Simon Holford	207	12.11	
Labour	Wendy Ledger	163		
Turnout		3,309		

Preceded by 2000 Fareham Council election	Fareham local elections	Succeeded by 2004 Fareham Council election
