= 2021 Fareham Borough Council election =

2021 UK local government election

- 6 May 2021

Half of seats (15 of 31) to Fareham Borough Council 16 seats needed for a majority
| | First party | Second party |
|---|---|---|
| Leader | Seán Woodward | Roger Price |
| Party | Conservative | Liberal Democrats |
| Seats won | 13 (23 total) | 2 (5 total) |
| Seat change | ▲1 | 0 |
| Percentage | 56% | 22% |
| Swing | ▲4% | ▼2% |

Elections to Fareham Borough Council took place on 6 May 2021, as part of the 2021 United Kingdom local elections. These elections were originally scheduled for 2020 but were suspended for a year due to the COVID-19 pandemic.

Following the previous elections, in 2018 the council consisted of 24 Conservatives, 5 Liberal Democrats, 1 Independent member and 1 UKIP member. Since the Conservatives regained majority control of the council in 1999, the Liberal Democrats had formed the main opposition.

== Background ==
In January 2020, opposition Liberal Democrat councillor Shaun Cunningham left the party to sit as an independent citing the party's poor general election results. Two months later, in March 2020, two Conservative councillors, Leslie Keeble and Keith Barton left their party. These three councillors alongside the other independent councillor Jack Englefield and the former UKIP councillor, Carolyn Heneghan, formed a new independent opposition group. In late March 2021, a dispute between council leader Sean Woodward and Geoff Fazackarley led to Fazackarley also parting with the Conservatives and joining the independent opposition group. With six members, this group has replaced the four-strong Liberal Democrat group as the main opposition on the council.

The Statement of Persons Nominated was published on 9 April 2021.

== Results ==
2021 Fareham Borough Council election
| Party | This election | | | | Full council | | | This election | | |
| Party | Candidates | Seats | Net | Seats % | Other | Total | Total % | Votes | Votes % | +/− |
|---|---|---|---|---|---|---|---|---|---|---|
| Conservative | {{{candidates}}} | 13 | ▲1 | 86.7 | 10 | 23 | 74.2 | 20,374 | 56.2 | +2.1 |
| Liberal Democrats | {{{candidates}}} | 2 | Steady | 13.3 | 3 | 5 | 16.1 | 7,984 | 22.0 | -6.4 |
| Independent | {{{candidates}}} | 0 | Steady | 0.0 | 3 | 3 | 9.7 | 2,798 | 7.7 | +4.2 |
| Labour | {{{candidates}}} | 0 | Steady | 0.0 | 0 | 0 | 0.0 | 4,472 | 12.3 | -0.6 |
| Green | {{{candidates}}} | 0 | Steady | 0.0 | 0 | 0 | 0.0 | 477 | 1.3 | +0.4 |
| Reform | {{{candidates}}} | 0 | Steady | 0.0 | 0 | 0 | 0.0 | 87 | 0.2 | New |
| Workers Party | {{{candidates}}} | 0 | Steady | 0.0 | 0 | 0 | 0.0 | 63 | 0.2 | New |
| UKIP | {{{candidates}}} | 0 | ▼1 | 0.0 | 0 | 0 | 0.0 | N/A | N/A | -0.2 |

== Results by Ward ==
=== Fareham East ===
Fareham East
| Party | Candidate | Votes | % | ±% |
|---|---|---|---|---|
| Liberal Democrats | Katrina Kathleen Trott* | 1,204 | 47.1 | −8.2 |
| Conservative | Stephen Paul Ingram | 950 | 37.2 | +4.7 |
| Labour | Gemma Oughton | 296 | 11.6 | −0.6 |
| Independent | Paul Sturgess | 105 | 4.1 | +4.1 |
| Majority | | 254 | 9.9 | −12.9 |
| Turnout | | 2,555 | | |
| Liberal Democrats hold | | Swing | -6.5 | |

=== Fareham North ===
Fareham North
| Party | Candidate | Votes | % | ±% |
|---|---|---|---|---|
| Conservative | Louise Elizabeth Clubley* | 1,121 | 49.9 | −1.9 |
| Independent | Jean Wigmore | 536 | 23.9 | +23.9 |
| Liberal Democrats | Ciaran Urry-Tuttiett | 206 | 9.2 | −17.4 |
| Labour | Nicholas John Knight | 205 | 9.1 | −3.2 |
| Green | David Barton Harrison | 178 | 7.9 | −1.4 |
| Majority | | 585 | 26.0 | +0.9 |
| Turnout | | 2,246 | | |
| Conservative hold | | Swing | -12.9 | |

=== Fareham North West ===
Fareham North West
| Party | Candidate | Votes | % | ±% |
|---|---|---|---|---|
| Conservative | Fred Birkett* | 1,009 | 55.9 | +12.3 |
| Independent | Jan Mondey | 309 | 17.1 | +17.1 |
| Labour | Gemma Furnivall | 305 | 16.9 | +1.2 |
| Liberal Democrats | Dominic Leung Yan Wong | 181 | 10.0 | +0.7 |
| Majority | | 700 | 38.8 | +18.4 |
| Turnout | | 1,804 | | |
| Conservative hold | | Swing | -2.1 | |

=== Fareham South ===
Fareham South
| Party | Candidate | Votes | % | ±% |
|---|---|---|---|---|
| Conservative | Nick Gregory | 802 | 46.0 | +2.0 |
| Labour | Andrew Peter Mooney | 361 | 20.7 | −0.9 |
| Independent | Keith Alexander Barton* | 238 | 13.6 | −30.4 |
| Liberal Democrats | James Fowler | 194 | 11.1 | +1.6 |
| Green | Nick Lyle | 150 | 8.6 | +8.6 |
| Majority | | 441 | 32.3 | +13.3 |
| Turnout | | 1,745 | | |
| Conservative hold | | Swing | +1.5 | |

Keith Barton (Independent) was the leader of the Independent Group (6 councillors) on Fareham Council.

=== Fareham West ===
Fareham West
| Party | Candidate | Votes | % | ±% |
|---|---|---|---|---|
| Conservative | Tina Lesley Ellis* | 1,571 | 67.0 | −2.9 |
| Liberal Democrats | Rowena Rose | 311 | 13.3 | −1.6 |
| Labour | Verden Alluin Meldrum | 228 | 9.7 | −5.5 |
| Green | John Peter Vivian | 149 | 6.4 | +6.4 |
| Reform | Steve Richards | 87 | 3.7 | +3.7 |
| Majority | | 1,260 | 53.7 | −0.9 |
| Turnout | | 2,346 | | |
| Conservative hold | | Swing | -0.7 | |

=== Hill Head ===
Hill Head
| Party | Candidate | Votes | % | ±% |
|---|---|---|---|---|
| Conservative | Kay Mandry* | 1,720 | 59.5 | +7.8 |
| Liberal Democrats | David John Hamilton | 710 | 24.6 | +13.3 |
| Labour | Ivan Lincoln Gray | 292 | 10.1 | +2.9 |
| Independent | Gerald Clayton Drabble | 170 | 5.9 | +5.9 |
| Majority | | 1,010 | 34.9 | +13.2 |
| Turnout | | 2,892 | | |
| Conservative hold | | Swing | -2.8 | |

=== Locks Heath ===
Locks Heath
| Party | Candidate | Votes | % | ±% |
|---|---|---|---|---|
| Conservative | Malcolm Roy Daniells | 1,614 | 69.4 | −2.8 |
| Labour | Angela Carr | 392 | 16.9 | +1.9 |
| Liberal Democrats | Darren Alderson-Hall | 318 | 13.7 | +13.7 |
| Majority | | 1,226 | 52.6 | −4.7 |
| Turnout | | 2,324 | | |
| Conservative hold | | Swing | -2.4 | |

=== Park Gate ===
Park Gate
| Party | Candidate | Votes | % | ±% |
|---|---|---|---|---|
| Conservative | Simon David Martin* | 1,440 | 56.7 | −9.8 |
| Labour | John Michael Boyle | 396 | 15.6 | −3.2 |
| Liberal Democrats | Graham Stanley Everdell | 366 | 14.4 | +14.4 |
| Independent | Bob Murphy | 276 | 10.9 | +10.9 |
| Workers Party | David George William Gilbert Smith | 63 | 2.5 | +2.5 |
| Majority | | 1,044 | 41.1 | −6.6 |
| Turnout | | 2,541 | | |
| Conservative hold | | Swing | -3.3 | |

=== Portchester East ===
Portchester East
| Party | Candidate | Votes | % | ±% |
|---|---|---|---|---|
| Liberal Democrats | Jean Kelly | 1,569 | 44.4 | −1.1 |
| Conservative | Melojane Herbert | 1,417 | 40.1 | +1.3 |
| Labour | Richard Edward Ryan | 402 | 11.4 | −4.3 |
| Independent | Trevor Alford | 145 | 4.1 | −34.7 |
| Majority | | 152 | 4.3 | −2.4 |
| Turnout | | 3,533 | | |
| Liberal Democrats hold | | Swing | -1.2 | |

=== Portchester West ===
Portchester West
| Party | Candidate | Votes | % | ±% |
|---|---|---|---|---|
| Conservative | Nicholas John Walker* | 1,211 | 54.2 | +2.1 |
| Liberal Democrats | Ashley Stephen Brown | 788 | 35.3 | −2.6 |
| Labour | Leslie Charles Ricketts | 235 | 10.5 | +0.6 |
| Majority | | 423 | 18.9 | +4.7 |
| Turnout | | 2,234 | | |
| Conservative hold | | Swing | +2.4 | |

=== Sarisbury ===
Sarisbury
| Party | Candidate | Votes | % | ±% |
|---|---|---|---|---|
| Conservative | Joanne Bull | 1,529 | 60.5 | −11.1 |
| Independent | Geoffrey Ian Townley | 417 | 16.5 | +16.5 |
| Liberal Democrats | Peter Davison | 335 | 13.3 | −1.7 |
| Labour | James Michael Webb | 245 | 9.7 | −3.7 |
| Majority | | 1,112 | 47.3 | −9.4 |
| Turnout | | 2,526 | | |
| Conservative hold | | Swing | -13.8 | |

=== Stubbington ===
Stubbington
| Party | Candidate | Votes | % | ±% |
|---|---|---|---|---|
| Conservative | Pal Kaur Hayre | 1,443 | 54.6 | +24.5 |
| Liberal Democrats | Jimmy Roberts | 834 | 31.5 | +1.5 |
| Labour | Tom Fowler | 196 | 7.4 | +2.6 |
| Independent | Carolyn Heneghan* | 171 | 6.5 | −28.5 |
| Majority | | 609 | 23.0 | +18.1 |
| Turnout | | 2,644 | | |
| Conservative gain from UKIP | | Swing | +11.5 | |

=== Titchfield ===
Titchfield
| Party | Candidate | Votes | % | ±% |
|---|---|---|---|---|
| Conservative | Tiffany Georgina Harper* | 1,579 | 69.2 | +1.5 |
| Liberal Democrats | Justin Grimley | 368 | 16.1 | +0.1 |
| Labour | Michael Alan Prior | 336 | 14.7 | −1.6 |
| Majority | | 1,211 | 53.0 | +1.6 |
| Turnout | | 2,283 | | |
| Conservative hold | | Swing | +0.7 | |

=== Titchfield Common ===
Titchfield Common
| Party | Candidate | Votes | % | ±% |
|---|---|---|---|---|
| Conservative | Sarah Pankhurst* | 1,222 | 56.3 | −3.4 |
| Independent | Aimee Jane White | 431 | 19.9 | +19.9 |
| Labour | James Wilson Carr | 271 | 12.5 | −0.9 |
| Liberal Democrats | Sandra Lynn Abrams | 245 | 11.3 | −6.4 |
| Majority | | 791 | 36.5 | −5.6 |
| Turnout | | 2,169 | | |
| Conservative hold | | Swing | -11.7 | |

=== Warsash ===
Warsash
| Party | Candidate | Votes | % | ±% |
|---|---|---|---|---|
| Conservative | Michael John Ford* | 1,746 | 72.4 | −5.8 |
| Liberal Democrats | Jim Palmer | 355 | 14.7 | +9.2 |
| Labour | Antony John | 312 | 12.9 | +4.3 |
| Majority | | 1,391 | 57.6 | −11.8 |
| Turnout | | 2,413 | | |
| Conservative hold | | Swing | -7.5 | |

| Preceded by 2018 Fareham Council election | Fareham local elections | Succeeded by 2022 Fareham Borough Council election |
