= 2008 Fareham Borough Council election =

2008 UK local government election

← 2006	1 May 2008	2010 →

15 of 31 seats to Fareham Borough Council 16 seats needed for a majority
	First party	Second party
Party	Conservative	Liberal Democrats
Seats before	22	9
Seats won	12	3
Seat change	Steady	Steady
Popular vote	21,206	9,481
Percentage	60.8%	27.2%
Swing	▲9.0%	▼9.8%
Council control before election
Conservatives
Council control after election
Conservatives

The 2008 Fareham Council election took place on 1 May 2008 to elect members of Fareham Borough Council in Hampshire, England. Half of the council was up for election and the Conservative Party stayed in overall control of the council.

After the election, the composition of the council was:

- Conservative 22
- Liberal Democrat 9

== Campaign ==
Before the election the Conservatives held 22 seats compared to 9 for the Liberal Democrats, with the Conservatives having run the council for the previous 9 years. Other candidates stood from the Labour Party, Green Party, United Kingdom Independence Party, British National Party and the English Democrats Party, but the election was seen as being mainly between the Conservatives and Liberal Democrats.

Both the Conservatives and Liberal Democrats pledged to improve parking in Fareham, oppose a proposed gravel extraction site and build less new houses. The Conservatives defended their record in control of the council pointing to low council tax rates, extra hours of free bus travel for pensioners and recycling at 46% of waste. However the Liberal Democrats promised to revert to weekly rubbish collection instead of the fortnightly service that was introduced in 2005, improve street cleaning and scrap a fee for calling out pest controllers.

== Election result ==
The results saw no seats change hands with the Conservatives keeping control with a majority of 13. The Conservatives held 12 seats, many with increased majorities, the Liberal Democrats held 3, while Labour failed to win any seats and came last in many wards. The largest majority was in Sarisbury where the Conservatives won over 82% of the vote, while the closest results came in Stubbington and Fareham East, with the Liberal Democrats holding Fareham East by 80 votes after a recount. The only ward to see a new councillor was Titchfield where Conservative Tiffany Harper replaced Francis Devonshire, who stepped down at the election. Overall turnout in the election was 40.25%.

Fareham local election result 2008
Party	Seats	Gains	Losses	Net gain/loss	Seats %	Votes %	Votes	+/−
Conservative	12	0	0	0	80.0	60.8	21,206	+9.0%
Liberal Democrats	3	0	0	0	20.0	27.2	9,481	-9.8%
Labour	0	0	0	0	0	6.8	2,355	-1.3%
Independent	0	0	0	0	0	1.3	470	+1.3%
Green	0	0	0	0	0	1.3	436	-0.4%
UKIP	0	0	0	0	0	1.2	422	+0.8%
BNP	0	0	0	0	0	0.9	323	-0.1%
English Democrat	0	0	0	0	0	0.5	167	+0.5%

== Ward results ==
=== Fareham East ===
Fareham East
Party	Candidate	Votes	%	±%
Liberal Democrats	Katrina Trott	1,143	48.7	−1.7
Conservative	Keith Barton	1,063	45.3	+2.4
Labour	Stuart Rose	140	6.0	−0.8
Majority		80	3.4	−4.1
Turnout		2,346	41.2	−0.9
Liberal Democrats hold		Swing		

=== Fareham North ===
Fareham North
Party	Candidate	Votes	%	±%
Conservative	John Bryant	1,714	72.3	+5.7
Liberal Democrats	Doreen Baker	304	12.8	−3.2
Labour	Alan Mayes	178	7.5	−0.1
Green	David Harrison	175	7.4	−2.4
Majority		1,410	59.5	+8.9
Turnout		2,371	41.9	−0.1
Conservative hold		Swing		

=== Fareham North West ===
Fareham North West
Party	Candidate	Votes	%	±%
Liberal Democrats	Eric Dunn	1,020	52.9	−11.1
Conservative	Sheila Tavendale	778	40.3	+12.0
Labour	Angela Carr	131	6.8	−0.9
Majority		242	12.5	−23.2
Turnout		1,929	35.4	−0.6
Liberal Democrats hold		Swing		

=== Fareham South ===
Fareham South
Party	Candidate	Votes	%	±%
Conservative	Trevor Howard	1,015	59.2	+8.2
Labour	James Carr	291	17.0	−2.5
Liberal Democrats	Rowena Leonard	270	15.8	−13.7
Green	John Vivian	138	8.1	+8.1
Majority		724	42.2	+20.7
Turnout		1,714	33.0	−0.8
Conservative hold		Swing		

=== Fareham West ===
Fareham West
Party	Candidate	Votes	%	±%
Conservative	Diana Harrison	1,715	68.4	−2.9
Liberal Democrats	John Tims	331	13.2	−6.8
UKIP	Steve Richards	318	12.7	+12.7
Labour	Cameron Crouchman	144	5.7	−3.0
Majority		1,384	55.2	+3.9
Turnout		2,508	46.0	+0.1
Conservative hold		Swing		

=== Hill Head ===
Hill Head
Party	Candidate	Votes	%	±%
Conservative	Tim Knight	2,133	74.1	+11.2
Liberal Democrats	Sandra Abrams	599	20.8	−4.0
Labour	Wendy Ledger	145	5.0	−0.7
Majority		1,534	53.3	+15.2
Turnout		2,877	48.5	+2.6
Conservative hold		Swing		

=== Locks Heath ===
Locks Heath
Party	Candidate	Votes	%	±%
Conservative	Ruth Godrich	1,344	60.4	−4.9
Independent	Ed Lait	470	21.1	+21.1
Liberal Democrats	David Savage	278	12.5	−13.4
Labour	Nicholas Knight	134	6.0	−2.8
Majority		874	39.3	0.0
Turnout		2,226	39.7	+1.4
Conservative hold		Swing		

=== Park Gate ===
Park Gate
Party	Candidate	Votes	%	±%
Conservative	Marian Ellerton	1,447	76.0	+4.4
Liberal Democrats	Martin Haysom	299	15.7	−2.6
Labour	Joanne Carr	157	8.3	−1.8
Majority		1,148	60.3	+7.0
Turnout		1,903	32.9	−1.5
Conservative hold		Swing		

=== Portchester East ===
Portchester East
Party	Candidate	Votes	%	±%
Liberal Democrats	David Norris	1,802	51.4	
Conservative	Charles Livingstone	1,055	30.1	
Labour	Richard Ryan	326	9.3	
BNP	Roger Knight	323	9.2	
Majority		747	21.3	
Turnout		3,506	40.0	−4.0
Liberal Democrats hold		Swing		

=== Portchester West ===
Portchester West
Party	Candidate	Votes	%	±%
Conservative	Nick Walker	1,410	60.2	+13.1
Liberal Democrats	Carol Bender	609	26.0	−13.8
English Democrat	Alan Chapman	167	7.1	+7.1
Labour	Leslie Ricketts	156	6.7	−0.6
Majority		801	34.2	+26.9
Turnout		2,342	40.8	−3.8
Conservative hold		Swing		

=== Sarisbury ===
Sarisbury
Party	Candidate	Votes	%	±%
Conservative	David Swanbrow	1,657	81.6	+1.3
Liberal Democrats	Christine Savage	262	12.9	+2.3
Labour	Brenda Caines	112	5.5	+1.4
Majority		1,395	68.7	−1.0
Turnout		2,031	39.2	+0.9
Conservative hold		Swing		

=== Stubbington ===
Stubbington
Party	Candidate	Votes	%	±%
Conservative	Kay Mandry	1,485	55.3	+9.2
Liberal Democrats	Craig Lewis	1,111	41.3	−7.4
Labour	Simon Brown	91	3.4	−1.7
Majority		374	14.0	
Turnout		2,687	47.1	+1.6
Conservative hold		Swing		

=== Titchfield ===
Titchfield
Party	Candidate	Votes	%	±%
Conservative	Tiffany Harper	1,599	72.1	+2.0
Liberal Democrats	Jennifer Chaloner	318	14.3	−4.0
Labour	Michael Prior	177	8.0	−3.6
Green	Peter Doggett	123	5.5	+5.5
Majority		1,281	57.8	+5.9
Turnout		2,217	39.1	+0.2
Conservative hold		Swing		

=== Titchfield Common ===
Titchfield Common
Party	Candidate	Votes	%	±%
Conservative	Keith Evans	1,022	50.5	+9.7
Liberal Democrats	Sharon Englefield	944	46.6	−7.4
Labour	Andrew Mooney	59	2.9	−2.3
Majority		78	3.9	
Turnout		2,025	38.5	−1.5
Conservative hold		Swing		

=== Warsash ===
Warsash
Party	Candidate	Votes	%	±%
Conservative	Mary Nadolski	1,769	81.2	+5.2
Liberal Democrats	Alice Herron	191	8.8	−3.3
Labour	Nicola Moore	114	5.2	−0.4
UKIP	John Clayden	104	4.8	+4.8
Majority		1,578	72.5	+8.7
Turnout		2,178	40.1	−0.1
Conservative hold		Swing		

Preceded by 2006 Fareham Council election	Fareham local elections	Succeeded by 2010 Fareham Council election
