= 2026 Fareham Borough Council election =

2026 English local government election

- 7 May 2026

16 out of 32 seats to Fareham Borough Council 17 seats needed for a majority
- Registered: 90,322
- Turnout: 42,678; 47.3%

	First party	Second party	Third party
Leader	Simon Martin	David Hamilton
Party	Conservative	Liberal Democrats	Reform
Last election	22 seats, 45.9%	8 seats, 28.1%
Seats before	24	6	0
Seats won	11	4	1
Seats after	22	7	1
Seat change	Steady	▼1	▲1
	Fourth party	Fifth party
Party	Labour	Independent
Last election	1 seat, 15.2%	1 seat, 5.3%
Seats before	1	1
Seats won	0	0
Seats after	1	1
- Results by ward
Leader before election
Simon Martin
Conservative
Leader after election
Simon Martin
Conservative

The 2026 Fareham Borough Council election was held on 7 May 2026, alongside the other local elections across the United Kingdom being held on the same day, to elect 16 of 32 members of Fareham Borough Council in Hampshire, England.

The Conservatives retained their majority on the council at this election.

Due to ongoing local government reorganisation, this will be the final election to Fareham Borough Council before it is abolished and replaced by a successor unitary authority. Elections to the successor authority are due to take place in 2027.

== Summary ==
=== Background ===
In 2024, the Conservative Party retained control of the council.

=== Council composition ===
After 2024 election		Before 2026 election	
Party	Seats	Party	Seats
Conservative	22	Conservative	24
Liberal Democrats	8	Liberal Democrats	6
Labour	1	Labour	1
Independent	1	Independent	1

Changes 2024–2026:

- December 2024: Lisa Whittle (Liberal Democrats) leaves party to sit as an independent
- February 2025: Paul Whittle (Liberal Democrats) leaves party to sit as an independent
- May 2025: Lisa Whittle (Independent) and Paul Whittle (Independent) join Conservatives

=== Election result ===
2026 Fareham Borough Council election
Party	This election				Full council			This election		
Party	Candidates	Seats	Net	Seats %	Other	Total	Total %	Votes	Votes %	+/−
Conservative	{{{candidates}}}	11	-1	68.8%	11	22	68.8%	16,962	39.0%	
Reform	{{{candidates}}}	1	+1	6.3%	0	1	3.1%	11,185	25.7%	n/a
Liberal Democrats	{{{candidates}}}	4	+0	12.5%	1	7	21.9%	8,703	20.0%	
Green	{{{candidates}}}	0	+0	0.0%	0	0	0.0%	4,216	9.7%	
Labour	{{{candidates}}}	0	+0	0.0%	1	1	3.1%	2,410	5.5%	
Independent	{{{candidates}}}	0	+0	0.0%	1	1	3.1%	0	0.0%	

== Incumbents ==
Ward	Incumbent councillor	Party	Re-standing
Avenue	Roger Bird	Conservative	No
Fareham Park	Lisa Birkett	Conservative	Yes
Fareham Town	Kirsten Wiltshire	Liberal Democrats	Yes
Fort Fareham	Stephen Ingram	Conservative	Yes
Hill Head	Steve Dugan	Conservative	Yes
Hook-with-Warsash	Friar Burgess	Conservative	Yes
Locks Heath	Malcolm Daniells	Conservative	Yes
Park Gate	Simon Martin	Conservative	Yes
Portchester Castle	David Wiltshire	Liberal Democrats	Yes
Portchester Wicor	Paul Whittle	Conservative	Yes
Sarisbury & Whiteley	David Foot	Conservative	No
Stubbington	Jacquie Needham	Conservative	Yes
Titchfield	Tiffany Harper	Conservative	No
Titchfield Common	Andrew Murphy	Conservative	Yes
Uplands & Funtley	Louise Clubley	Conservative	Yes
Wallington & Downend	Alison West	Liberal Democrats	Yes

== Candidates ==
=== Avenue ===
Avenue
Party	Candidate	Votes	%	±%
Conservative	Robert Ellis	1,226	40.3	−12.8
Reform	Paul Kimber	957	31.4	N/A
Liberal Democrats	Maryam Brady	388	12.7	−5.1
Green	Kat Bull	327	10.7	−2.1
Labour	Jamie Webb	146	4.8	−15.2
Majority		269	8.9	−20.4
Turnout		3044	49.3	+12.3
Registered electors				
Conservative hold		Swing		

=== Fareham Park ===
Fareham Park
Party	Candidate	Votes	%	±%
Reform	Kerry Stubbs	850	36.9	N/A
Conservative	Manny Martins	660	28.7	−11.4
Green	Samuel Gething	451	19.2	N/A
Labour	Andy Mooney	340	14.8	−12.8
Majority		190	8.2	−3.5
Turnout		2301	39.4	+10.4
Registered electors				
Reform gain from Conservative		Swing		

=== Fareham Town ===
Fareham Town
Party	Candidate	Votes	%	±%
Liberal Democrats	Kirsten Wiltshire*	762	33.3	−19.2
Reform	Sandy Ellis	636	27.8	n/a
Conservative	Edward Maunder	512	22.4	−2.7
Green	John Vivian	237	10.4	+4.9
Labour	Lee Woods	138	6.0	−10.9
Majority		126	5.5	
Turnout				
Registered electors				
Liberal Democrats hold		Swing		

=== Fort Fareham ===
Fort Fareham
Party	Candidate	Votes	%	±%
Conservative	Stephen Ingram*	734	29.0	−4.1
Reform	Peter Watson	730	28.9	N/A
Labour	Dominic Martin	704	27.8	−9.2
Green	Nick Lyle	362	14.3	+1.9
Majority		4	0.1	−0.2
Turnout		2530	43.3	+11.3
Registered electors				
Conservative hold		Swing		

=== Hill Head ===
Hill Head
Party	Candidate	Votes	%	±%
Conservative	Steve Dugan*	1,516	49.2	+1.2
Reform	George Light	655	21.3	+12.3
Liberal Democrats	Stuart Hayton	392	12.7	−2.2
Labour	Lynne Murray	337	10.9	−16.6
Green	Connor Stephens	179	5.8	N/A
Majority		861	27.9	+11.8
Turnout		3079	52.9	+11.9
Registered electors				
Conservative hold		Swing		

=== Hook-with-Warsash ===
Hook-with-Warsash
Party	Candidate	Votes	%	±%
Conservative	Frair Burgess*	1,355	51.9	−6.1
Reform	Steve Wallace	599	22.9	N/A
Liberal Democrats	Jon Sacker	392	15.0	+0.1
Green	Jake Waterfall	200	7.7	−1.7
Labour	David Rodgers	65	2.5	−14.5
Majority		756	29.0	−6.6
Turnout		2611	51.8	+13.8
Registered electors				
Conservative hold		Swing		

=== Locks Heath ===
Locks Heath
Party	Candidate	Votes	%	±%
Conservative	Malcolm Daniells*	1,286	44.1	−4.1
Reform	Max Barron	716	24.5	N/A
Liberal Democrats	Phil Clark	598	20.5	−2.2
Green	Carole Fogg	319	10.9	−7.1
Majority		570	19.6	+1.6
Turnout		2919	47.5	+11.5
Registered electors				
Conservative hold		Swing		

=== Park Gate ===
Park Gate
Party	Candidate	Votes	%	±%
Conservative	Simon Martin*	1,338	47.3	−2.8
Liberal Democrats	Graham Everdell	707	25.0	−15.9
Reform	Sharon Jones	536	18.9	n/a
Green	Andy Stroud	249	8.8	n/a
Majority		631	22.3	
Turnout		2,830	46	+12
Rejected ballots		7		
Registered electors		6,147		
Conservative hold		Swing	+6.6	

=== Portchester Castle ===
Portchester Castle
Party	Candidate	Votes	%	±%
Liberal Democrats	Dave Wiltshire*	1,101	37.0	
Reform	Sarah Horton	864	29.1	
Conservative	Ashley Grant	688	23.1	
Green	David Palk	209	7.0	
Labour	Richard Ryan	112	3.8	
Majority		237	7.9	
Turnout				
Registered electors				
Liberal Democrats hold		Swing		

=== Portchester Wicor ===
Portchester Wicor
Party	Candidate	Votes	%	±%
Liberal Democrats	Rob Turner	858	33.1	−20.4
Reform	Steven Richards	788	30.4	n/a
Conservative	Paul Whittle*	765	29.5	−3.9
Green	David Harrison	178	6.9	n/a
Majority		70	2.7	−13.5
Turnout				
Registered electors				
Liberal Democrats hold		Swing		

=== Sarisbury & Whiteley ===
Sarisbury & Whiteley
Party	Candidate	Votes	%	±%
Conservative	Ruth Hall	1,613	53.0	−1.5
Reform	Gail Robertson	560	18.4	n/a
Liberal Democrats	Gayathri Sathyanath	536	17.6	−27.9
Green	Polly Sanderson	335	11.0	n/a
Majority		1,053	34.6	
Turnout				
Registered electors				
Conservative hold		Swing		

=== Stubbington ===
Stubbington
Party	Candidate	Votes	%	±%
Conservative	Jacquie Needham*	1,374	47.9	
Reform	Toni Steed	649	22.6	
Liberal Democrats	Fiona Cooke	401	14.0	
Labour	Joseph Adamson	238	8.3	
Green	Kasi Munns	209	7.3	
Majority		725	25.3	
Turnout				
Registered electors				
Conservative hold		Swing		

=== Titchfield ===
Titchfield
Party	Candidate	Votes	%	±%
Conservative	Lisa Birkett*	1,034	39.7	
Reform	Josh Read	716	27.5	
Liberal Democrats	Richard Blythin	437	16.8	
Green	Baz Marie	295	11.3	
Labour	Lorraine Drinkwater	120	4.6	
Majority		318	12.2	
Turnout				
Registered electors				
Conservative hold		Swing		

=== Titchfield Common ===
Titchfield Common
Party	Candidate	Votes	%	±%
Conservative	Andrew Murphy*	1,277	44.7	+16.6
Reform	Gary Fisk	696	24.4	n/a
Liberal Democrats	Sue Hardie	476	16.7	n/a
Green	Naomi Gittens	285	10.0	n/a
Labour	John Boyle	121	4.2	−7.5
Majority		581	20.3	
Turnout				
Registered electors				
Conservative hold		Swing		

=== Uplands & Funtley ===
Uplands & Funtley
Party	Candidate	Votes	%	±%
Conservative	Louise Clubley*	765	37.6	−6.3
Liberal Democrats	Ciaran Urry-Tuttiett	605	29.8	−8.9
Reform	Sandi Watson	494	24.3	n/a
Green	John Rose	168	8.3	−2.5
Majority		160	7.8	
Turnout		2,045	55	+13
Rejected ballots		10		
Registered electors		3,736		
Conservative hold		Swing		

=== Wallington & Downend ===
Wallington & Downend
Party	Candidate	Votes	%	±%
Liberal Democrats	Alison West*	1,050	36.1	−12.7
Conservative	Peter Maunder	819	28.1	−11.4
Reform	Nicky Watkins	739	25.4	n/a
Green	Dawn Rowlatt	213	7.3	+0.7
Labour	Leslie Ricketts	89	3.1	−2.1
Majority		231	8.0	
Turnout				
Registered electors				
Liberal Democrats hold		Swing		

== Post-election changes ==
=== Portchester Wicor by-election ===
Portchester Wicor by-election, 19 November 2026
Party	Candidate	Votes	%	±%
Liberal Democrats	Steve Shaw	980	44.3	+11.2
Reform	Paul Kimber	618	28.0	−2.5
Conservative	Harry Davis	475	21.5	−8.1
Restore	George Ponsford	78	3.5	n/a
Labour	Lorraine Drinkwater	59	2.7	n/a
Majority		362	16.4	+13.7
Turnout		2210	42.2	−6.8
Liberal Democrats hold		Swing	+6.8	
