= 2018 Fareham Borough Council election =

2018 UK local government election

- 3 May 2018

Half of seats (16 of 31) to Fareham Borough Council 16 seats needed for a majority
| | First party | Second party |
|---|---|---|
| Leader | Seán Woodward | Roger Price |
| Party | Conservative | Liberal Democrats |
| Seats won | 12 (24 total) | 3 (5 total) |
| Seat change | ▲1 | Steady |
| Popular vote | 19,529 | 10,247 |
| Percentage | 54.1% | 28.4% |
| Swing | ▲1.7% | ▲4.8% |
- Map showing the results of the election in each ward. Colours denote the winning party as shown in the main table of results.
Council control before election
Conservatives
Council control after election
Conservatives

The 2018 Fareham Borough Council election took place on 3 May 2018 to elect members of Fareham Borough Council in England. This was on the same day as other local elections.

Half of the seats were up for re-election, with each councillor elected for a term of 4 years. The last time these seats were contested was in 2014.

As well as wards in the town of Fareham, candidates were being elected in Hill Head, Locks Heath, Park Gate, Portchester, Titchfield, Sarisbury, Stubbington and Warsash.

The composition of the council was unchanged from prior to these elections, with the Conservatives gaining one seat in Fareham East from the Lib Dems but the Lib Dems gaining one seat in Portchester East from the Conservatives after a previous defection,

After the election, the composition of the council was:

- Conservative 24
- Liberal Democrat 5
- Independent 1
- UKIP 1

== Election results ==
The Conservatives remained in overall control, winning 12 seats. The Liberal Democrats won 3 seats, and an independent won 1 seat.

Fareham Borough Council Election, 2018
| Party | Seats | Gains | Losses | Net gain/loss | Seats % | Votes % | Votes | +/− |
|---|---|---|---|---|---|---|---|---|
| Conservative | 12 | 1 | 0 | +1 | 75.0 | 54.1 | 19,529 | +9.2 |
| Liberal Democrats | 3 | 1 | 1 | 0 | 18.7 | 28.4 | 10,247 | +4.0 |
| Independent | 1 | 0 | 0 | 0 | 6.3 | 3.5 | 1,251 | -2.0 |
| Labour | 0 | 0 | 0 | 0 | 0.0 | 12.9 | 4,660 | +2.3 |
| Green | 0 | 0 | 0 | 0 | 0.0 | 0.9 | 311 | +0.1 |
| UKIP | 0 | 0 | 1 | -1 | 0.0 | 0.2 | 71 | -13.6 |

== Ward results ==
All swings and composition changes calculated from the 2014 elections.

=== Fareham East ===
Fareham East
| Party | Candidate | Votes | % | ±% |
|---|---|---|---|---|
| Conservative | Tom Davies | 1,150 | 49.9 | +12.6 |
| Liberal Democrats | Sean Evans | 790 | 34.2 | −13.8 |
| Labour | Adam Arnold | 367 | 15.9 | +1.2 |
| Majority | | 360 | 15.7 | N/A |
| Turnout | | 2,307 | 39 | +1 |
| Conservative gain from Liberal Democrats | | Swing | +13.2 | |

=== Fareham North ===
Fareham North
| Party | Candidate | Votes | % | ±% |
|---|---|---|---|---|
| Conservative | Pamela Bryant | 1,349 | 63.1 | +21.1 |
| Liberal Democrats | Joe Dalby | 316 | 14.8 | −1.6 |
| Labour | Emma Copeland | 291 | 13.6 | +6.4 |
| Green | David Harrison | 181 | 8.5 | +2.3 |
| Majority | | 1,033 | 48.3 | +23.7 |
| Turnout | | 2,137 | 38 | −3 |
| Conservative hold | | Swing | +11.4 | |

=== Fareham North West ===
Fareham North West
| Party | Candidate | Votes | % | ±% |
|---|---|---|---|---|
| Conservative | Peter Davies | 1,026 | 60.8 | +21.3 |
| Labour | Matthew Randall | 317 | 18.8 | +8.4 |
| Independent | David Whittingham | 197 | 11.7 | +11.7 |
| Liberal Democrats | Benjamin Powell | 146 | 8.7 | −13.8 |
| Majority | | 709 | 42.0 | +25.0 |
| Turnout | | 1,686 | 31 | −2 |
| Conservative hold | | Swing | +6.5 | |

=== Fareham South ===
Fareham South
| Party | Candidate | Votes | % | ±% |
|---|---|---|---|---|
| Conservative | Geoff Fazackarley | 924 | 55.3 | +16.9 |
| Labour | Richard Ryan | 439 | 26.3 | +7.8 |
| Liberal Democrats | James Palmer | 177 | 10.6 | +4.0 |
| Green | Nick Lyle | 130 | 7.8 | +7.8 |
| Majority | | 485 | 29.0 | +19.1 |
| Turnout | | 1670 | 31 | −3 |
| Conservative hold | | Swing | +4.6 | |

=== Fareham West ===
Fareham West
| Party | Candidate | Votes | % | ±% |
|---|---|---|---|---|
| Conservative | Leslie Keeble | 1,659 | 73.4 | +15.7 |
| Labour | Paul King | 321 | 14.2 | +6.9 |
| Liberal Democrats | Rowena Palmer | 280 | 12.4 | +3.5 |
| Majority | | 1,338 | 59.2 | +20.7 |
| Turnout | | 2,260 | 42 | −2 |
| Conservative hold | | Swing | +4.4 | |

=== Hill Head ===
Hill Head
| Party | Candidate | Votes | % | ±% |
|---|---|---|---|---|
| Conservative | Steve Dugan | 1,463 | 54.2 | +1.4 |
| Liberal Democrats | Alex Brims | 1,072 | 39.7 | +31.6 |
| Labour | Kevin Kearslake | 164 | 6.1 | −0.7 |
| Majority | | 391 | 14.5 | −6.0 |
| Turnout | | 2,699 | 45 | −2 |
| Conservative hold | | Swing | -15.1 | |

=== Locks Heath ===
Locks Heath
| Party | Candidate | Votes | % | ±% |
|---|---|---|---|---|
| Conservative | Susan Bayford | 1,581 | 73.3 | −2.0 |
| Labour | Nicholas Knight | 312 | 14.5 | +1.9 |
| Liberal Democrats | Peter Davison | 264 | 12.2 | +0.1 |
| Majority | | 1,269 | 58.8 | −3.9 |
| Turnout | | 2,157 | 38 | − |
| Conservative hold | | Swing | -2.0 | |

=== Park Gate ===
Park Gate
| Party | Candidate | Votes | % | ±% |
|---|---|---|---|---|
| Conservative | Ian Bastable | 1,364 | 68.9 | +3.3 |
| Labour | James Carr | 617 | 31.1 | +9.7 |
| Majority | | 747 | 37.8 | −6.3 |
| Turnout | | 1,981 | 38 | +8 |
| Conservative hold | | Swing | -3.2 | |

=== Portchester East ===
Portchester East (2)
| Party | Candidate | Votes | % | ±% |
|---|---|---|---|---|
| Liberal Democrats | Roger Price | 2,011 | 61.3 | −3.7 |
| Liberal Democrats | Gerry Kelly | 1,791 | 54.6 | −10.4 |
| Conservative | Hugh Sach | 979 | 29.8 | +8.4 |
| Conservative | Callum Wright | 783 | 23.9 | +2.5 |
| Labour | Leslie Ricketts | 338 | 10.3 | −3.3 |
| Labour | Andrew Mooney | 329 | 10.0 | −3.6 |
| Majority | | 812 | 32.7 | −10.9 |
| Turnout | | 3,282 | 37 | −2 |
| Liberal Democrats hold | | Swing | -5.5 | |
| Liberal Democrats hold | | Swing | -5.5 | |

=== Portchester West ===
Portchester West
| Party | Candidate | Votes | % | ±% |
|---|---|---|---|---|
| Conservative | Susan Bell | 1,073 | 49.7 | +14.6 |
| Liberal Democrats | Jean Kelly | 900 | 41.7 | +8.4 |
| Labour | James Webb | 185 | 8.6 | −0.1 |
| Majority | | 173 | 8.0 | +6.2 |
| Turnout | | 2158 | 38 | −4 |
| Conservative hold | | Swing | +3.1 | |

=== Sarisbury ===
Sarisbury
| Party | Candidate | Votes | % | ±% |
|---|---|---|---|---|
| Conservative | Séan Woodward | 1,481 | 71.8 | −4.0 |
| Liberal Democrats | Sophie Foster-Reed | 322 | 15.6 | +1.8 |
| Labour | Melanie Lunn | 259 | 12.6 | +2.2 |
| Majority | | 1,159 | 56.2 | −5.8 |
| Turnout | | 2,062 | 35 | −1 |
| Conservative hold | | Swing | -2.9 | |

=== Stubbington ===
Stubbington By-Election (9 November 2017)
| Party | Candidate | Votes | % | ±% |
|---|---|---|---|---|
| Liberal Democrats | Jim Forrest | 1,185 | 55.2 | +32.4 |
| Conservative | Pal Hayre | 769 | 35.8 | +6.1 |
| UKIP | Andy Annear | 117 | 5.5 | −37.9 |
| Labour | Matthew Randall | 76 | 3.5 | −0.5 |
| Majority | | 416 | 19.4 | N/A |
| Turnout | | 2,147 | 39 | −11 |
| Liberal Democrats gain from UKIP | | Swing | +13.2 | |

Stubbington
| Party | Candidate | Votes | % | ±% |
|---|---|---|---|---|
| Liberal Democrats | Jim Forrest | 1,398 | 56.7 | +33.9 |
| Conservative | Pal Hayre | 906 | 36.7 | +7.0 |
| Labour | Lindsay Brown | 91 | 3.7 | −0.3 |
| UKIP | Andy Annear | 71 | 2.9 | −40.5 |
| Majority | | 492 | 20.0 | N/A |
| Turnout | | 2,466 | 45 | −5 |
| Liberal Democrats gain from UKIP | | Swing | +13.5 | |

=== Titchfield ===
Titchfield
| Party | Candidate | Votes | % | ±% |
|---|---|---|---|---|
| Conservative | Connie Hockley | 1,475 | 70.1 | +10.1 |
| Liberal Democrats | Jill Underwood | 324 | 15.4 | +6.0 |
| Labour | Michael Prior | 304 | 14.5 | +2.3 |
| Majority | | 1,151 | 54.7 | +13.2 |
| Turnout | | 2,103 | 36 | −2 |
| Conservative hold | | Swing | +2.1 | |

=== Titchfield Common ===
Titchfield Common
| Party | Candidate | Votes | % | ±% |
|---|---|---|---|---|
| Independent | Jack Englefield | 1,054 | 51.7 | +6.1 |
| Conservative | Karen Healey | 782 | 38.4 | +11.2 |
| Labour | Antony Ferraro | 201 | 9.9 | +4.3 |
| Majority | | 272 | 13.3 | −5.1 |
| Turnout | | 2,037 | 34 | −1 |
| Independent hold | | Swing | -2.6 | |

=== Warsash ===
Warsash
| Party | Candidate | Votes | % | ±% |
|---|---|---|---|---|
| Conservative | Trevor Cartwright | 1,634 | 73.8 | +7.9 |
| Liberal Democrats | Guy Benson | 456 | 20.6 | +16.5 |
| Labour | Nicola Moore | 125 | 5.6 | −1.6 |
| Majority | | 1,178 | 53.2 | +2.3 |
| Turnout | | 2,215 | 41 | +2 |
| Conservative hold | | Swing | -4.3 | |

| Preceded by 2016 Fareham Council election | Fareham local elections | Succeeded by 2021 Fareham Borough Council election |
