= 1999 Fareham Borough Council election =

1999 UK local government election

The 1999 Fareham Council election took place on 6 May 1999 to elect members of Fareham Borough Council in Hampshire, England. One third of the council was up for election and the Conservative party gained overall control of the council from no overall control.

After the election, the composition of the council was

- Conservative 21
- Liberal Democrat 14
- Labour 5
- Others 2

== Election result ==
The results saw the Conservatives take control of the council after winning 9 seats.

Fareham local election result 1999
Party	Seats	Gains	Losses	Net gain/loss	Seats %	Votes %	Votes	+/−
Conservative	9			+7	64.3	45.8	11,144	+3.7%
Liberal Democrats	4			-4	28.6	34.2	8,312	+1.6%
Labour	1			-2	7.1	20.0	4,874	+0.2%
Others	0			-1	0	0	0	-

== Ward results ==
Fareham East
Party	Candidate	Votes	%	±%
Liberal Democrats	Eleanor Murrary	657	44.3	−9.4
Conservative	David Kemp	560	37.8	+6.1
Labour	Timothy Brewer	266	17.9	+3.3
Majority		97	6.5	−15.5
Turnout		1,483	27.9	−1.4

Fareham North
Party	Candidate	Votes	%	±%
Conservative	Pamela Bryant	865	50.5	+9.1
Liberal Democrats	Geoffrey Burr	673	39.3	−4.4
Labour	Mary McFarlane	175	10.2	−4.6
Majority		192	11.2	
Turnout		1,713	35.9	+3.5

Fareham North-West
Party	Candidate	Votes	%	±%
Conservative	John Bryant	624	42.7	+7.6
Labour	Angela Carr	530	36.3	+1.9
Liberal Democrats	Adrian Iles	308	21.1	−9.4
Majority		94	6.4	+5.7
Turnout		1,462	25.9	+3.1

Fareham South
Party	Candidate	Votes	%	±%
Labour	George Neill	514	50.9	−5.1
Conservative	Dennis Steadman	315	31.2	+4.8
Liberal Democrats	Jennifer Chaloner	180	17.8	+0.2
Majority		199	19.7	−9.9
Turnout		1,009	21.2	−0.7

Fareham West
Party	Candidate	Votes	%	±%
Liberal Democrats	Hugh Pritchard	1,007	50.2	−3.0
Conservative	Charles Tierney	738	36.8	+2.9
Labour	Wilfred Phillips	262	13.1	+0.2
Majority		269	13.4	−6.0
Turnout		2,007	36.7	−0.1

Hill Head
Party	Candidate	Votes	%	±%
Conservative	Timothy Knight	1,207	48.7	+1.4
Liberal Democrats	Megan Chapman	1,076	43.4	+4.3
Labour	Anthony Randall	195	7.9	−5.7
Majority		131	5.3	−2.8
Turnout		2,478	40.2	+3.3

Locks Heath
Party	Candidate	Votes	%	±%
Conservative	Michael Godrich	1,360	48.0	+18.4
Liberal Democrats	David Savage	938	33.1	−4.8
Labour	Tracey Malizis	536	18.9	−4.4
Majority		422	14.9	
Turnout		2,834	25.8	−0.6

Portchester Central
Party	Candidate	Votes	%	±%
Liberal Democrats	Joan Eastman	768	52.7	−1.1
Labour	Leslie Ricketts	390	26.8	+0.8
Conservative	Susan Walker	299	20.5	+0.3
Majority		378	25.9	−2.0
Turnout		1,457	32.3	+1.1

Portchester East
Party	Candidate	Votes	%	±%
Conservative	Raymond Ellis	542	40.0	−1.4
Liberal Democrats	Peter Rudwick	465	34.3	+6.0
Labour	Brenda Pleasants	349	25.7	−4.6
Majority		77	5.7	−5.4
Turnout		1,356	33.9	+2.0

Portchester West
Party	Candidate	Votes	%	±%
Conservative	Marian Ellerton	791	47.7	−4.3
Liberal Democrats	Lionel Yeates	540	32.6	+5.3
Labour	Debra Cusack	327	19.7	−1.0
Majority		251	15.1	−9.6
Turnout		1,658	28.8	−0.3

Sarisbury
Party	Candidate	Votes	%	±%
Conservative	John Wilson	1,339	73.2	−0.9
Liberal Democrats	Elizabeth Williamson	246	13.4	+5.5
Labour	Nicholas Knight	245	13.4	+2.9
Majority		1,093	59.7	−3.9
Turnout		1,830	26.4	−9.7

Stubbington
Party	Candidate	Votes	%	±%
Liberal Democrats	Dorrine Burton-Jenkins	1,144	65.3	+13.2
Conservative	Christopher Terry	448	25.6	−10.0
Labour	Michael Taylor	159	9.1	−3.2
Majority		696	39.7	+23.2
Turnout		1,751	33.5	−4.0

Titchfield
Party	Candidate	Votes	%	±%
Conservative	Francis Devonshire	830	58.0	+13.2
Liberal Democrats	Janet Hughes	310	21.6	+21.6
Labour	Francis Allison	292	20.4	+1.0
Majority		520	36.3	+27.2
Turnout		1,432	25.4	−2.9

Warsash
Party	Candidate	Votes	%	±%
Conservative	Linda Bounds	1,226	65.9	+7.5
Labour	Graham Holden	634	34.1	+19.3
Majority		592	31.8	−9.3
Turnout		1,860	27.7	−2.1
