= Fothergill (surname) =

Fothergill is a surname, thought to have come from the meaning 'Further river' and may refer to the following:

- Alastair Fothergill, English TV producer
- Allodin Fothergill (born 1987), Jamaican athlete
- Andrew Fothergill, English cricketer
- Anthony Fothergill (physician) (1732–1813), English physician
- Anthony Fothergill (theologian) (1686–1761), English theological writer
- Arnold Fothergill (1854–1932), English cricketer
- Bob Fothergill (1897–1938), American baseball player
- Charles Fothergill (1782–1840), Canadian journalist and politician
- Des Fothergill, Australian rules footballer
- George Algernon Fothergill (1868–1945), Scottish illustrator and painter
- Jessie Fothergill (1851–1891), English novelist
- John Fothergill (engineer) (born 1953), Pro-Vice-Chancellor of City University London
- John Fothergill (innkeeper) (1876–1957), English innkeeper and entrepreneur
- John Fothergill (merchant) (1730–1782), merchant from Birmingham, England
- John Fothergill (physician) FRS (1712–1780), English physician, plant collector, philanthropist and Quaker
- John Fothergill (priest) (1808–1851), the inaugural Archdeacon of Berbice
- John Milner Fothergill, M.D. (1841–1888), British physician and medical writer
- Jon Fothergill, American politician
- Marmaduke Fothergill (1652–1731), scholar and collector
- Miles Fothergill, British actor
- Pat Fothergill, Scottish roboticist
- Peita-Claire Fothergill, Australian soccer player
- Philip Fothergill, English businessman and politician
- Philip G. Fothergill FRSE FIAL (1908–1967), British biologist and historian of science
- Richard Fothergill (ironmaster) (1758–1821), ironmaster in South Wales
- Richard Fothergill (politician) (1822–1903), British politician and businessman
- Samuel Fothergill (1715–1772), Quaker minister
- Tessa Fothergill, founder of the British single-parent charity Gingerbread
- Thomas Fothergill, English academic administrator at the University of Oxford
- Thomas Fothergill (ironmaster) (1791–1858), ironmaster, sheriff of Monmouthshire
- Watson Fothergill, English architect
- William Edward Fothergill (1865–1926), professor of clinical obstetrics and gynaecology at the University of Manchester

== See also ==
- Fothergill (disambiguation)
- Fothergilla
- Henry Fothergill Chorley (1808–1872), English music critic
- William Fothergill Cooke (1806–1879), English inventor
- John Fothergill Crosfield (1915–2012), inventor and entrepreneur
- Abraham Cecil Francis Fothergill Rowlands (1856–1914) aka Cecil Raleigh, English actor and playwright
- Mr Fothergill's, a British seed merchant based in Kentford in Suffolk, England
