= John Fothergill =

John Fothergill may refer to:

- John Fothergill (physician) (1712–1780), English physician and botanist
- John Fothergill (merchant) (1730–1782), English merchant
- John Fothergill (engineer) (born 1953), English engineer
- John Milner Fothergill (1841–1888), medical writer
- John Fothergill (innkeeper) (1876–1957), gentleman innkeeper
- John Fothergill (priest) (1808–1851), Archdeacon of Berbice

== See also ==
- Jon Fothergill, American politician
