= Crofton School =

Location
- Marks Road; Stubbington, Hampshire, PO14 2AT; England; 50.823°N 1.205°W

Information
- Type: Academy
- Motto: Kindness, Ambition & Diligence.
- Established: 1974
- Local authority: Hampshire
- Trust: HISP Multi Academy Trust
- Department for Education URN: 149621 Tables
- Ofsted: Reports
- Headteacher: Mark Palmer
- Gender: Coeducational
- Age: 11 to 16
- Enrolment: 1103
- Capacity: 1083
- Houses: Fire , Water , Earth , Wind
- Years: 7-11
- Website: www.croftonschool.co.uk

Crofton School is a coeducational secondary school, located in Stubbington, Hampshire, England. The school has around 1,100 students aged between 11 and 16 (years 7 to 11). The school accepts pupils from the areas of: Stubbington, Hill Head, Titchfield, Peel Common, Gosport and Locks Heath.

Crofton opened in 1974 as a purpose-built mixed comprehensive school. The headteacher is Simon Harrison, who was appointed in January 2017. Crofton was awarded Specialist Science Status in 2005 but this has since been revoked.

Crofton has two 'feeder' schools: Crofton Hammond Junior School and Crofton Anne Dale Junior School. Attendance at one of these feeder schools is a factor in admission to Crofton School.

Previously a foundation school administered by Hampshire County Council, in April 2023 Crofton School converted to academy status. The school is now sponsored by the HISP Multi Academy Trust.

== Ofsted inspections ==
The school was previously judged Good by Ofsted, confirmed at a short inspection in 2018 which upheld the judgement from a full inspection in 2014.

A full inspection took place on 3 March 2026 under Ofsted's renewed inspection framework, which replaced the previous four-point scale with five descriptors: Exceptional, Strong Standard, Expected Standard, Needs Attention, and Urgent Improvement. The inspection returned the following judgements:

Area	Judgement
Achievement	Needs Attention
Curriculum and Teaching	Needs Attention
Inclusion	Needs Attention
Leadership and Governance	Needs Attention
Attendance and Behaviour	Expected Standard
Personal Development and Wellbeing	Expected Standard
Safeguarding	Met
