= Laurie Brokenshire =

Royal Naval officer (1952–2017)

Commodore Laurie Brokenshire CBE
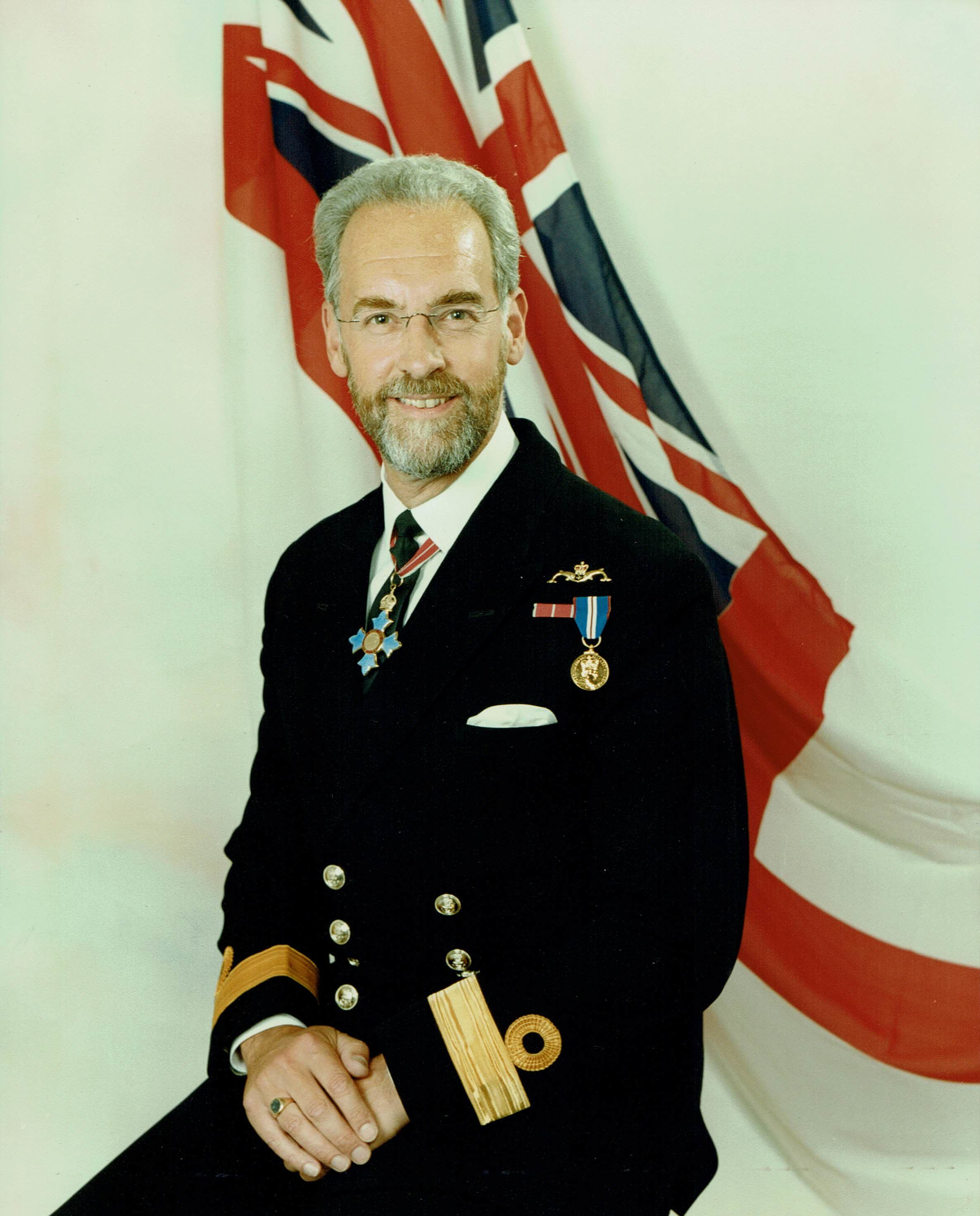

Commodore

Personal details
- Born: 20 October 1952 Plymouth, Devon, England
- Died: 4 August 2017 (aged 64) Stubbington, Hampshire, England
- Resting place: Crofton Cemetery, Hampshire, England
- Citizenship: British
- Spouse: Ethel Isobel McMahon
- Children: Sarah Isobel Brokenshire; Matthew William Brokenshire; Rachel Ellen Brokenshire; Phillip Laurence Brokenshire
- Education: University of Exeter

Military service
- Allegiance: United Kingdom
- Branch/service: Royal Navy
- Rank: Commodore

Commodore Laurence Phillip Brokenshire CBE (20 October 1952 – 4 August 2017) was a Royal Naval officer, magician, and world-class puzzle solver. He is also known to have successfully fostered over 70 children in 22 years.

== History ==
Laurie Brokenshire was born on 20 October 1952 at 40 Amherst Road, Plymouth to Martin Brokenshire (1926–97) and his wife Pansy Jeanne (née Hewitt; 1930-2007). He had a younger sister, Lynnette, and a younger brother, Adrian. His early hobby interests included chess, puzzles and magic. In 1964, he joined Devonport High School for Boys.

In 1966, following the completion of his father's naval career, the family moved to Slough, where he joined Slough Grammar School, now called Upton Court Grammar School. He played for Buckinghamshire junior hockey. In later years, he managed the School chess club and, jointly, the School bridge club (which notably beat Eton College on one occasion).

After school, he went to the University of Exeter (1971–75) where he took a BSc (Hons) degree in Mathematics, graduating in 1974, and a PGCE (Maths) in 1975. He played hockey and table tennis for University teams, and turned down the offer of a place in the University bridge team. During this time, he beat his Head of Department, Professor David Rees, at both chess and, at Rees' insistence, Go.

=== Royal Navy ===
In 1975, Brokenshire joined the Royal Navy as an Instructor - his father's career and service branch. He spent some time as Maths Instructor at HMS Fisgard, an Artificer apprentice training establishment, Torpoint, E. Cornwall. After training at Royal Naval College, Greenwich, and subsequent postings to Dartmouth, Westminster, Plymouth, Portsmouth and Faslane, his career developed as a submariner and later as a senior Royal Navy officer. His success on the Greenwich course encouraged him to take a second degree, this time an Open University BA degree in Science. As 2007 Royal Navy chess champion and President of the Combined Services Chess Association, he represented the RN at the NATO Chess championship several years running, creating for himself an international standing in military chess.

In later years, he commanded two shore establishments: firstly Northwood (1992–93) and later, as a Commodore, HMS Raleigh (2000–03) - the Navy's main Torpoint training centre - the family lived at nearby Trevol House. In 2003, on the occasion of his retirement, the family moved back to their house in Stubbington, Hampshire, and he was awarded a CBE for services rendered.

=== Sea Cadets ===
Following the end of his Royal Navy career, Brokenshire was appointed as Commodore of the UK Sea Cadet Corps. As such, he toured and inspected as many local associations as he could. On one such visit to Essex, he met his 6th cousin and fellow Exeter-graduate, the local MP James Brokenshire (1968–2021), and remained in regular contact.

== Magic ==
Brokenshire was accepted into the Inner Magic Circle, and became an occasional professional / semi-professional magic performer. He was regularly used by his charities as a high-profile magic performer, in particular, performing table magic for members of the British Royal Family at various charitable occasions. He was always able to find a suitable magic trick for any occasion, particularly for young children, and carried his "magic" bag with him at all times.

== Puzzling ==
In his spare time, Brokenshire became a world-class puzzling expert. Specialising in combinatorial and mechanical puzzles, he was in regular contact with puzzle researchers, designers, makers, enthusiasts and other specialists around the world. He introduced some novel solutions to existing problems, and was exceptionally quick to solve new problems. He was retained by a number of major puzzles companies as a consultant to offer an assessment on the viability of proposed puzzles. His personal puzzle collection was considered among the largest in the UK. He organised and held G4G Celebration of Mind meetings at his house.

Historically, the famous puzzlist Henry Dudeney (1857–1930) announced a particularly-difficult chessboard (aka checkerboard) dissection puzzle in one of his first puzzle books and asserted that it had a "unique", or single, solution. Numerous people tried and failed to solve this puzzle, such that it became famously known as the "Dudeney Problem". Some years later, true to his word, Dudeney gave his "unique" solution in one of his last puzzle books. Later still, Dudeney's former collaborator, Sam Loyd (1841–1911), asserted his own abilities, and disproved Dudeney's assertion of uniqueness, by giving a second "unique" solution in one of his puzzle books. This same problem then became known as the "Dudeney-Loyd problem". Today, that same problem is classified as the "Dudeney-Loyd-Brokenshire problem" when Brokenshire found the third "unique" solution, after a gap of about 100 years. Substantial further analysis has shown that there were only ever three solutions, despite Dudeney's original claim. For this solution and others, Laurie Brokenshire is present in the puzzling record books, and is in illustrious company.

=== International Puzzle Parties ===
Brokenshire and his wife, Ethel, camped and bicycled the length of several continents to reach successive invitation-only annual International Puzzle Parties (IPP). Taking two bicycles, two panniers and a magic bag, they cycled and either wild-camped or stayed with friends along the Eastern coast of Australia, around the North Island of New Zealand, Japan, Europe and Scandinavia, and various routes across the US from Alaska to Washington, D.C. On one trip, Ethel automatically swatted a bear, which was nuzzling the side of their tent in the early hours of the morning, without suffering any ill effects. On another, he contracted viral encephalitis from an infected tick bite.

He organised and hosted the 2014 IPP34 puzzle party, based at a hotel near Heathrow.

== Fostering ==
From 1994, Brokenshire and his wife, Ethel, undertook fostering in Hampshire. They successfully fostered over 70 children in 22 years.

== Religion ==
Brokenshire was a member of the Navy Christian Fellowship and was a pillar of his local Church.

== Sea swimming ==
In 1986, Brokenshire swam the English Channel. Subsequently, his son Matthew has also swum the Channel - making them one of the few father and son pairs who have achieved this feat. In later years, Brokenshire enjoyed sea swimming throughout the year with his local "Shack Sharks" club, and represented his locality at cold water swimming competitions up and down the country.

== Personal life ==
Brokenshire married Ethel Isobel McMahon (born 1954) (WRNS) on 29 March 1980 at Clonallan Parish Church, with four children and several grandchildren.

He was a member of Mensa.

=== Illness, death and legacy ===
In early 2016, Brokenshire was diagnosed with terminal brain cancer, which had overtaken his father some 20 years earlier. His response was immediate and typically selfless - his family undertook a 30-mile crowd-sponsored sea swim off Plymouth in aid of various cancer charities, raising the targeted £30,000 in under three weeks, and in excess of £45,000 overall.

He had a protracted 18-month fight against his cancer, enabling him to see and interact with his new grandchildren. On 4 August 2017, he died at home surrounded by all his family. On 18 August, following a Thanksgiving service, attended by around 1000 people, at Crofton Church, his body was interred at nearby Crofton Cemetery.
