= River Meon =

River in Hampshire, England

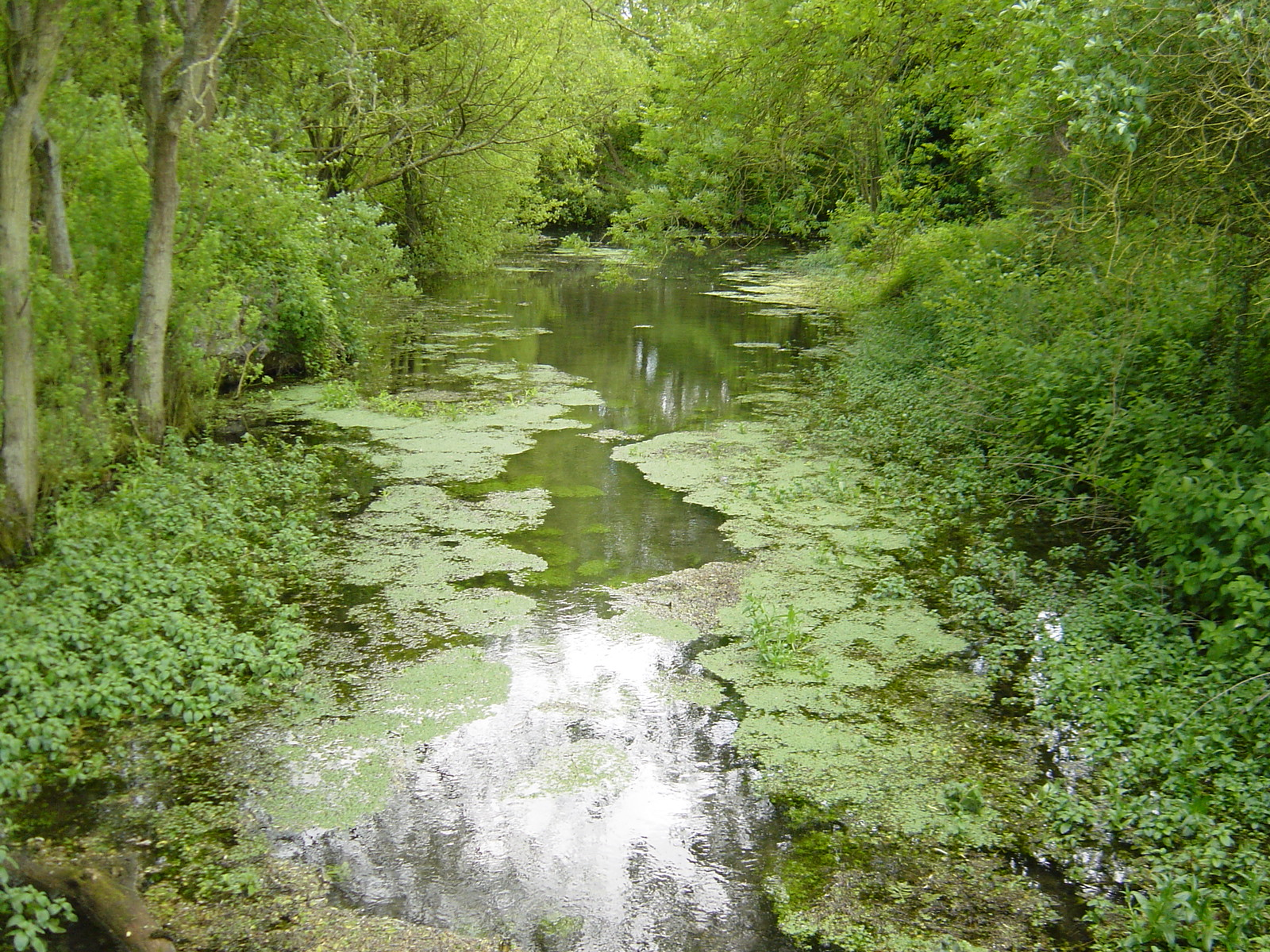
- River Meon Spring

Location
- Country: England
- County: Hampshire

Physical characteristics
- Source: Meon Spring
  - location: East Meon, Hampshire, England
  - coordinates: 50.9785°N 1.0249°W
  - elevation: 120 metres (390 ft)
- Mouth: Hill Head Harbour
  - location: The Solent, Hampshire, England
  - coordinates: 50.8183°N 1.2430°W
  - elevation: 0 metres (0 ft)
- Length: 34 km (21 mi)
- Discharge
  - location: Mislingford
  - average: 0.98 m^{3}/s (35 cu ft/s)
  - minimum: 0.06 m^{3}/s (2.1 cu ft/s)5 August 1976
  - maximum: 11.0 m^{3}/s (390 cu ft/s)1 January 2003

The River Meon (/ˈmiːɒn/) is a chalk stream in Hampshire in the south of England. It rises at East Meon then flows 34 km (21 mi) in a generally southerly direction to empty into the Solent at Hill Head near Stubbington. Above Wickham, the river runs through the South Downs National Park.

== Course ==
The River Meon rises one mile (1.6 km) south of the village centre of East Meon. It flows due north, then northwest to West Meon, and southwest to Warnford followed by its characteristic, quite straight, south-southwest course, with many tiny wobbles in short stretches. The river descends through the villages of Exton, Corhampton and Meonstoke, Droxford, Wickham, and Titchfield. The river outflows over 2 miles (3.2 km) of estuary through the marshes of the Titchfield Haven National Nature Reserve to enter the Solent through a small harbour at Hill Head. Overall the valley forms the shape of that of a shepherd's crook.

== Navigation ==
Above the estuary has never been navigable. Titchfield Haven, on the Solent coast was a minor harbour. In the 17th century, the Earl of Southampton caused a sluice (not a canal) to be built (Titchfield Canal) to drain the marshes. The reinstated wetlands form the Titchfield Haven National Nature Reserve.

== Water quality ==
The Environment Agency measures the water quality of the river systems in England. Each is given an overall ecological status, which may be one of five levels: high, good, moderate, poor and bad. There are several components that are used to determine this, including biological status, which looks at the quantity and varieties of invertebrates, angiosperms and fish. Chemical status, which compares the concentrations of various chemicals against known safe concentrations, is rated good or fail.

Water quality of the River Meon in 2019:

Section	Ecological Status	Chemical Status	Overall Status	Length	Catchment	Channel
Meon	Good	Fail	Moderate	46.245 km (28.735 mi)	108.059 km^{2} (41.722 sq mi)	

== Gallery ==
The River Meon, from the South Downs to the Solent

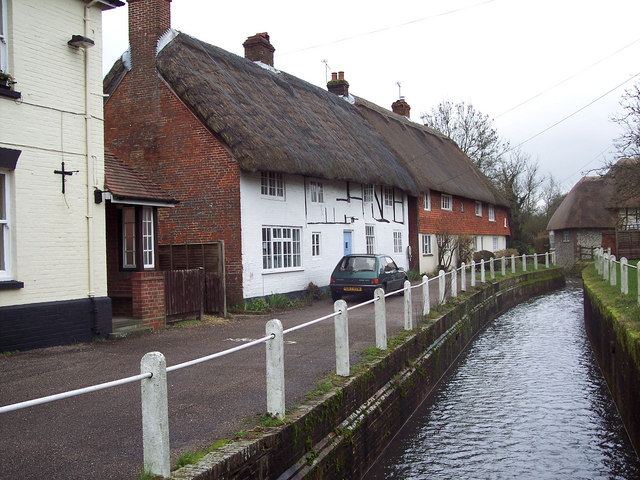
1. East Meon

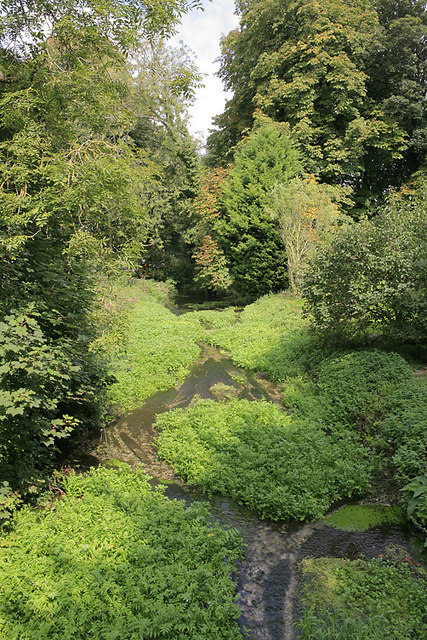
2. The Meon at Warnford

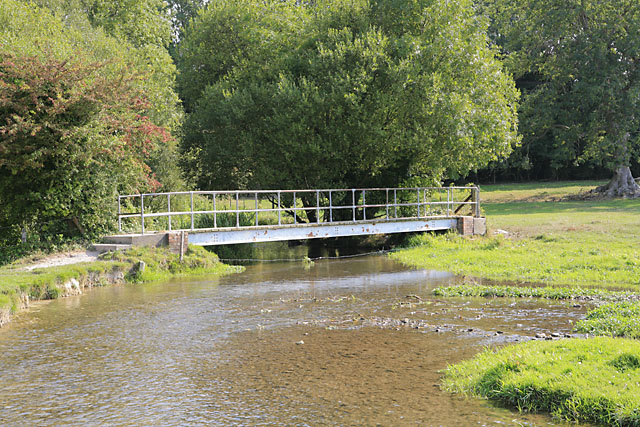
3. Bridge over River Meon at Soberton

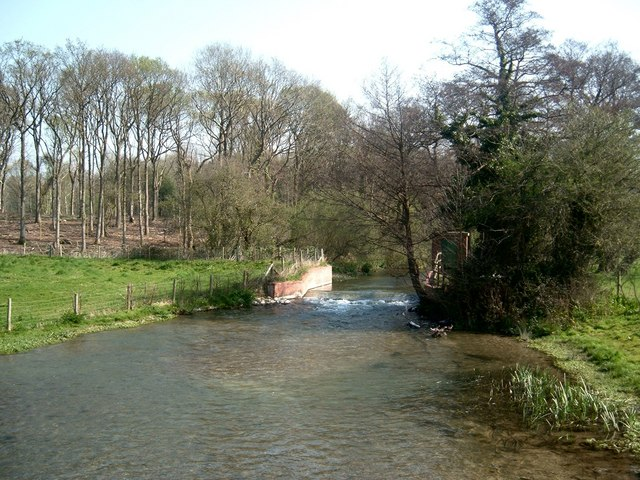
4. Mislingford

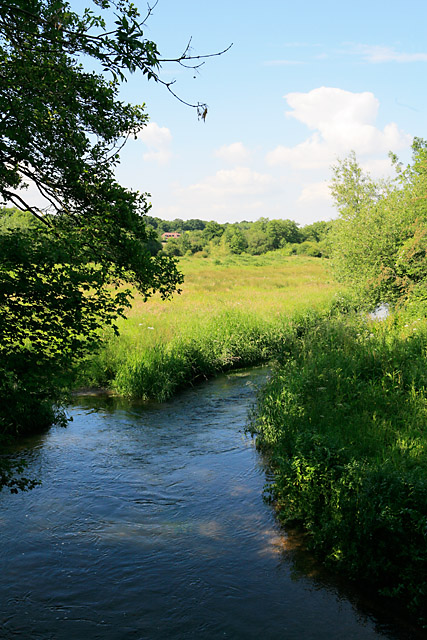
5. Fareham, north of the M27 motorway

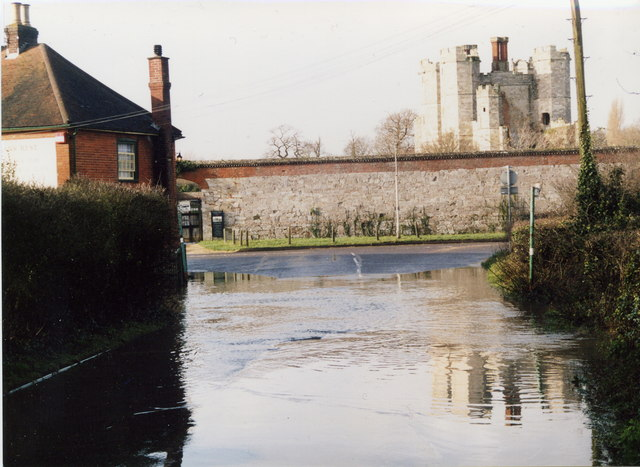
6. Flooding in Catisfield

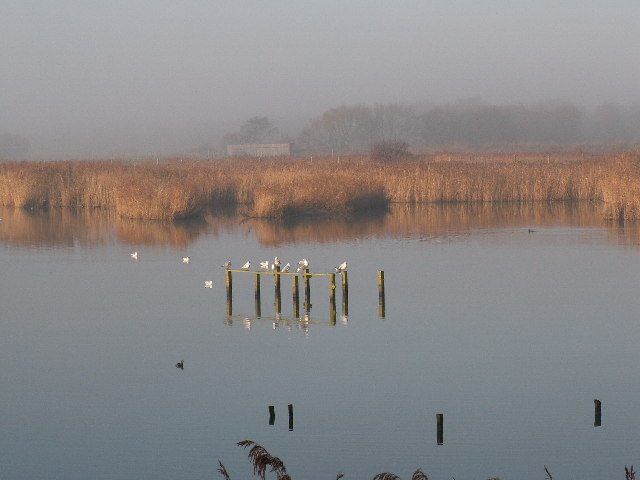
7. Titchfield Haven

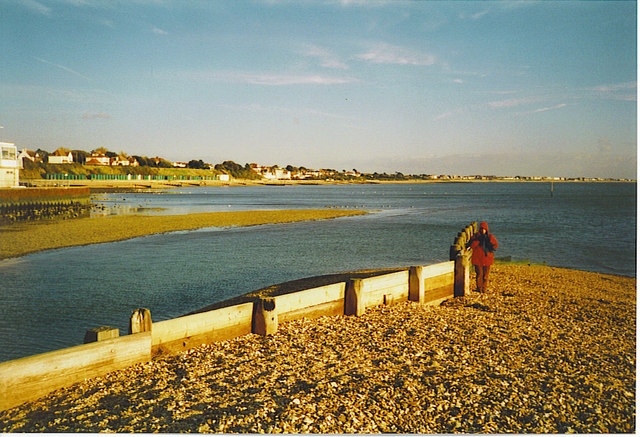
8. River Meon at the Solent

== See also ==
- Meonwara - The people who lived in the Meon Valley during the Anglo-Saxon period.
