= Fothergill =

Fothergill may refer to:

- Fothergill, Cumbria, a place in England
- Fothergill (surname), people with the surname Fothergill

== See also ==
- Fothergill gold medal, awarded triennially by the Medical Society of London.
- Fothergill medal, previously awarded by the Royal Humane Society.
- Fothergill–Round–Mitchell Medal, a Victoria Football League award that is presented to the most promising young talent.
- Fothergill's sign, a medical sign
- Fothergill island, an island in Lake Kariba
- Milner-Fothergill gold medal, awarded by the University of Edinburgh for contribution to therapeutics.
- Fothergilla, a plant genus
