= John Frederick Pickering =

British economic and business consultant (1939–2018)

- Born: 26 December 1939
- Died: 25 June 2018 (aged 78); Hampshire, England

Academic background
- Education: University College London

Academic work
- Institutions: University of Manchester Institute of Science and Technology (UMIST), University of Portsmouth

John Frederick Pickering, FRSA (26 December 1939 – 25 June 2018) was a British economic and business consultant. He held senior posts at several UK universities and served on the Monopolies and Mergers Commission (MMC) and Competition Commission Appeal Tribunal. He was a member of the General Synod of the Church of England as well as a church commissioner and president of the Bible Churchmen's Missionary Society (BCMS)-Crosslinks.

== Education and career ==
Pickering was educated at Slough Grammar School for Boys (now Upton Court Grammar School). He later studied at University College London (UCL) where he obtained his BSc, PhD, and DSc.

Pickering began his professional career as an industrial market research executive (1961–62) before being appointed as a lecturer at Durham University (1964–66) and University of Sussex (1966–73). After a brief period at the Administrative Staff College, Henley (now Henley Business School) he joined University of Manchester Institute of Science and Technology (UMIST) as professor of industrial economics (1975–88), later serving as both vice-principal (1983–85) and dean (1985–87).

Between 1988 and 1990, Pickering served as vice-president of the University of Portsmouth (formerly Portsmouth Polytechnic); he was also the institution's acting president (1990–1), deputy president (1991–92), and deputy vice-chancellor (1992–94). He was dismissed in 1994, shortly after acting as a whistleblower.

Pickering was subsequently professor of Business Strategy at the University of Bath School of Management (1997–2000) and a visiting professor at both Durham University Business School (1995–98) and the University of Southampton's School of Management (2001–04).

Pickering served as a member of the Retail Price Index Advisory Committee (1974–95), the Monopolies and Mergers Commission (MMC) (1990–99), the Competition Commission Appeal Tribunal (2000–03), Competition Appeal Tribunal (2003–11), and the Strategic Advisory Board for Intellectual Property Policy (2008–10).

He died on 25 June 2018 at the age of 78.

== Whistleblowing ==
In 1994, the secretary of the University of Portsmouth's then vice-chancellor Neil Merritt, had concerns relating to her boss's travel expenses. Pickering investigated and, sharing her concerns, passed them on to the governor's audit committee. Merritt resigned, admitting errors of judgement; he had been claiming expenses for executive class flight tickets for long haul air travel but then trading the tickets in for cheaper ones and making a personal profit. On his departure, Merritt received a £52,500 severance package; no prosecution was sought by the university.

Soon afterwards, both Pickering and Merritt's secretary were dismissed by the university. The secretary subsequently brought a claim for constructive dismissal against the university; an industrial tribunal found in her favour and she was awarded compensation of £10,000. However, Pickering's career stalled. An unpublished report by Jeremy Lever QC into the events at Portsmouth concluded that "there was a causal link between the investigation into the vice-chancellor's expenses and Professor Pickering's departure from the university". However, ignoring both the Lever Report and the findings of the secretary's industrial tribunal, the National Audit Office (NAO) published a report in May 1997 that concluded that there was "no evidence" that Professor Pickering was "penalised or persecuted in any way" as a result of his actions as a whistleblower. The NAO report found that the vice-chancellor's secretary was also not victimised for whistleblowing.

At the time of the publication of the NAO report, Pickering had been fighting for redress from the University of Portsmouth for four years; he sought to have the report withdrawn, arguing that it stood in the way of his chances of reaching a settlement with the university over his dismissal. However, Sir John Bourn, Comptroller and Auditor General of the NAO, wrote to Pickering saying: "I regret that you feel that you have been unfairly and unsympathetically treated by the NAO. It is of course for you to decide if you wish to take any further action on this matter. I think it unlikely that we can help you further". Pickering's campaign to have the NAO report withdrawn was later backed by Portsmouth MPs Mike Hancock and Michael Mates. Sir John Bourn acknowledged in a letter to the latter:

The report is critical of the way the governing body handled a number of issues, including Professor Pickering's departure from the university [... and...] contains some criticisms of the treatment of whistleblowers. In relation to Professor Pickering, the report does record that the investigation (into the vice-chancellor's expenses) was not an insignificant factor in the chain of events leading up to Professor Pickering's departure".

Pickering's challenge to the NAO report was unsuccessful. The university's new vice-chancellor, Professor John Craven, and its chair of Governors, Caroline Williams, refused to hold an internal inquiry into the whistleblowing affair, the latter saying: "As far as the university is concerned, the NAO has sufficiently dealt with the matter and there is nothing further for the university to do". Professor Craven said: "The university regards the NAO report as an authoritative, independent and definitive conclusion of the unhappy events which led to the resignation of Mr Merritt".

Following repeated unsuccessful attempts to resume his career, Pickering suspected that he had been "blacklisted" for his whistleblowing at Portsmouth. In 2000, an inquiry by Elaine Storkey investigated his concerns that letters from a recruitment consultancy specialising in high-level educational appointments, Saxton Bampfylde Hever, "did not contain the truth". She found Pickering's concerns to be justified, concluding that: "The reasons he had been variously given as to why his applications were not put before the selection committees were not accurate", adding that Professor Pickering "would have made a very significant contribution" to higher education. Dr Storkey also said that the correspondence with Professor Pickering was "late, brief and somewhat dismissive". Storkey's inquiry nevertheless found that "Saxton Bampfylde had indeed promoted his candidacy as fairly as that of any other". The company admitted no liability but apologised to Pickering, through his lawyers, for not being as open as it could have been and for being "dilatory, dismissive and inaccurate" in its dealings with him.

In 2014, Hampshire Constabulary reviewed the material relating to former University of Portsmouth vice-chancellor Neil Merritt's expenses; the force's chief constable, Andy Marsh, subsequently wrote a letter to Pickering in which he stated that it was "evident from this material that offences of fraud were committed" and that other allegations should also have been further investigated. He added: "I am sorry that the actions of Hampshire Constabulary seem not to have reached the standard expected of them".

== Other Positions ==
Pickering served as a member of the General Synod of the Church of England (1980–90) and as a church commissioner (1983–90). He was president of Bible Churchmen's Missionary Society (BCMS)-Crosslinks between 1986 and 1992. From 2004 to 2006, Pickering was trustee and chairman of the Vocational Training Charitable Trust. He has been director and non-executive director of a number of companies, including Staniland Hall Ltd (1987–94).

== Publications ==
- J.F. Pickering (1966). Resale price maintenance in practice. Allen & Unwin. ISBN 978-0043360088.
- J.F. Pickering; Isherwood, BC (1973). Purchase probabilities and consumer durable buying behaviour. The University.
- J.F. Pickering (1974). Industrial structure and market conduct. Martin Robertson & Co. ISBN 978-0855200398.
- J.F. Pickering (1977). The acquisition of consumer durables: A cross-sectional investigation. John Wiley & Sons. ISBN 978-0470990308.
- Pickering, J.F.; Cockerill, T.A.J., eds. (1984). Economic Management of the Firm. Philip Allan Publishers Ltd. ISBN 978-0860031604.
