= Crofton, Hampshire =

Village in Hampshire, England

Coordinates: 50.8232°N 1.1961°W

Crofton
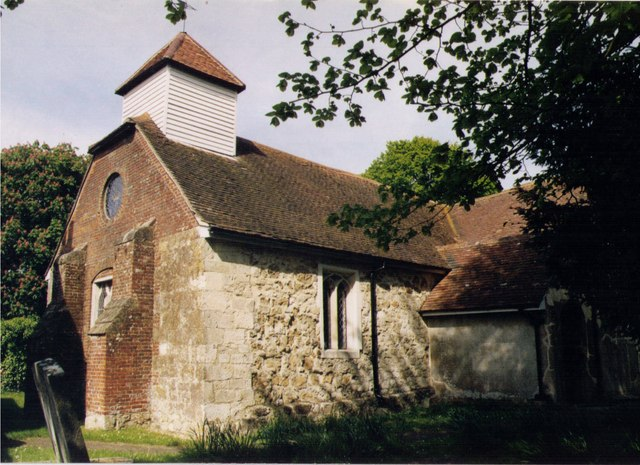
- St Edmund's Church

- Location within Hampshire
- Population: 37
- District: Fareham
- Shire county: Hampshire
- Region: South East
- Country: England
- Sovereign state: United Kingdom
- Post town: FAREHAM
- Postcode district: PO14
- Dialling code: 01329
- Police: Hampshire and Isle of Wight
- Fire: Hampshire and Isle of Wight
- Ambulance: South Central
- UK Parliament: Gosport

Crofton was a village in the area of Stubbington, in the Fareham district, in the county of Hampshire, England. It is where many local facilities derive their name, such as Crofton Secondary School. The community centre, once Stubbington House School that educated Polar explorer Robert Falcon Scott, is also named after Crofton.

== History ==
Crofton was recorded in the Domesday Book as Croftone. Crofton was formerly a chapelry in the parish of Titchfield, on 30 September 1894 Crofton became a separate civil parish, on 1 April 1932 the parish was abolished and merged with Fareham. In 1931 the parish had a population of 2030.
