= Anthony Fothergill =

Anthony Fothergill may refer to:

- Anthony Fothergill (theologian) (1685–1761), English theological writer
- Anthony Fothergill (physician) (1732–1813), English physician
