= EOST =

EOST may refer to:

- Ecole et Observatoire des Sciences de la Terre, a French school and Observatory
- Earl of Southampton Trust, a housing charity in England
