= Albert Atkinson (disambiguation) =

Albert Atkinson (1909–1953) was an English rugby player.

Albert Atkinson may also refer to:

- A. K. Salim (Albert Atkinson, 1922–2003), American alto-saxophonist and arranger
- Albert Atkinson (baseball) (1861–1952), American baseball player
- Bert Atkinson, EastEnders character
