= Upton Grammar =

Upton Grammar may refer to:

- Upton Court Grammar School in Slough, Berkshire, England
- Upton Hall School FCJ, a girls' Roman Catholic grammar school with academy status located in Merseyside, England
