= Peter Viggers =

British politician (1938–2020)

Sir Peter Viggers
- Official portrait, 2005

Member of Parliament for Gosport
- In office 28 February 1974 – 12 April 2010
- Preceded by: Constituency created
- Succeeded by: Caroline Dinenage

Personal details
- Born: Peter John Viggers; 13 March 1938 Gosport, Hampshire, England
- Died: 19 March 2020 (aged 82)
- Party: Conservative
- Education: The Portsmouth Grammar School
- Alma mater: Trinity Hall, Cambridge; College of Law
- Profession: Solicitor; politician
- Awards: Knight Bachelor (2008)
- Website: Official website

Military service
- Branch/service: Royal Air Force; British Army
- Years of service: 1957–1969

Sir Peter John Viggers (13 March 1938 – 19 March 2020) was a British Conservative politician and lawyer who served as Member of Parliament (MP) for Gosport for 36 years, from 1974 to 2010. He stepped down as a result of the investigation of MPs' expenses.

== Early life ==
Born in Gosport, Hampshire, he was the son of John Sidney Viggers. He was educated at Alverstoke School and Portsmouth Grammar School, a public school in Portsmouth. He studied at Trinity Hall, University of Cambridge, receiving an MA in History and Law in 1961. He qualified from the College of Law in Guildford in 1967. He became a solicitor in 1967.

== Career ==
=== Military service ===
As part of National Service, Viggers was commissioned into the Royal Air Force on 8 January 1957 as an acting pilot officer. He was regraded to pilot officer on 8 January 1958, and promoted to flying officer on 18 May 1958. On 20 April 1958, he was transferred to the Reserve (national service list), ending his active service. He relinquished his commission in the Royal Air Force on 20 July 1963.

He then joined the Royal Artillery, Territorial Army, on 20 July 1963 as a lieutenant. He was given seniority in that rank from 20 July 1960. He was made acting captain on 13 January 1965 before being promoted to that rank on 13 March 1965. On 1 April 1967, he transferred to the Wessex Brigade, Territorial Army. At his request, he also reverted to the rank of lieutenant and was given seniority in that rank from 18 September 1960. He resigned from his commission on 31 March 1969, ending his military career.

=== Politics ===
Viggers was Member of Parliament for Gosport and lived just a few miles from where he was born. He was first elected in February 1974 and served as industry minister for Northern Ireland under Margaret Thatcher from 1986 to 1989. He left the ministry in 1989 and returned to the backbenches.

In 2002, he made headlines by suggesting that the European Union adopt a "single European language" to cut down on translation costs.

=== Duck island scandal ===
On 21 May 2009, The Daily Telegraph reported on Viggers' claims as part of its investigation of MPs' expenses, which it said showed Viggers was paid more than £30,000 for gardening expenses over three years. The paper noted in particular that Viggers had attempted to claim for a "pond feature" worth £1,645, which was identified as a "floating duck island". However, it was unclear whether he had been reimbursed as an official had written "not allowable" next to it. On hearing the details of the story the Telegraph intended to run, Viggers announced late the previous night "at the direct request" of party leader David Cameron his intention to stand down at the next election. He also stood down from his role as spokesman for the Speaker's Committee answering Parliamentary Questions for the Electoral Commission. On his website, however, he said about expenses: "Personally, I have of course always scrupulously observed the rules".

The floating duck house, a symbol of the expenses scandal, was later sold at auction. It raised £1,700, handed over to the Macmillan Cancer charity. The claim was later referenced in the name of the 2013 farcical political satire The Duck House based on the parliamentary expenses scandal.

== Honours ==
Viggers was appointed a Knight Bachelor in the 2008 Queen's Birthday Honours 'for services to Parliament'. He was knighted in a ceremony at Buckingham Palace on 14 October 2008 by Queen Elizabeth II.

=== Business interests ===
From 1970 to 1979, Viggers was chairman and director of banking, oil, hotels, textiles, pharmaceuticals, and venture capital companies. He was the chairman of Calgary-based Tracer Petroleum Corporation from 1996 to 1998, and of Lloyd's Pension Fund from 1996. He was a director of Jakarta-based Emerald Energy plc from April 1998 to 2003.

== Personal life ==
Viggers was a vice-patron of the Royal National Lifeboat Institution. He was also an honorary treasurer of the America All Party Parliamentary Group. He was chairman of governors at St Vincent College for four years.

In 1993, Viggers nearly drowned after being thrown into the English Channel, without a life jacket, in a yacht race in gale force winds. He credited his survival to "closing my eyes and thinking of John Major".

He died on 19 March 2020 at the age of 82.

Parliament of the United Kingdom
New constituency	Member of Parliament for Gosport; 1974–2010	Succeeded by Caroline Dinenage
