= Hill Head =

Village in Hampshire, England

Coordinates: 50°49′N 1°14′W

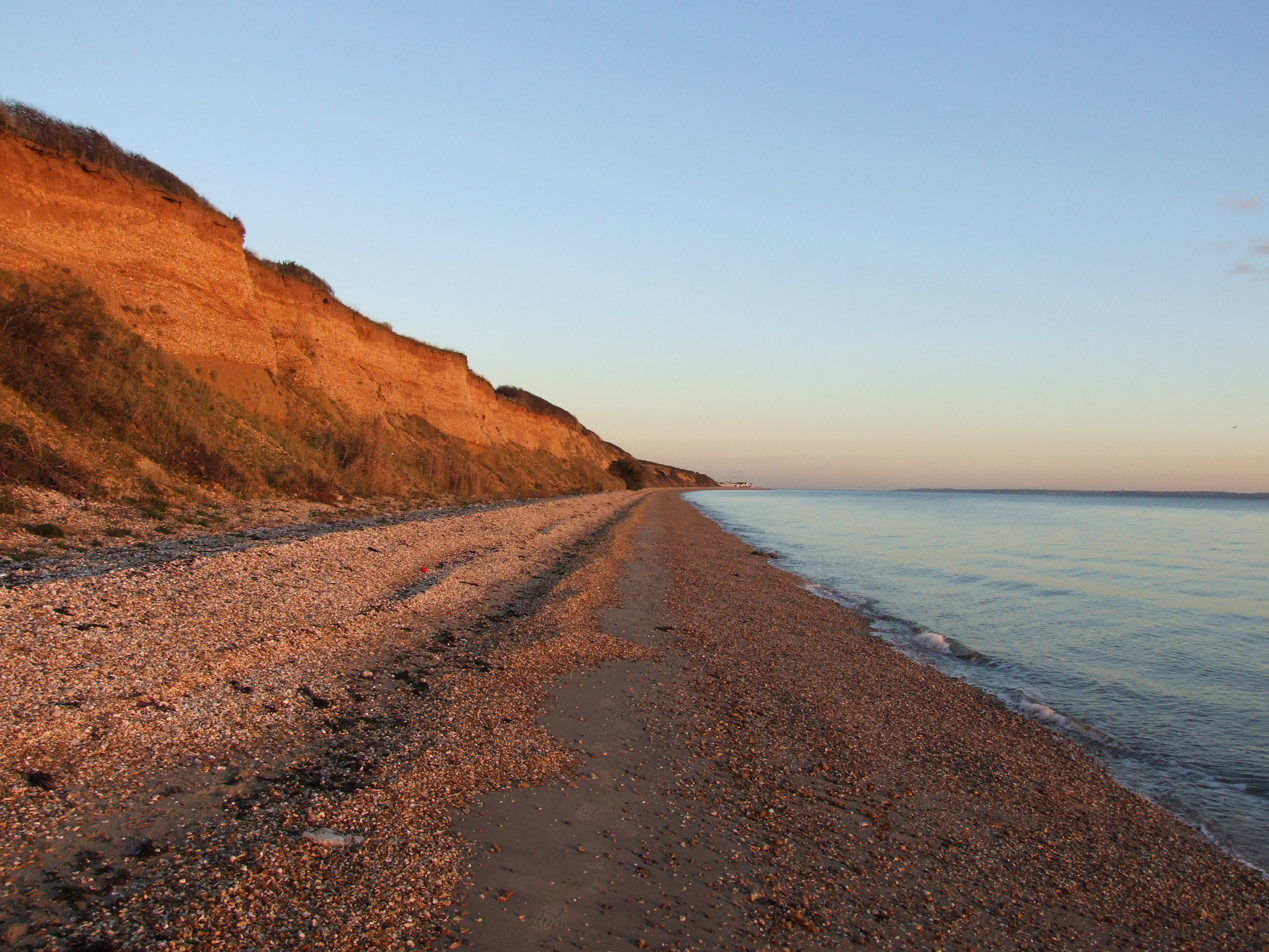
Hill Head beach

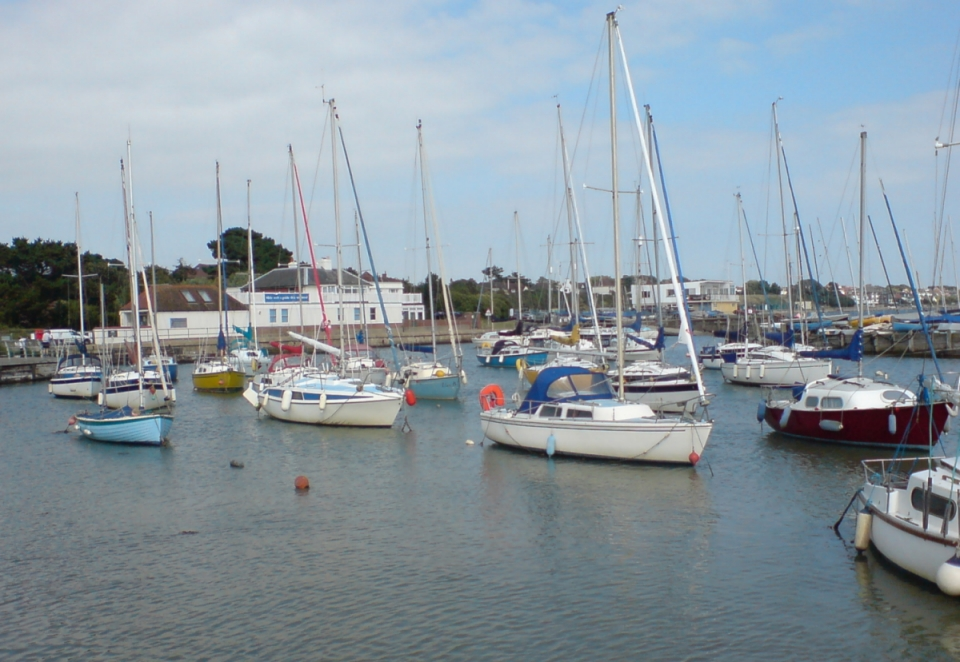
Hill Head harbour

Hill Head is a residential area and village on the coast of the Solent. It is located south of Stubbington, west of Lee-on-the-Solent and south east of Titchfield, in the borough of Fareham, Hampshire.

== Governance ==
Hill Head is in the Gosport parliamentary constituency. The MP is Caroline Dinenage of the Conservative Party since 2010.

== Geography ==
Hill Head is mainly a shingle beach with sailing, windsurfing, kitesurfing and fishing being the most popular pastimes upon its shores. There is also a small harbour, located where the River Meon enters the Solent. It is next to Titchfield Haven National Nature Reserve.

Hill Head has a substantial elderly population – 33.2% of its 7,100 residents are over 65, compared to an English average of 18.4%. At the 2021 Census the ward population had fallen slightly to 7,100.

== History ==
During World War II, Hill Head was one of many loading zones for the D-Day invasions and the area was inundated with allied troops. Along the coast here there are still many reminders of the war time activities including remnants of fortifications. Part of a Mulberry harbour broke away and was grounded at Hill Head beach. It remained there for many years. Seafield Park, a Royal Navy establishment was nearby.

The Swordfish public house at Hill Head was demolished in 2004 to make way for a small development of beach-front homes known as Swordfish Close. The name Swordfish is derived from the World War Two bomber the Fairey Swordfish which flew from the nearby airfield at RNAS Lee-on-Solent (HMS Daedalus). Swordfish Close has been featured in the BBC television series Seaside Rescue. The pub was previously called the Marine Court Hotel.

For many years the only remaining pub along Hill Head beach-front was the Osborne View, so named as Osborne House (residential home of Queen Victoria) was visible on a clear day. It burnt down in a fire that started at 2.30am on 22 February 2024. Built in the Victorian era and constructed down the cliff over four floors, the Osborne View was a hotel until 1971; regulars included football player and manager Alf Ramsey. In March 2025, permission was granted to demolish and rebuild the pub following an application by Hall and Woodhouse.

Between 1985 and 1990, Hill Head's beaches appeared in the BBC TV show Howards' Way, which was mostly filmed at nearby Bursledon, Hamble-le-Rice, Warsash and Swanwick.

== Transport ==
Bus services to and from Hill Head are provided by First, with a half-hourly circular service to and from Fareham.

== Amenities ==
The area has a convenience store with a post office, a lighting shop, a door and windows shop, two hairdressers, a Chinese takeaway and a prep school.
