= Titchfield Carnival =

Annual event in Titchfield, Hampshire, England

Coordinates: 50.851°N 1.238°W

Titchfield Carnival was an annual event that was held in Titchfield, Hampshire, England, every year from 1880 to 2016, except during World War I, World War II, and 2007. It was organised each year by the Titchfield Bonfire Boys Society, and featured a parade through the village, a funfair, a variety of floats, fireworks, and a bonfire. The carnival was also famous for its beauty queen competition that attracted young girls from all across the town.
