= Mislingford =

Hamlet in Hampshire, England

Coordinates: 50.924628°N 1.164775°W

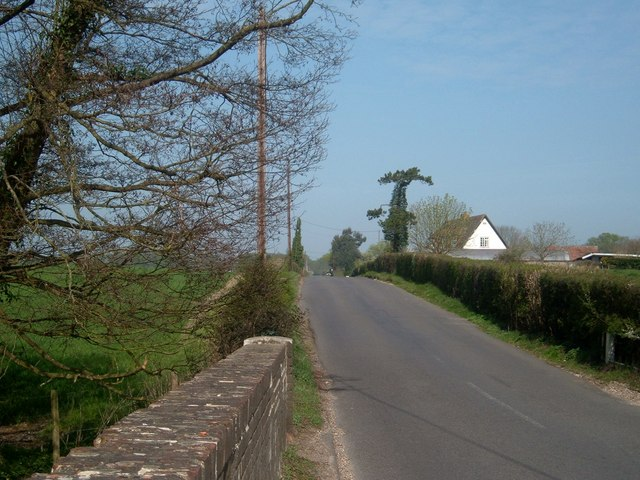

- Location within Hampshire
- OS grid reference: SU6039910178
- Civil parish: Swanmore
- District: Winchester
- Shire county: Hampshire
- Region: South East
- Country: England
- Sovereign state: United Kingdom
- Post town: FAREHAM
- Postcode district: PO17
- Police: Hampshire and Isle of Wight
- Fire: Hampshire and Isle of Wight
- Ambulance: South Central
- UK Parliament: Winchester

Mislingford is a hamlet near the River Meon between the village of Swanmore and the small hamlet of Kingsmead on the A32 road in the City of Winchester district of Hampshire, England. Its nearest town is Fareham, which lies approximately 5 miles (8 km) south-east from the village. Mislingford lies at a point of notable geological significance on the River Meon. Above this location the river flows over chalk, giving it the characteristics of a classic chalk stream; below it, the geology shifts rapidly to London Clay and Reading Sand, visibly changing the nature of the river's habitat. The Environment Agency operates a river level monitoring station at Mislingford, where the River Meon has a recorded average flow of 0.98 cubic metres per second.
