= Albert Atkinson =

England international rugby league footballer

Personal information
- Full name: Albert Atkinson
- Born: 21 May 1910 Fothergill, Cumberland, England
- Died: 1 April 1953 (aged 42) Halifax, England

Playing information
- Position: Loose forward
Club
Years	Team	Pld	T	G	FG	P
1928–36	Halifax	188	33	2	0	103
Representative
Years	Team	Pld	T	G	FG	P
1931–32	Cumberland	2	1	0	0	3

Albert Atkinson (21 May 1910 – 1 April 1953) was an English professional rugby league footballer who played in the 1920s and 1930s. He played at club level for Halifax as a loose forward.

== Background ==
Atkinson was born in Fothergill, Cumberland, England, and he died aged 43 in Halifax, West Riding of Yorkshire, England.

== Playing career ==
=== Halifax ===
Albert Atkinson signed for Halifax aged-18.

Atkinson played loose forward in Halifax's 22-8 victory over York in the 1930–31 Challenge Cup Final during the 1930–31 League season at Wembley Stadium, London on Saturday 2 May 1931, in front of a crowd of 40,368. A native of Fothergill, Atkinson became the first Cumbrian-born player to appear at Wembley.
