= Earl of Southampton Trust =

The Earl of Southampton Trust is a charity in England that provides social housing, and owns 21 almshouses in Titchfield village, Hampshire.

The charity was established in 1620 by Henry Wriothesley, 3rd Earl of Southampton, to support villagers of Titchfield who were struggling because of falling price of wool. In 1897 other local charities were merged to form The Earl of Southampton Charity & Others, including Robert Godfrey's 1597 fund to relieve poverty, and Richard Godwin's 1703 fund to support education for poor children. Focused originally on providing food, clothing, housing, and education, the charity also supported apprenticeships and tradespeople during difficult times.
