= Gosport (constituency) =

UK Parliament constituency (since 1974)

Coordinates: 50.80°N 1.17°W

- Borough constituency for the House of Commons
- Boundaries since 1983
- Boundary of Gosport in South East England
- County: Hampshire
- Electorate: 73,763 (2023)
- Major settlements: Gosport, Stubbington, Lee-on-the-Solent

Current constituency
- Created: 1974
- Member of Parliament: Caroline Dinenage (Conservative)
- Seats: One
- Created from: Gosport & Fareham

Gosport (/ˈɡɒspɔːrt/ GOS-port) is a parliamentary constituency (Note: A borough constituency (for the purposes of election expenses and type of returning officer)) represented in the House of Commons of the UK Parliament since 2010 by Caroline Dinenage of the Conservative Party. (Note: As with all constituencies, the constituency elects one Member of Parliament (MP) by the first past the post system of election at least every five years.) The constituency is anchored by the town and borough of Gosport.

== Boundaries ==
1974–1983: The Municipal Borough of Gosport.

1983–present: The Borough of Gosport, and the Borough of Fareham wards of Hill Head and Stubbington.

The 2023 review of Westminster constituencies left the boundaries unchanged.

The constituency centres on Peel Common, Chalk Common and the River Alver that run north–south — its largest settlement is arguably the eastern town of Gosport. Gosport post town comprises several distinct villages and neighbourhoods on the south coast of England in Hampshire whereas the constituency comprises the whole of Gosport Borough (including Lee-on-the-Solent and Alverstoke) and includes Stubbington and Hill Head from the neighbouring Fareham Borough.

== Constituency profile ==
Gosport has, to date, been a Conservative safe seat, as an area with a majority of privately owned properties that has a minority of poor residents. It has two large housing estates in the south and east of Rowner, for example: according to the 2001 census, these are predominantly social housing, and contain two of the most deprived output areas in terms of income and unemployment in the United Kingdom. However, the area is not of uniform characterisation. Rowner has a central conservation area of expensive housing, and touches, immediately to the west, the Lee on Solent Golf Club, Grange Farm Museum, the West of the Alder Nature Reserve and the Wild Grounds Nature reserve. Beside its bowling green, allotments and recreation ground lies the Grade I-architecture of St Mary's Church. Unlike the generally expensive west of the borough, Rowner resembles central Gosport and Bridgemary in presenting a diverse picture, retaining scenic and generally more rural surroundings than the City of Portsmouth, with some areas of deprivation.

== History ==
The constituency was created for the February 1974 general election. The area had previously been part of the constituency of Gosport and Fareham.

In December 2009, Gosport became the second constituency to vote in an open primary to select the Conservative PPC. All residents of the area were asked to take part via a postal vote. The result of the Gosport primary saw Caroline Dinenage publicly selected. At the general election on 6 May 2010, Caroline Dinenage was elected with 24,300 votes, a majority of 14,413 over her nearest opponent. Since the turn of the century, Labour, UKIP and the Liberal Democrats have all finished in second place.

Peter Viggers (later knighted) had represented the constituency from 1974 to 2010. David Cameron instructed Sir Peter not to stand for re-election after his nationally infamous attempt to claim for a duck house during the MPs' expenses scandal.

== Members of Parliament ==
Gosport & Fareham prior to 1974

| Election | Member | Party |
|---|---|---|
| Feb 1974 | Sir Peter Viggers | Conservative |
| 2010 | Caroline Dinenage | Conservative |

== Elections ==
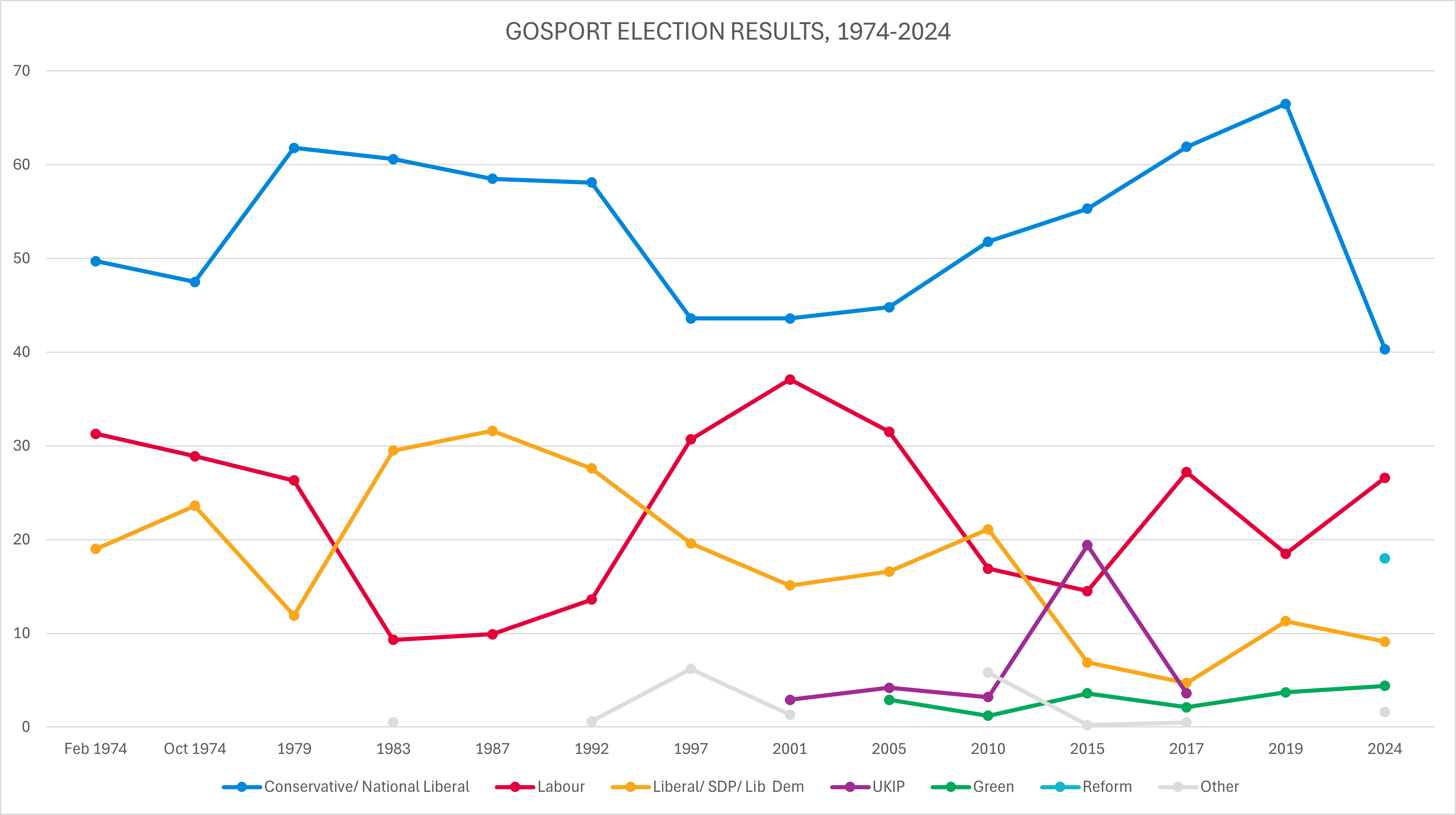
Election results 1974–2024

=== Elections in the 2020s ===
General election 2024: Gosport
| Party | Candidate | Votes | % | ±% |
|---|---|---|---|---|
| Conservative | Caroline Dinenage | 17,830 | 40.3 | −26.2 |
| Labour | Edward Batterbury | 11,776 | 26.6 | +8.1 |
| Reform | Matt Mulliss | 7,983 | 18.0 | New |
| Liberal Democrats | Tim Bearder | 4,039 | 9.1 | −2.2 |
| Green | Tony Sudworth | 1,948 | 4.4 | +0.7 |
| Independent | Jeff Roberts | 334 | 0.8 | New |
| Heritage | Lisa Englefield | 319 | 0.7 | New |
| Hampshire Ind. | Dave Watson | 48 | 0.1 | New |
| Majority | | 6,066 | 13.7 | −34.3 |
| Turnout | | 44,277 | 60.4 | −5.3 |
| Registered electors | | 73,261 | | |
| Conservative hold | | Swing | −17.2 | |

=== Elections in the 2010s ===
General election 2019: Gosport
| Party | Candidate | Votes | % | ±% |
|---|---|---|---|---|
| Conservative | Caroline Dinenage | 32,226 | 66.5 | +4.6 |
| Labour | Tom Chatwin | 8,948 | 18.5 | −8.7 |
| Liberal Democrats | Martin Pepper | 5,473 | 11.3 | +6.6 |
| Green | Zoe Aspinall | 1,806 | 3.7 | +1.6 |
| Majority | | 23,278 | 48.0 | +13.3 |
| Turnout | | 48,453 | 65.9 | −0.8 |
| Conservative hold | | Swing | +6.6 | |

General election 2017: Gosport
| Party | Candidate | Votes | % | ±% |
|---|---|---|---|---|
| Conservative | Caroline Dinenage | 30,647 | 61.9 | +6.6 |
| Labour | Alan Durrant | 13,436 | 27.2 | +12.7 |
| Liberal Democrats | Bruce Tennent | 2,328 | 4.7 | −2.2 |
| UKIP | Chloe Palmer | 1,790 | 3.6 | −15.8 |
| Green | Monica Cassidy | 1,024 | 2.1 | −1.5 |
| Independent | Jeffrey Roberts | 256 | 0.5 | +0.3 |
| Majority | | 17,211 | 34.7 | −1.2 |
| Turnout | | 49,481 | 66.7 | +1.6 |
| Conservative hold | | Swing | −3.0 | |

General election 2015: Gosport
| Party | Candidate | Votes | % | ±% |
|---|---|---|---|---|
| Conservative | Caroline Dinenage | 26,364 | 55.3 | +3.5 |
| UKIP | Christopher Wood | 9,266 | 19.4 | +16.2 |
| Labour | Alan Durrant | 6,926 | 14.5 | −2.4 |
| Liberal Democrats | Rob Hylands | 3,298 | 6.9 | −14.2 |
| Green | Monica Cassidy | 1,707 | 3.6 | +2.4 |
| Independent | Jeffrey Roberts | 104 | 0.2 | New |
| Majority | | 17,098 | 35.9 | +5.2 |
| Turnout | | 47,662 | 65.1 | +0.5 |
| Conservative hold | | Swing | −6.4 | |

General election 2010: Gosport
| Party | Candidate | Votes | % | ±% |
|---|---|---|---|---|
| Conservative | Caroline Dinenage | 24,300 | 51.8 | +7.0 |
| Liberal Democrats | Rob Hylands | 9,887 | 21.1 | +4.5 |
| Labour | Graham Giles | 7,944 | 16.9 | −14.6 |
| UKIP | Andrew Rice | 1,496 | 3.2 | −1.0 |
| BNP | Barry Bennett | 1,004 | 2.1 | New |
| English Democrat | Bob Shaw | 622 | 1.3 | New |
| Green | Claire Smith | 573 | 1.2 | −1.7 |
| Independent | Dave Smith | 493 | 1.1 | New |
| Independent | Charlie Read | 331 | 0.7 | New |
| Independent | Brian Hart | 289 | 0.6 | New |
| Majority | | 14,413 | 30.7 | +17.4 |
| Turnout | | 46,939 | 64.6 | +4.1 |
| Conservative hold | | Swing | +1.3 | |

=== Elections in the 2000s ===
General election 2005: Gosport
| Party | Candidate | Votes | % | ±% |
|---|---|---|---|---|
| Conservative | Peter Viggers | 19,268 | 44.8 | +1.2 |
| Labour | Richard Williams | 13,538 | 31.5 | −5.6 |
| Liberal Democrats | Roger Roberts | 7,145 | 16.6 | +1.5 |
| UKIP | John Bowles | 1,825 | 4.2 | +1.3 |
| Green | Claire Smith | 1,258 | 2.9 | New |
| Majority | | 5,730 | 13.3 | +6.8 |
| Turnout | | 43,034 | 60.5 | +3.4 |
| Conservative hold | | Swing | +3.4 | |

General election 2001: Gosport
| Party | Candidate | Votes | % | ±% |
|---|---|---|---|---|
| Conservative | Peter Viggers | 17,364 | 43.6 | ±0.0 |
| Labour | Richard Williams | 14,743 | 37.1 | +6.4 |
| Liberal Democrats | Roger Roberts | 6,011 | 15.1 | −4.5 |
| UKIP | John Bowles | 1,162 | 2.9 | New |
| Socialist Labour | Kevin Chetwynd | 509 | 1.3 | New |
| Majority | | 2,621 | 6.5 | −6.4 |
| Turnout | | 39,789 | 57.1 | −13.2 |
| Conservative hold | | Swing | −3.2 | |

=== Elections in the 1990s ===
General election 1997: Gosport
| Party | Candidate | Votes | % | ±% |
|---|---|---|---|---|
| Conservative | Peter Viggers | 21,085 | 43.6 | −14.5 |
| Labour | Ivan Gray | 14,827 | 30.7 | +17.1 |
| Liberal Democrats | Steve Hogg | 9,479 | 19.6 | −8.0 |
| Referendum | Andrew Blowers | 2,538 | 5.3 | New |
| Independent | Patrick Ettie | 426 | 0.9 | New |
| Majority | | 6,258 | 12.9 | −17.6 |
| Turnout | | 48,355 | 70.3 | −6.3 |
| Conservative hold | | Swing | | |

General election 1992: Gosport
| Party | Candidate | Votes | % | ±% |
|---|---|---|---|---|
| Conservative | Peter Viggers | 31,094 | 58.1 | −0.4 |
| Liberal Democrats | MG Russell | 14,776 | 27.6 | −4.0 |
| Labour | Mrs MF Angus | 7,275 | 13.6 | +3.7 |
| Independent | PFF Ettie | 332 | 0.6 | New |
| Majority | | 16,318 | 30.5 | +3.6 |
| Turnout | | 53,477 | 76.6 | +1.8 |
| Conservative hold | | Swing | +1.8 | |

=== Elections in the 1980s ===
General election 1987: Gosport
| Party | Candidate | Votes | % | ±% |
|---|---|---|---|---|
| Conservative | Peter Viggers | 29,804 | 58.5 | −2.1 |
| Liberal | Peter John Chegwyn | 16,081 | 31.6 | +2.1 |
| Labour | Alan Lloyd | 5,053 | 9.9 | +0.6 |
| Majority | | 13,723 | 26.9 | −4.2 |
| Turnout | | 50,938 | 74.8 | +3.2 |
| Conservative hold | | Swing | −2.1 | |

General election 1983: Gosport
| Party | Candidate | Votes | % | ±% |
|---|---|---|---|---|
| Conservative | Peter Viggers | 28,179 | 60.6 | |
| Liberal | Peter John Chegwyn | 13,728 | 29.5 | |
| Labour | Bernard Bond | 4,319 | 9.3 | |
| Independent | R.A. MacMillan | 241 | 0.5 | New |
| Majority | | 14,451 | 31.1 | −4.4 |
| Turnout | | 46,467 | 71.6 | −5.9 |
| Conservative hold | | Swing | | |

=== Elections in the 1970s ===
General election 1979: Gosport
| Party | Candidate | Votes | % | ±% |
|---|---|---|---|---|
| Conservative | Peter Viggers | 24,553 | 61.8 | +14.3 |
| Labour | John Slater | 10,460 | 26.3 | −2.6 |
| Liberal | N.C. Lewis | 4,741 | 11.9 | −11.7 |
| Majority | | 14,093 | 35.5 | +16.9 |
| Turnout | | 39,754 | 77.5 | +2.2 |
| Conservative hold | | Swing | +5.9 | |

General election October 1974: Gosport
| Party | Candidate | Votes | % | ±% |
|---|---|---|---|---|
| Conservative | Peter Viggers | 17,487 | 47.5 | −2.2 |
| Labour | Peter Marsh Tebbutt | 10,621 | 28.9 | −2.4 |
| Liberal | Peter Dane Clark | 8,701 | 23.6 | +4.6 |
| Majority | | 6,866 | 18.6 | +0.2 |
| Turnout | | 36,809 | 75.3 | −6.1 |
| Conservative hold | | Swing | +0.1 | |

General election February 1974: Gosport
| Party | Candidate | Votes | % | ±% |
|---|---|---|---|---|
| Conservative | Peter Viggers | 19,563 | 49.7 | |
| Labour | Graham John Hewitt | 12,335 | 31.3 | |
| Liberal | John George Rodway Rix | 7,485 | 19.0 | |
| Majority | | 7,228 | 18.4 | |
| Turnout | | 39,383 | 81.4 | |
| Conservative win (new seat) | | | | |

== See also ==
- Fareham
- parliamentary constituencies in Hampshire
- List of parliamentary constituencies in the South East England (region)
