= Titchfield Canal =

Channel in UK

Coordinates: 50.851°N 1.238°W

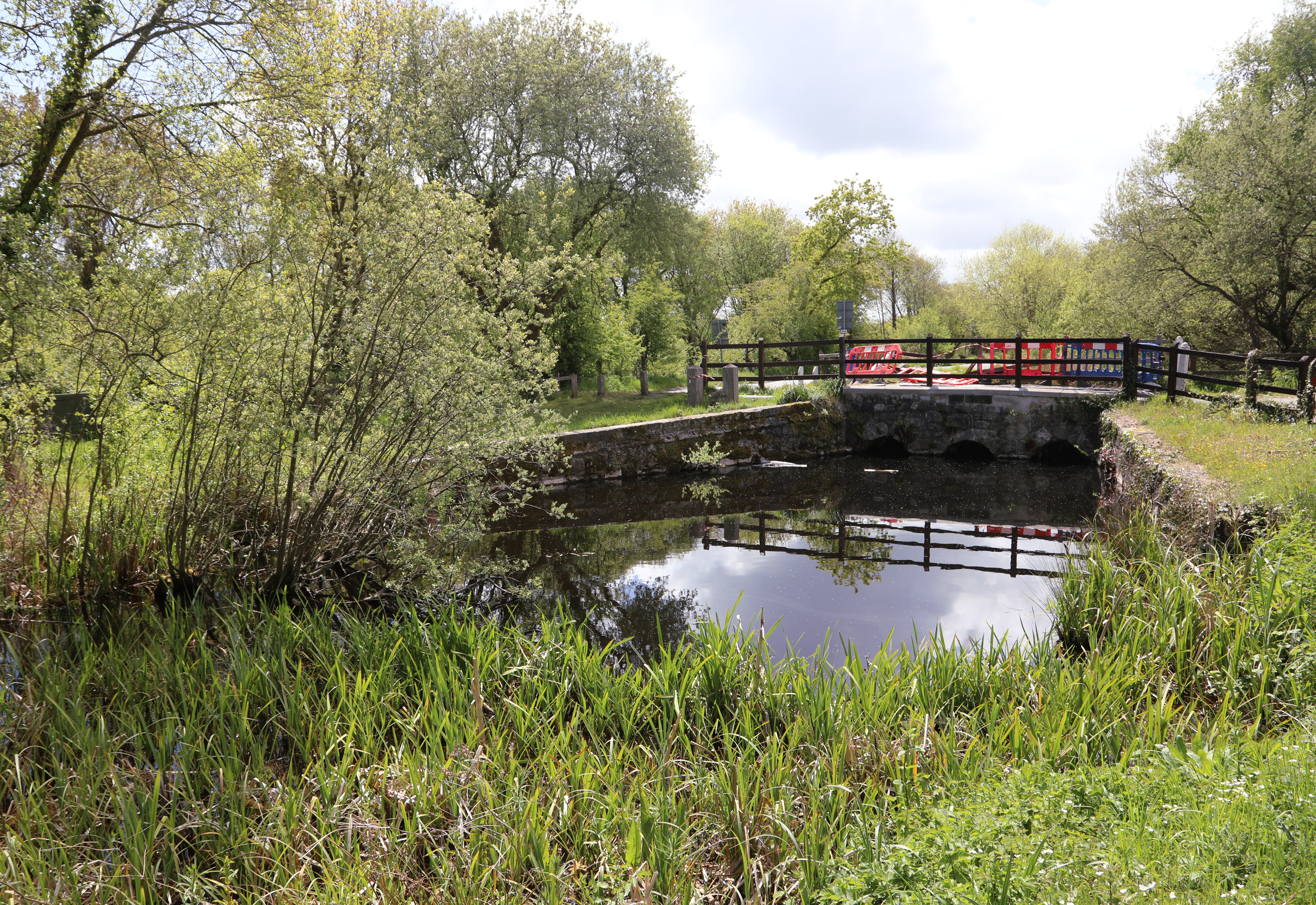
The site of the flash lock on the canal

The Titchfield Canal is a two-mile (3.2 km) watercourse between the village of Titchfield, Hampshire, and the coast at Titchfield Haven. Lying above and roughly parallel to the nearby River Meon, it is an artificial watercouse, but its origins and purpose have been debated.

== See also ==
- Canals of Great Britain
- History of the British canal system
