= Upton Court Grammar School =

Location
- Lascelles Road; Slough, Berkshire, SL3 7PR; England; 51.504°N 0.577°W

Information
- Type: Grammar academy
- Motto: Ad Astra "To the stars"
- Established: January 1912
- Department for Education URN: 136420 Tables
- Ofsted: Reports
- Principal: Oliver King
- Gender: Co educational
- Age: 11 to 18
- Enrolment: 1,106 (6th form 461)
- Website: http://www.uptoncourtgrammar.org.uk

Upton Court Grammar School is a fully selective academy school in Lascelles Road, Slough, Berkshire.

The school has specialisms in languages and science. It is also a Leading Edge School, an ICT-Focus School, a Training School, an International School under the International Baccalaureate Organization (IBO) and a participant in the Primary Language Initiative. From September 2004 it offered some International Baccalaureate courses alongside its conventional secondary and sixth form courses, but these are now discontinued.

== History ==
=== Slough Secondary School (1912–36) ===
Slough Secondary School was the name of the first major selective secondary school in Slough (originally Buckinghamshire but now Berkshire). It was founded in 1912 just to the west of William Street, in the town centre. By 1936, the School had outgrown its premises and was split into Slough Grammar School for boys (1936–82) in Lascelles Road and Slough High School for girls (1936–82) in Twinches Lane, although the girls stayed on in the William Street buildings until 1939 when their new buildings were ready.

The original Slough Secondary School buildings in William Street were re-used during the Second World War and afterwards as temporary school accommodation. They were redeveloped in the 1960s as the tower blocks of Slough College, which became the Slough Campus of Thames Valley University. The area is being redeveloped again, under the Heart of Slough project.

Headmasters

1. W. Francis Smith (1912–25)
2. Ben Llewellyn (Acting) (1923–25)
3. Edward Rudland Clarke, (1925-36) and continued at Slough Grammar School for Boys until 1952

=== Slough Grammar School for Boys (1936–82) ===
Slough Grammar School for Boys was a boys' selective grammar school in Slough. It was created when the predecessor school, Slough Secondary School, split into separate boys' and girls' schools in 1936. It moved into purpose-built premises at Lascelles Road, which are still used by the current school.

Headmasters

1. Edward Rudland Clarke (1936–52) having started at Slough Secondary School in 1925
2. Tom Anderson (Acting) (1952)
3. Wilfrid Long (1952–66)
4. Gerald H Painter (1966–82) and continued at Upton Grammar School until 1988

=== Slough High School for Girls (1936–82) ===
Slough High School was a girls' selective grammar school in Slough, Buckinghamshire, now Berkshire. It was formed in 1936 from the split of Slough Secondary School (1912–36) into separate girls' and boys' schools. For the first three years of its existence, it occupied the former Slough Secondary School buildings in William Street, but, in 1939, it moved to new buildings in Twinches Lane, Cippenham.

In 1982, when the Twinches Lane site was sold for redevelopment, Slough Grammar School and Slough High School merged to form Upton Grammar School (1982–93), based on the Lascelles Road site of Slough Grammar School.

Headmistresses

1. Miss J M Crawford (1936–62)
2. Gwyneth R J Owen (1962–78)
3. Pamela A Reakes (1978–82)

=== Upton Grammar School (1982–93) ===
Upton Grammar School in Lascelles Road, Slough, was formed in 1982 by the re-merger of Slough Grammar School for boys (1936–82) and Slough High School for girls (1936–82), when the High School's Twinches Lane site was sold for redevelopment. The combined school was renamed Upton Grammar School to underline the merger of two equals.

Head teachers

1. Gerald H Painter (1982–88) having started as headmaster of Slough Grammar School for Boys in 1966
2. Margaret A Lenton (1988–93) and continued at Slough Grammar School until 2010

=== Slough Grammar School (1993–2013) ===
In 1993, Upton Grammar School's name reverted to Slough Grammar School while retaining its co-educational status, the previous school of this name having been single-sex status. The school converted into an academy in 2011.

Principals

1. Margaret A Lenton (1993–2010) having started at Upton Grammar School in 1988
2. Mercedes Hernández Estrada (2010–13) and continued at Upton Court Grammar School until 2017

=== Upton Court Grammar School (2013–present) ===
In 2013, the principal, Mercedes Hernández Estrada, and the governors converted the school's name to Upton Court Grammar School. The chained swan logo was replaced by a phoenix rising. The School is also assisting three local schools – Foxborough Primary School, Trevelyan Middle School and Desborough College via Pioneer Educational Trust.

Principals

1. Mercedes Hernández Estrada (2013–2017) having started at Slough Grammar School in 2010
2. Mark Pritchard (2017–2023)
3. Oliver King (2023-present)

== Academic performance and inspections ==
The 2008 Ofsted inspection report described Slough Grammar as "outstanding"; the 2011 interim assessment confirmed that the standards were unchanged. In 2014 an inspection by Ofsted gave the school an overall rating of "Outstanding", although the sixth form was rated "Good", with concerns raised over the number of students unable to progress from AS level to A2 level studies due to poor grades.

The Good Schools Guide describes Upton Court Grammar as a multicultural school that has achieved a remarkably happy coexistence of students from diverse ethnic backgrounds.

== Old Paludians ==
The term "Paludian" for former students of the school(s) is derived from the Latin word palus (genitive paludis), meaning a marsh or slough. The term was first coined by the Headmaster, W. Francis Smith, in 1915, when the Old Paludians Association was formed, and has been in continuous use ever since. "Old Paludians" is sometimes informally contracted to "Old Pals".

In 1936, the Association split into the Boys (or Sports) section and the Girls section. By the 1950s, the Boys section reformed to become the Old Paludians Ltd. They moved to Taplow and nowadays play as Taplow United.

Meanwhile, the Girls' section became the current Old Paludians Association and organises annual reunions for former students, both boys and girls.

Former students

- Steve Bell – cartoonist
- Matthew Benham - owner of Brentford F.C.
- Jeremy Black (1951–2004) – assyriologist
- William Bradshaw, Baron Bradshaw
- Laurie Brokenshire CBE, RN (1952–2017) - puzzle specialist, magician
- Susan Cooper - children's author (Slough High School)
- Richard John Cork, DSO, DFC (1917–1944) - WWII Fighter ace
- Dennis Edwards (1937–2019) - footballer
- John Fothergill – Pro-Vice Chancellor, City University London
- Philip Hinchcliffe – TV producer
- Jeanne Hoban – trade unionist and activist (Slough High School)
- Peter Robert Marler (1928–2014) – emeritus professor of neurobiology, physiology and ethology, University of California
- Gary Numan – cult musician
- John Frederick Pickering (1939–2018) – professor of economics (Slough Grammar School)
- Beryl Platt, Baroness Platt of Writtle (née Myatt, 1923–2015) – aviation specialist and politician (Slough High School for Girls)
- Martin Schröder – Vice President and Dean of Engineering and Physical Science, Professor of Chemistry University of Manchester
- Ian Simmons – emeritus professor of geography, University of Durham
- Matthew Spriggs – professor of archaeology, Australian National University
- Kirith Entwhistle - MP for Bolton East
