= Titchfield Haven =

Inlet in Hampshire, England

Coordinates: 50.827°N 1.238°W

- Site of Special Scientific Interest
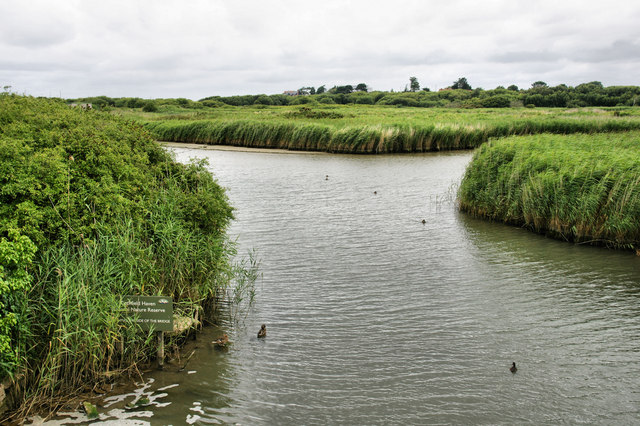
- Location of Titchfield Haven.
- Area of search: Hampshire
- Grid reference: SU 538 033
- Interest: Biological
- Area: 134.5 hectares (332 acres)
- Notification date: 1983
- Location map: Magic Map

Titchfield Haven is a 134.5-hectare (332-acre) biological Site of Special Scientific Interest north-west of Gosport in Hampshire. Most of it is a local nature reserve and a national nature reserve. It is part of Solent and Southampton Water Ramsar site and Special Protection Area.

== History ==
Until late in the 16th century, the River Meon was navigable as far as Titchfield, which at that time was a significant port. However silting started to restrict the passage of ships, and in order to maintain Titchfield's status as a port, the Earl of Southampton proposed that a canal should be constructed. The Titchfield Canal opened in 1611 and was only the second canal existing in Britain at the time. Unfortunately the canal also suffered from silting and the sea trade moved to nearby Southampton and Portsmouth. As part of the construction of the canal, the outfall of the River Meon to the sea was dammed, creating the wetlands that now form the nature reserve.

== Ecology ==
This was formerly a tidal estuary, but one way valves block salt water and it is now freshwater river and marshes, wet meadows bisected by ditches, and fen. It is important for wetland breeding birds, such as bearded reedlings, sedge warblers and reed warblers.

The site is managed to provide ideal conditions at different times of the year, with water levels lowered at the end of the waterfowl breeding season in order to expose food-rich mud to encourage migrating birds. Other areas of water are cleared in order to attract dragonflies and damselflies. Frogbit and flowering rush are also encouraged to grow because of this water management. Other flora include slender bird's-foot-trefoil and marsh mallow. The site is a winter refuge for ducks, geese and wading birds and avocet are known to use the location as a breeding ground in the summer months. The Walkway Pond is home to dragonflies, damselflies, moorhen, mallard and a variety of warblers. Water voles have been reintroduced to the reserve and the River Meon, as part of a project by South Downs National Park, Hampshire & Isle of Wight Wildlife Trust and The Environment Agency. The reserve has a number of hides, Cottage Hide, Meon Shore Hide, Knights Bank Hide, Meadow Hide, Pumfrett Hide, Spurgin Hide, Suffern Hide and West Hide, from which it is possible to observe the local wildlife, which includes fox and deer as well as waterfowl.

== Amenities ==
The site is open seven days a week, including Bank Holidays (excluding 25 and 26 December) 9.30am - 5pm during the summer and 9.30am - 4pm in the winter. Admission is by ticket, available from the Titchfield Haven Visitor Centre. Car parking is available close to the Reserve at the Hove To Car Park and also on the Sea Front - Chargeable from 10:00 to 18:00. The site has toilets (with wheelchair access), a tea room, a shop and an exhibition in the Visitor Centre. In 2022, Hampshire County Council declared its intention to close and sell the visitor centre.
