= Strategic Advisory Board for Intellectual Property Policy =

British non-departmental public body

The Strategic Advisory Board for Intellectual Property Policy (SABIP) was a non-departmental public body that provided the UK Government with advice on intellectual property policy. In 2010 the Board was merged with the Intellectual Property Office.

SABIP’s role was to commission research in order to provide Policy makers with strategic, independent, and evidence-based advice on intellectual property policy.

It was created on 2 June 2008 and the last chairman was Joly Dixon.

In May 2009 it published a report into unauthorised downloading. In September 2009, the BBC Radio 4 statistics programme More or Less investigated the SABIP's claim that seven million citizens of the United Kingdom (with a population of sixty-one million) were engaged in file-sharing. The programme claimed that the figure had been extrapolated from a study commissioned by the British Phonographic Industry. The study showed that 11.6% of respondents admitted to file sharing, which was later adjusted up to 16.3% based on the assumption that some people would not admit to file-sharing. The show also claimed that the BPI had used its own estimate of forty million subscribers instead of the official Office for National Statistics estimate of thirty-four million, and thus offered a more conservative estimate of 3.9 to 5.6 million file-sharers based on the study alone.

In November 2009, SABIP and the intellectual Property Office (IPO) jointly launched a programme of work as outlined in The Economic Value of IP: Research Agenda and Plan of Action. The aim of the work programme was to increase understanding of the economic effects of IP and the intellectual property rights system, in partnership with national and international research organisations.

The launch was hosted by David Lammy MP, Minister of State for Higher Education & Intellectual Property, and builds on work outlined at a Forum which took place on 10 June 2009. Attendees at the Forum included stakeholders from industry, academics, and policy-makers. The Forum was also chaired by David Lammy MP.

In January 2010, SABIP published Changing Attitudes and Behaviour in the 'Non-Internet' Digital World and their Implications for Intellectual Property. The report undertook the first comprehensive review of currently available national and international research into consumers’ attitudes and behaviours to obtaining and sharing digital content offline.

In July 2010, it was announced that the board would be closed in the next year, with responsibilities passing to the Intellectual Property Office.
