= John Milner Fothergill =

British physician and medical writer

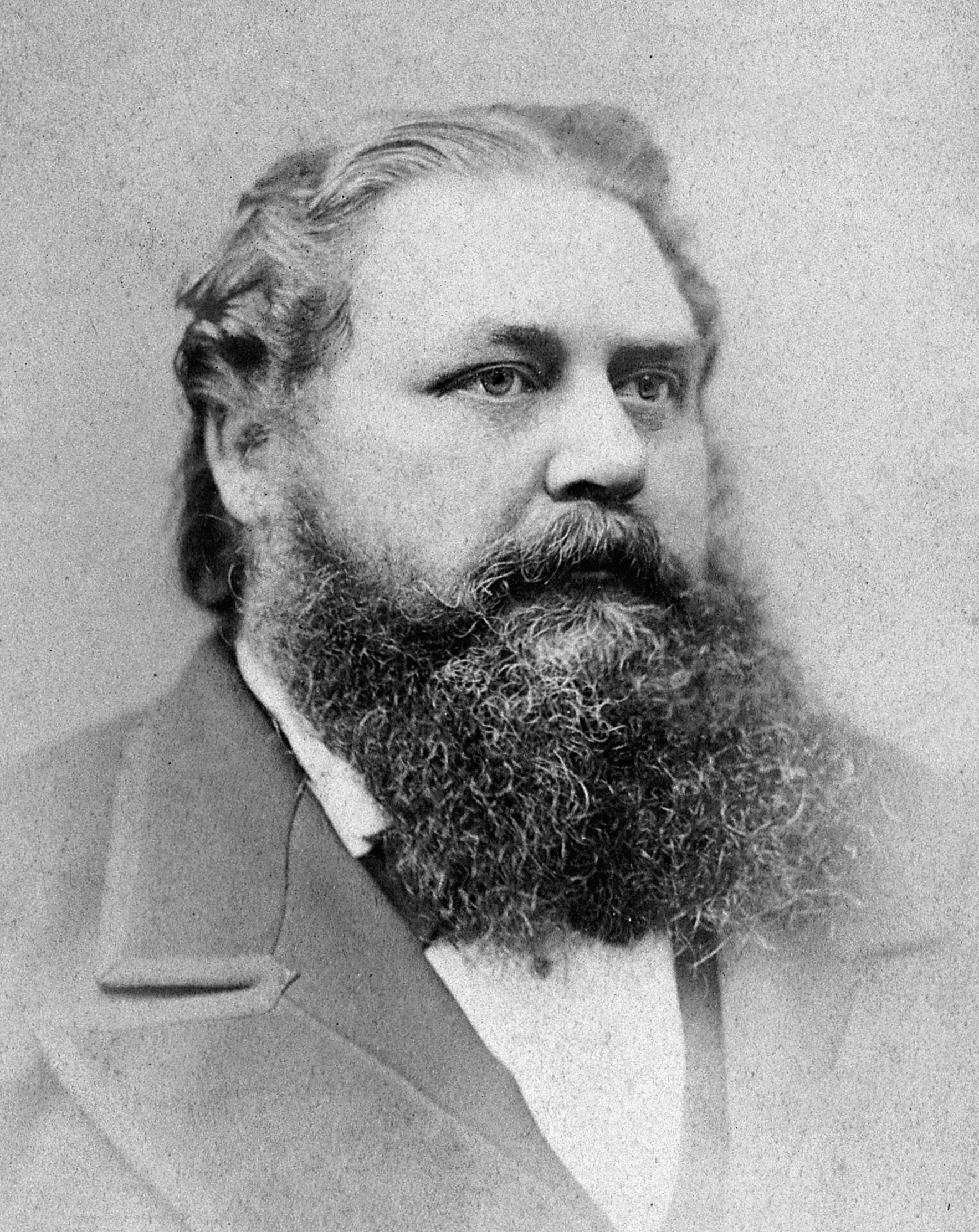
- Born: 11 April 1841; Morland, Westmorland, United Kingdom
- Died: 28 June 1888 (aged 47); Cavendish Square, London, United Kingdom
- Occupation: Physician
- Known for: Medical writings

John Milner Fothergill, M.D. (11 April 1841 – 28 June 1888), was a British physician and medical writer.

== Biography ==
Fothergill, son of surgeon George Fothergill and his wife Sarah Milner, was born at Morland, Westmorland, on 11 April 1841, studied at the University of Edinburgh, and there graduated M.D. 1865. He afterwards studied at Vienna and Berlin and began professional work as a general practitioner at Morland. Soon after moved to Leeds, and in 1872 came to London, where he was admitted as a member of the Royal College of Physicians and endeavoured to get into practice as a physician. He obtained appointments at two small hospitals, the City of London Hospital for Diseases of the Chest and the West London Hospital; but when asked some years later how he throve, replied, "The private patient seems to me to be an extinct animal."

He was a man of enormous weight, with a large head and very thick neck, and so continued until he died of diabetes, from which and from gout he had long suffered. He resided in Henrietta Street, Cavendish Square, London, and there died on 28 June 1888. He is buried on the eastern side of Highgate Cemetery.

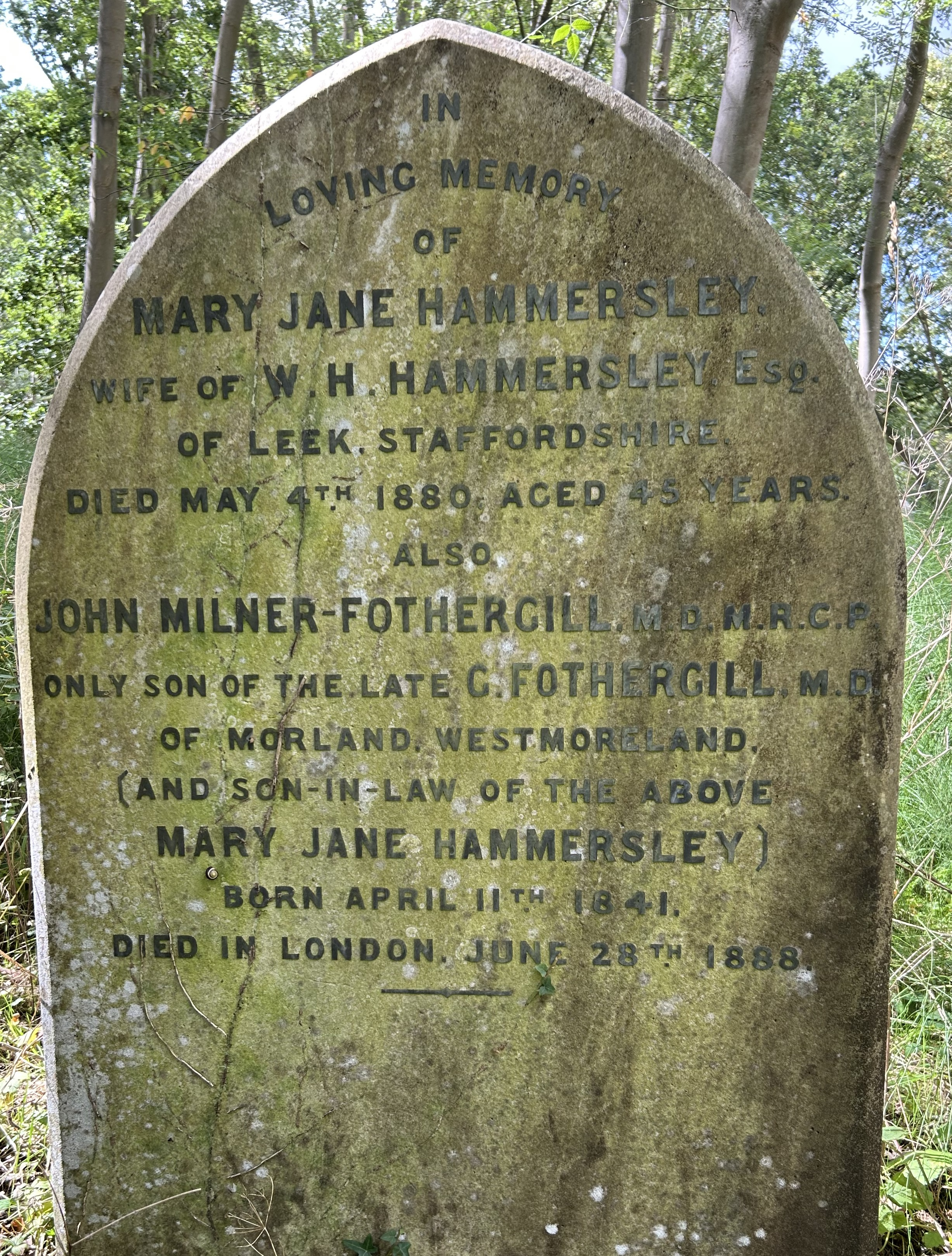
Grave of John Milner Fothergill in Highgate Cemetery

== Writings ==
Among Fothergill's works are The Heart and its Diseases, The Practitioner's Handbook of Treatment, The Physical Factor in Diagnosis, Vaso renal Change versus Bright's Disease, and his posthumous The Town Dweller: His Needs and His Wants. In his writings his expressions about those with whom he did not agree are violent, and he often made positive general assertions without sufficient grounds for them; but he sometimes admitted his errors, and struggled hard with numerous difficulties in life.

The Dictionary of National Biography records that "a distinguished lecturer on materia medica" has expressed the opinion that the most valuable of Fothergill's writings are An Essay on the Action of Digitalis, written in his early life, and The Antagonism of Therapeutic Agents, and what it teaches, published in 1878.

== Selected publications ==
- The Heart and its Diseases With Their Treatment (1879)
- A Presumptive Diagnosis of Gout (1881)
- Gout in its Protean Aspects (1883)
- The Physiological Factor in Diagnosis (1883)
- A Manual of Dietetics (1886)
- The Will Power: Its Range in Action (1888)
