= John Fothergill (priest) =

The Ven. John Fothergill (1808–1851) was the inaugural Archdeacon of Berbice.

He was baptised at on 26 October 1808. He was Rector of St Patrick, Berbice; and Ecclesiastical Commissary for British Guiana. His last post was as Vicar of Vicar of Bridekirk. He died on 8 May 1851.
