= Anthony Fothergill (theologian) =

English theological writer

Anthony Fothergill (1686–1761), was an English theological writer.

Fothergill was the youngest son of Thomas Fothergill of Brownber, Ravenstonedale, Westmorland. Like his forefathers and descendants for many generations he owned Brownber, and lived and died there. Though he is said to have had no liberal education, he published several theological works, the longest of which was titled Wicked Christians Practical Atheists, or Free Thoughts of a Plain Man on the Doctrines and Duties of Religion in general, and of christianity in particular, compared and contrasted with the Faith and Practice of Protestants of every Denomination so far as either have come under the observation or to the knowledge of the Author (1754) Anthony Fothergill, a husbandman in the county of Westmorland. The description husbandman is no doubt an attempt at a translation of the Lake country statesman.

This work was followed by two pamphlets: A Modest Inquiry how far the Thirty-nine Articles of the Church of England and the Creed ascribed to St. Athanasius are consistent with and supported by one another and how far they are also consistent with the Declarations of Jesus Christ and the Doctrines of His Apostles (1755) and The Fall of Man; an Enquiry into the Nature of that Event and how far the Posterity of Adam are involved in the guilt of his Transgression, addressed to all, but particularly preachers who embrace the doctrine of original sin (1756).

It is stated that he also wrote some things in verse and contributed to the Monthly Review. He seems to have acted as the parish lawyer. The parishioners in Ravenstonedale church put up a brass plate to his memory, bearing an inscription, which concludes:

To the Memory of Anthony Fothergill of Brownber Whose natural Talents and acquir'd Knowledge Rendered his character truely respectable. Tho' plac'd in a private station He distinguished Himself by a firm adherence To the cause of Truth, Liberty and rational Religion. His integrity of Heart, Social Disposition, And uncommon abilities gained him general esteem. He departed this (His chequer'd Life) June 13th 1761 aged 75.
