= Titchfield =

Village and parish in Hampshire, England

Coordinates: 50.849084°N 1.234396°W

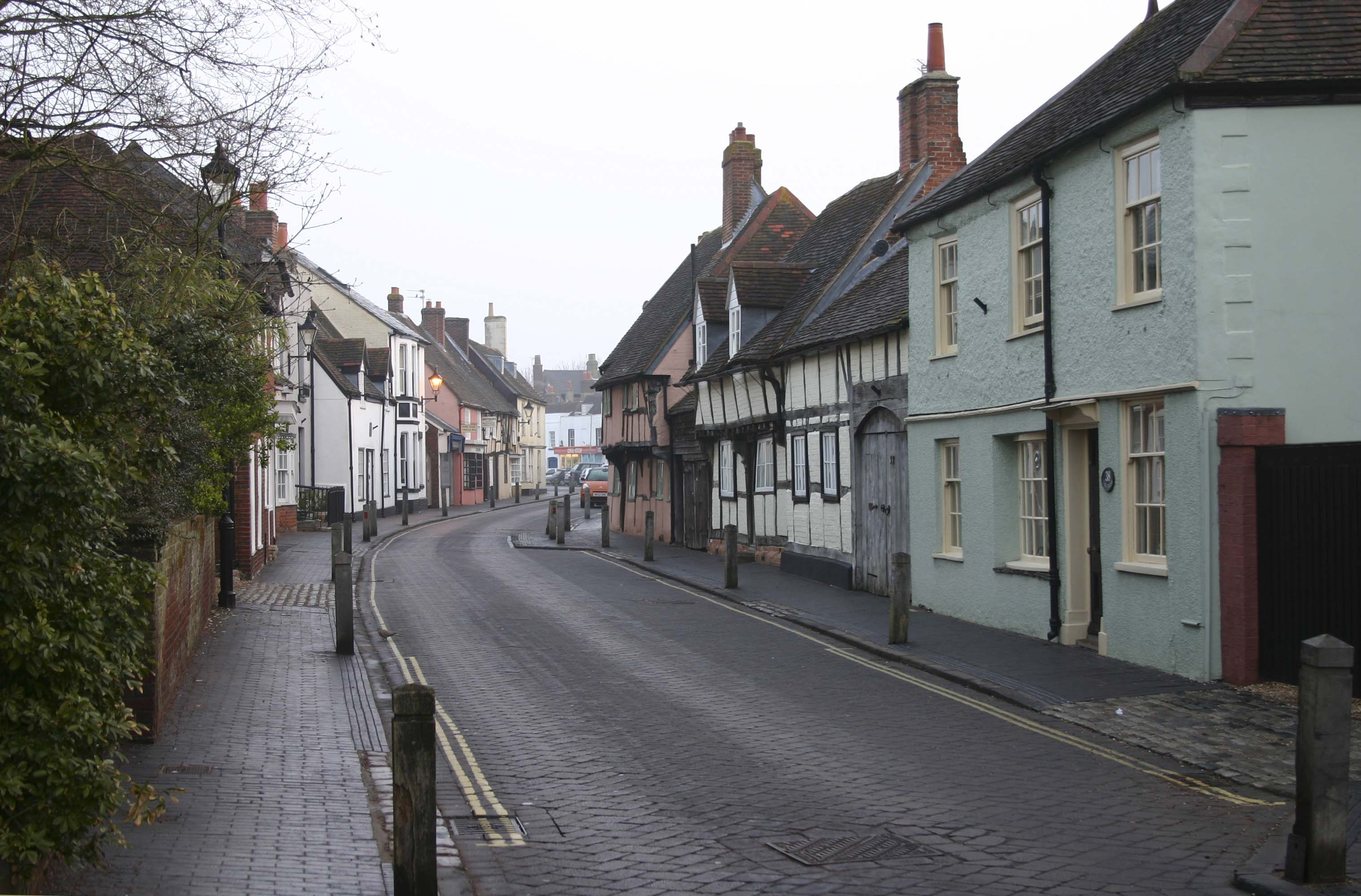
- South Street, looking towards the square

- Location within Hampshire
- Population: 7,280 (2011 Census. Fareham Ward)
- District: Fareham
- Shire county: Hampshire
- Region: South East
- Country: England
- Sovereign state: United Kingdom
- Post town: FAREHAM
- Postcode district: PO14 - PO15
- Dialling code: 01329
- Police: Hampshire and Isle of Wight
- Fire: Hampshire and Isle of Wight
- Ambulance: South Central
- UK Parliament: Hamble Valley

Titchfield is a village and former civil parish in the Fareham district, in southern Hampshire, England, by the River Meon. The village has a history stretching back to the sixth century. During the medieval period, the village operated a small port and market. Near to the village are the ruins of Titchfield Abbey, a place with strong associations with Shakespeare, through his patron, the Earl of Southampton.

== Geography ==
To the east of Titchfield lies the town of Fareham, to the south are Stubbington, Hill Head and the Solent, to the west is Locks Heath, Warsash, the River Hamble and Southampton and to the north is Whiteley, Park Gate and Swanwick. Titchfield forms part of the Borough of Fareham, having been added to the Fareham urban district in 1932.

Several miles to the south of the village, at the mouth of the River Meon and on the shores of the Solent, is Titchfield Haven National Nature Reserve, where there is a small harbour that dries out at low tide. Inland is a Nature Reserve which is an important breeding and visiting ground for many species of birds and wildfowl (and is open to visitors at certain periods).

Near to the village and the haven lies the Titchfield Canal, earlier known as the New River. It has been suggested that this is the second oldest canal in England, completed in 1611 (Exeter was the first). However, as late as 1676 two tenants, John Cooper and John Landy, complained in the Manorial Court that the Lord of the Manor "by Cutting ye new River hath taken away and doth detain" parts of their copyholds, implying that in 1676 the construction was recent. It lies close to Titchfield Haven, concealed by a bridge with the remains of a sea-lock at the south end. A footpath follows the canal to Titchfield village. It was certainly used for flooding the water meadows, traces of which can still be clearly seen. Whether it was ever used as a navigation channel is still debated. The Earl of Southampton ordered the river to be sealed off from the sea by a wall which was an unpopular move with the villagers as it ultimately ended Titchfield's role as a port.

== History ==
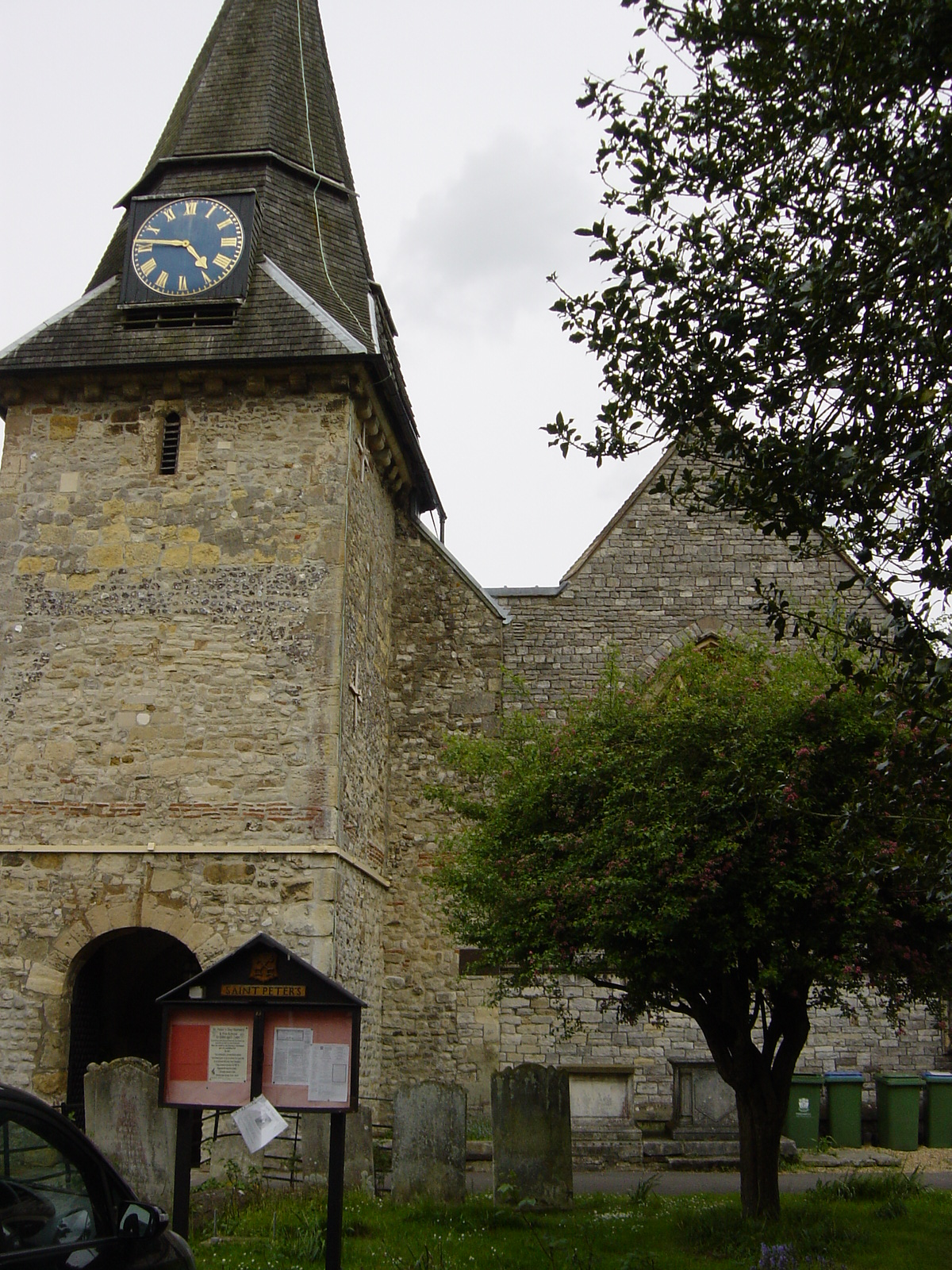
Titchfield St Peter's Church in 2006

The first people mentioned as inhabiting the area were a Jutish tribe, the Meonwara. The tribe were part of the Jutes originating from Denmark who founded the village during the sixth century. The name of Titchfield comes from the Old English ticcen, meaning kid or young goat, and feld, meaning field. Therefore, the meaning of Titchfield is 'open lands where kids are kept'.

=== St Peter's Church, Titchfield ===
St Peter's Church, Titchfield, was established in about 680 making it one of the oldest used churches in England. Though only a few parts of the original structure survive, the church contains a mixture of building styles, since it was expanded and redeveloped to include additional space. Within the church is the resplendent tomb of Thomas Wriothesley, 1st Earl of Southampton, who when Lord Chancellor, personally tortured Anne Askew.

Domesday Book mentions "Ticefelle": with a mill, a market and farms. It was a successful community, though tiny by today's standards with a population of 160. The Domesday Book entry for Titchfield states "The King holds TICEFELLE. It is a berewick, and belongs to MENESTOCHES. King Edward held it. There are 2 hides; but they have not paid geld. (There) is land for 15 ploughs. In (the) demesne (there are) but 2 oxen (animalia), and (there are) 16 villeins and 13 borders with 9 ploughs. There are 4 serfs, and a mill worth 20 shillings. The market and toll (are worth) 40 shillings."

A further variation in the spelling may be seen in a Mediaeval legal record, where it appears as "Thechefeld"

...where the defendant Thomas Lyon, husbandman, lives, as does John Baker, a fuller...

Titchfield has long been a centre for business, with the village once having a small port. There were also tanneries (some of the buildings still exist), a market, a fair, brewers, craftsmen, traders and other business people. It is recorded that Henry V before Agincourt and Charles I before his imprisonment at Carisbrooke rested in the town.

A Market Hall was built in Titchfield Square by the 3rd Earl of Southampton in the early 17th century. This was moved behind the Queen's Head Public House in 1810. In 1801 Titchfield had a population of almost 3,000. In 1865 a gas company provided gaslight to the village and in 1894 Titchfield was given a parish council.

In 1970, with the market hall in a derelict state, it was bought by the Weald and Downland Open Air Museum. The entire hall was dismantled and moved to Singleton where it now stands restored in the centre of a new (old) village.

At the 2001 census, the population of the village was estimated at 7,000.

== Civil parish ==
In 1931 the parish had a population of 2,366. On 1 April 1932 the parish was abolished and merged with Fareham, part also went to form Curbridge.

== Places of interest ==
=== Titchfield Abbey ===
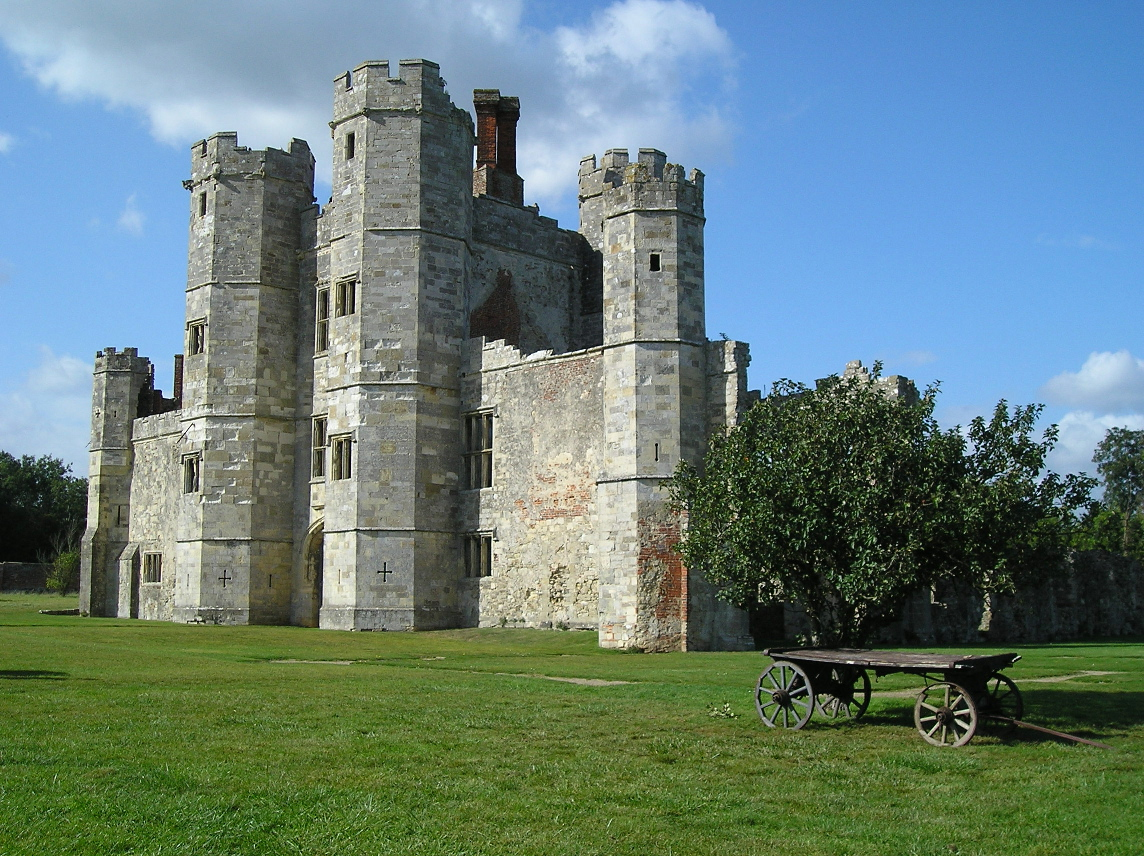
Titchfield Abbey in 2005

Premonstratensian canons founded Titchfield Abbey in 1222. Henry VIII dissolved the abbey in the 16th century, giving the property to a favoured politician, Thomas Wriothesley who turned it into "Place House" and took the title Earl of Southampton. Wriothesley's heirs, including the Duke of Portland and the Duke of Beaufort lived at Place House until 1742 at which point the estate was sold to the Delmé family. They lived there for another forty years until, in 1781, a decision was made to abandon the mansion.

Much of the buildings were deliberately demolished to create a romantic ruin. When this happened local people took stone from the abbey for their homes; evidence can be seen in walls and foundations of older houses in Titchfield village. Much, though, is inside the buildings; in The Bugle Hotel in Titchfield, for example, one can see a big fireplace that was salvaged from the ruins. The remains of Titchfield Abbey and Place House are now administered by English Heritage.

=== Titchfield Tithe Barn ===
Also known as Titchfield Abbey Barn is an aisled barn whose timbers date to 1408-09.

=== Office for National Statistics ===
Just outside Titchfield is one of the offices of the Office for National Statistics. The office is the national centre for population, regional and demographic statistics. It is one of three national statistical centres run by the Office for National Statistics.

=== Titchfield Common ===
Titchfield Common is a ward of Fareham Borough to the north and northwest of Titchfield itself.

== Events ==
The Titchfield Carnival took place in October every year from 1880 to 2006, organised by the Titchfield Bonfire Boys Society. By 2006 it was the largest village carnival in Hampshire. However, in 2007, due to the lack of funding and increasing costs, the carnival did not take place. The Titchfield Carnival returned in 2008 and it took place on Sunday 26 November 2008.

Entertainment also takes place within the ruins of the Abbey. On yearly occasions plays are performed in the Abbey: for example Midsummer Night's Dream by William Shakespeare has been performed.

== Notable people ==
Around 1636, Rachel Russell, English noblewoman, heiress, and author, was born as Lady Rachel Wriothesley, the second eldest daughter and co-heiress of Thomas Wriothesley, 4th Earl of Southampton, by his first wife, Rachel de Massue, daughter of Daniel de Massue, Seigneur de Rouvigny and Madeleine de Pinot des Fontaines.

- Richard Austin (1598–1645), early colonist of the United States
- Steve Claridge (born 1966), former footballer, now a pundit; grew up in the village
- Henry Timberlake (1570–1625), merchant adventurer, died in Titchfield

== See also ==
- List of places of worship in the Borough of Fareham
- Earl of Southampton Trust
