= Fothergill, Cumbria =

Hamlet in Cumbria, England

Coordinates: 54.694°N 3.516°W

Fothergill
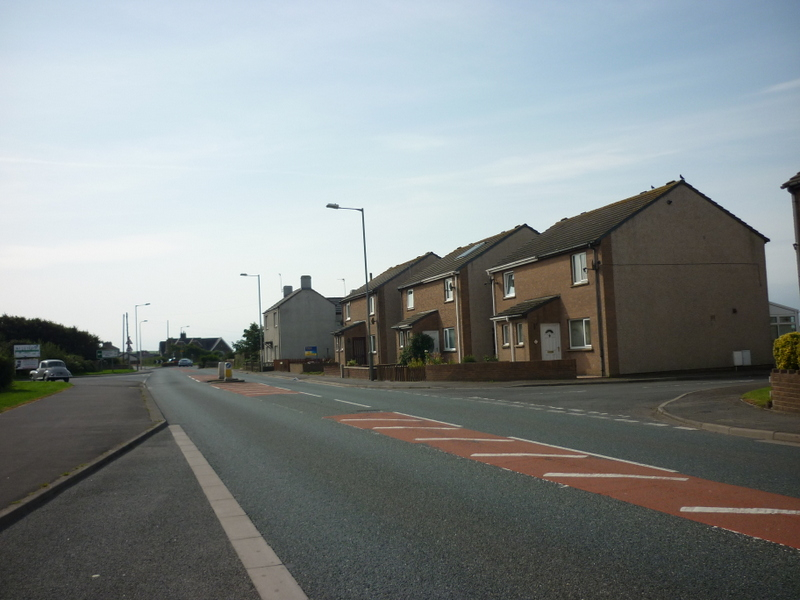
- Houses in Fothergill

- Location in Allerdale, Cumbria Location within Cumbria
- OS grid reference: NY023342
- Civil parish: Maryport
- Unitary authority: Cumberland
- Ceremonial county: Cumbria
- Region: North West
- Country: England
- Sovereign state: United Kingdom
- Post town: MARYPORT
- Postcode district: CA15
- Dialling code: 01900
- Police: Cumbria
- Fire: Cumbria
- Ambulance: North West
- UK Parliament: Penrith and Solway

Fothergill is a hamlet in Cumbria, England. There is a headland of the same name, Fothergill Head.
