= John Fothergill (engineer) =

British engineer and professor (born 1953)

John Fothergill (born in 1953 in Malta) is pro-vice-chancellor of City University London. He was head of engineering, dean of science and pro-vice-chancellor at the University of Leicester. He is a Fellow of the IEEE, the IEE, and the Institute of Physics.

He has over 120 refereed papers and over 20 postgraduate students.

== Early life and education ==

John Charles Fothergill was born in Malta. He lived in London and in Fish Hoek South Africa before moving to Iver Heath at the age of 10. He attended Slough Grammar School (now Upton Court Grammar School). He graduated from the University College of North Wales (now Bangor University) with a BSc (Hons) in Electronic Engineering (1975), an MSc in Electronic Materials and Devices (1976), and a PhD in the Dielectric Properties of Biopolymers (1980) which he studied with Profs Ron Pethig and John Lewis.

== Career ==
He worked at the Standard Telecommunication Laboratories from 1979 to 1984 as a senior research engineer on high-voltage power cables.

In 1984, he moved to the University of Leicester as a lecturer. He was promoted to professor in 2000 and was head of the Electrical Power and Power Electronics Research Group, dean of science, pro vice-chancellor (learning and teaching), and head of the department of engineering. He remains an honorary visiting professor at the University of Leicester.

In 2012, he became pro vice-chancellor (research and enterprise) at City University London.

He is a visiting professor at the Three Gorges University and Taiyuan University of Technology, China.
