= Stubbington =

Village and parish in Hampshire, England

Coordinates: 50.82560°N 1.21406°W

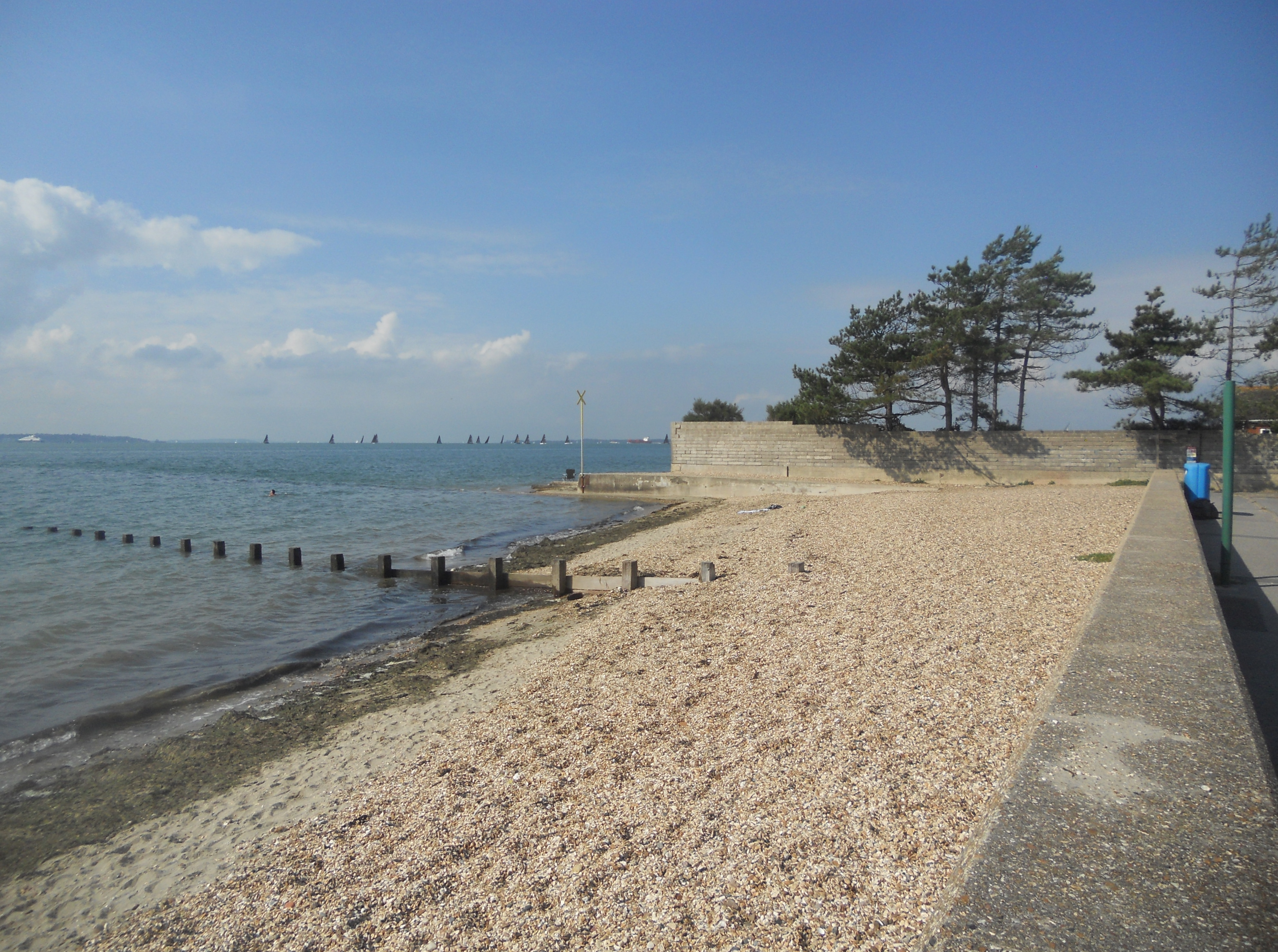
- Hill Head

- Location within Hampshire
- District: Fareham
- Shire county: Hampshire
- Region: South East
- Country: England
- Sovereign state: United Kingdom
- Post town: FAREHAM
- Postcode district: PO14
- Dialling code: 01329
- Police: Hampshire and Isle of Wight
- Fire: Hampshire and Isle of Wight
- Ambulance: South Central
- UK Parliament: Gosport

Stubbington is a village which is located between Southampton and Portsmouth, in the county of Hampshire on the south coast of England. It is within the borough of Fareham.

== History ==
Both Stubbington and neighbouring Crofton were mentioned in the Domesday Book (the 11th-century UK census) as small districts belonging to the estates of Titchfield Abbey.

The earliest known cricket match to have been played in Hampshire took place in the village in 1733.

During the 19th century, Stubbington engulfed Crofton and the small fishing village of Hill Head. The Crofton name still remains in the name of many local facilities, such as the Crofton School and Crofton Old Church.

At the start of the 20th century, the village still consisted of just a few dozen cottages and farms. By 1939, the population had risen to around 2,500, and a number of small shops had opened surrounding the village green. This remains the focus of the village to the present day, with a war memorial situated on the central village green.

== Places of worship ==
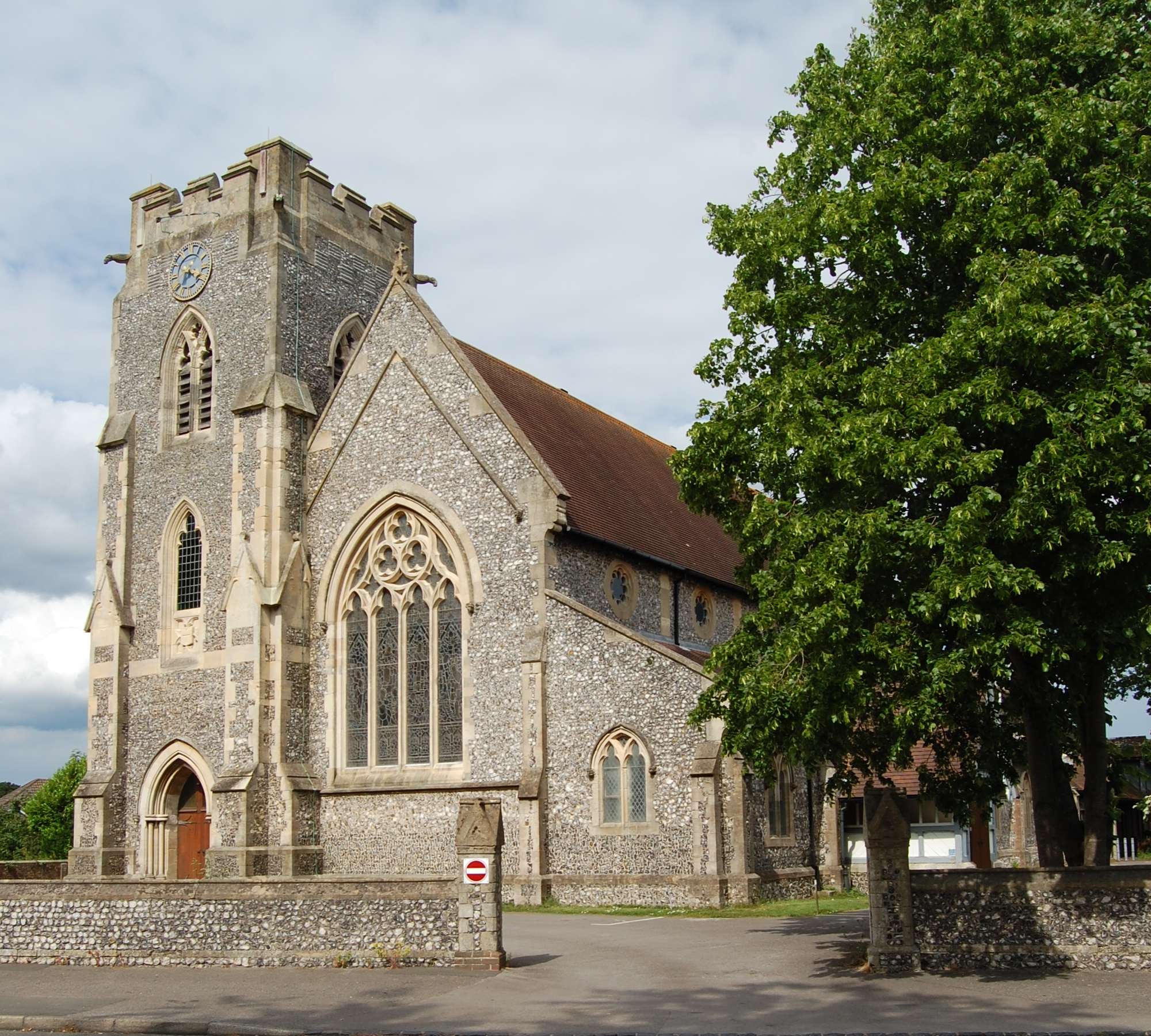
Holy Rood Church

A church at Crofton Old Church is mentioned in the Domesday Book of 1086, and some elements of the existing church are thought to date from the ninth or tenth century. It was previously Holy Rood, but was renamed St. Edmund's in 1878, and is also known as Crofton Old Church. Most of the current building is fourteenth century or later.

A new church (Holy Rood) was built in Stubbington in 1878, and took over the function of Crofton Church.

== The War Memorial and Village Pump ==
In 1922 a wooden War Memorial was built to commemorate those from Stubbington and Hill Head who were killed in the First World War. The Memorial takes the form of a shelter over the village pump, and today it is one of few pre-war structures standing in the vicinity of Stubbington Village Centre.

== Present day ==
According to the Office for National Statistics (ONS) Census 2021 the population of the Stubbington electoral ward was 7,224 on 21 March 2021. Fareham Borough Council identifies Stubbington and Hill Head as a single urban area and gives an earlier population estimate of approximately 14,300.

The village has a number of modern shops as well as a range of other facilities, including a doctor, dentist, library, community centre and seven schools. The former Royal Navy site of HMS Daedalus lies between Stubbington and neighbouring Lee-on-the-Solent, and a small part is currently being developed, however more is scheduled for further development that could further expand the village.

=== Neighbouring areas ===
The nearest village is Titchfield. Also near Stubbington is the area of Fareham called Hill Head and the town of Lee-on-the-Solent.

=== Schools ===
- Crofton Anne Dale Infant School
- Crofton Anne Dale Junior School
- Crofton Hammond Infant School
- Crofton Hammond Junior School
- Crofton School (Secondary Comprehensive)
- Meoncross School (private)

=== Study centre ===
The area has a study centre (Stubbington Study Centre) for children from local schools to learn about nature; it was originally opened in 1935, and has residential facilities.

== See also ==
- Crofton School
- List of places of worship in the Borough of Fareham
- Stubbington House School
