= John Fothergill (merchant) =

Merchant from Birmingham, England (1730–1782)

John Fothergill (1730–1782) was a merchant from Birmingham, England.

Fothergill was the manufacturer Matthew Boulton's business partner between 1762 and 1782. Fothergill's expertise was mainly in trading - he had served an apprenticeship in Königsberg, spoke French and German, and had travelled widely in Europe as an agent for other manufacturers. Together they opened the Soho Manufactory, one of the earliest factories in Birmingham. However, Boulton and Fothergill's partnership never made a profit, and the relationship ended in acrimony.
