= List of windmills in Hampshire and the Isle of Wight =

Extant windmills in Hampshire.
1 Bursledon, 2 Chalton, 3 Crux Easton, 4 Langstone.
Extant windmills in the Isle of Wight.
5 Bembridge.

A list of all windmills and windmill sites which lie in the current ceremonial counties of Hampshire and the Isle of Wight.

== Hampshire ==
Location	Name of mill and grid reference	Type	Maps	First mention or built	Last mention or demise	Photograph
Basingstoke	Pitt Hall Farm, Upper Wooton	Titt iron wind engine		1898		
Bentworth	Bentworth and Lasham railway station	Titt Iron wind engine		1901	1928	
Bitterne	Thornhill Park	Titt iron wind engine		1894		
Buckler's Hard		Tower				
Bursledon	Bursledon Windmill; SU 482 108	Post mill		1766	Demolished c. 1813	
Bursledon	Bursledon Windmill; SU 482 108	Tower		1813	Bursledon Windmill is Hampshire's only working windmill and is still open to the public today.	
Chalton	Chalton Mill; SU 716 162			1289	1289	
Chalton	Chalton Mill; SU 716 162	Sunk post	1607; 1611; 1645; 1675	1607	1675	
Chalton	Chalton Mill; SU 716 162	Tower		Early 19th century	Windmill World	
Cliddesden	Cliddesden railway station	Titt Iron wind engine		1901	Demolished 1940s	
Cosham	Widely Mill					
Crux Easton	Crux Easton wind engine SU 427 564	Titt Iron wind engine		c. 1891	Windmill World	
Denmead	Denmead Mill			1600	Demolished 19th century	
Denmead	New Denmead Mill					
Denmead	Barn Green Mill; Gale's Mill; SU 672 142	Tower		1819	Burnt 1900; Demolished 1922	
Dummer				1828		
Enham Alamein		Post			under construction Windmill World	
Fareham		Post	1759	1759	1759	
Fareham	Burrant Mill	Post	1759	1759	1759	
Fawley		Tower				
Froxfield	Tower			1828		
Gosport	Haslar mill				Demolished 1746	
Gosport	Crofton					
Gosport	Peel Common Mill	Tower				
Gosport	Ann's Hill Mill	Tower		1853	1854	
Grateley		Tower		1849	1889	
Haslar					Blown down 29 October 1795.	
Hayling		post		1325	1325	
Hayling		Tower			Burnt down 1890	
Hayling	North Hayling Mill; SU 719 028	Tower			Burnt down October 1886	
Hythe	Langdown Mill					
Langstone	Langstone Mill; SU 721 051	Tower		c. 1730	Windmill World	
Lymington						
Marchwood		Titt iron wind engine		1893		
Micheldever	Stratton Estate	Titt iron wind engine		1898		
Middle Wallop		Tower			Demolished late 18th or early 19th century, machinery to Idmiston Mill, Wiltshire	
Owslebury		Tower			Demolished during World War One	
Owlsebury	Bridle's mill	Tower				
Petersfield	Weston Mill	Smock			Demolished 1911	
Portchester		Tower			Standing 1908	
Portchester		Tower			Demolished c. 1920	
Portchester	Wicor Mill	Tower		1821		
Portsmouth	Dock Mill; Shipwright's Mill	Tower		1796	Demolished 1923	
Portsmouth	Portsmouth Harbour			14th century		
Portsmouth	Guildhall				Gone by 1800	
Portsmouth	Ballard's Mill	Tower			Demolished 1843	
Portsmouth	Rudmore Mill; Byerly Mill					
Portsmouth	Dwarf Mill; Lime Mill					
Portsmouth	Dennison's Mill					
Portsmouth	Mile End Mill					
Selborne						
Southampton				1530	1612	
Southampton				1600		
Southampton	Castle Mill					
Southampton	On road to Itchen Ferry			1600		
Southsea	Lump's Mill; White Mill	tower		1850	1870	
Stockbridge	Marsh Court	Titt iron wind engine		1900		
Titchfield	Peel Common Mill	Tower		18th century	Demolished 1920s.	
Titchfield	Titchfield Common Mill			18th century	Demolished 19th century	
Waterlooville	Hall's Mill	Smock			Burnt down 25 June 1906	
West Meon	Marland's Mill; SU 646 256	Tower		c. 1860	Windmill World	

== Isle of Wight ==
Location	Name of mill and grid reference	Type	Maps	First mention or built	Last mention or demise	Photograph
Bembridge	Knowle Mill; SZ 639 875	Tower		c. 1700	Windmill World	
Calbourne	Calbourne Mill; SZ 414 868			1980s	Windmill World	
Chale				1374	1374	
East Cowes				1759	Gone by 1846	
Freshwater				1292	1769	
Freshwater				1769	Burnt down 15 December 1824	
Freshwater		Tower		1863	1869	
Newchurch	Kington	Post		Early 17th century		
Ryde	Mill Fields	Tower				
Ryde	Aldemoor; Upton Mill	Tower			Demolished 1915	
Sandown	Cheverton Down	Post		Early 17th century		
Shalcombe		Post		Early 17th century		
Shanklin		Post		Early 17th century		
Cowes	Mill Hill Mill	Tower		1771	Demolished 1923	
Cowes	Kelleway Mill	Tower		1804	1853, demolished by 1862	

== Sources ==
Unless stated otherwise, the source for all entries is:

- Ellis, Monica, ed. (1978). Water and Wind Mills in Hampshire and the Isle of Wight. Southampton: Southampton University Industrial Archaeology Group. ISBN 0-905280-01-6.
- Triggs, Anthony (1982). The Windmills of Hampshire. Horndean: Milestone Publications. ISBN 0-903852-36-5.

=== Maps ===
- 1607 John Norden
- 1611 John Speed
- 1645 Joan Blaeu
- 1675 John Ogilby
- 1759 Isaac Taylor

== Notes ==
Mills in bold are still standing, and known building dates are also indicated in bold. Text in italics denotes indicates that the information is not confirmed, but is likely to be the case stated.
