= Joshua Spencer-Smith =

English cricketer

Personal information
- Full name: Gilbert Joshua Spencer-Smith
- Born: 17 December 1843; Sarisbury, Hampshire, England
- Died: 4 February 1928 (aged 84); Bursledon, Hampshire, England
- Batting: Right-handed
- Bowling: Right-arm roundarm slow
- Relatives: Orlando Spencer-Smith (twin brother); Cunliffe Gosling (nephew); Henry Wilder (uncle)

Domestic team information
- Years: Team
- 1864: Hampshire

Career statistics
| Competition | First-class |
|---|---|
| Matches | 1 |
| Runs scored | 20 |
| Batting average | 10.00 |
| 100s/50s | –/– |
| Top score | 11 |
| Catches/stumpings | –/– |
- Source: Cricinfo, 13 December 2009

Gilbert Joshua Spencer-Smith JP (17 December 1843 – 2 February 1928) was an English first-class cricketer and British Army officer.

Spencer-Smith was born at Brooklands, the Spencer-Smith family home in December 1843; he was a twin, born alongside Orlando Spencer-Smith. His parents were Spencer Smith and Frances Anne Seymour. He was educated at Eton College, where he played for the college cricket team which was captained by Mike Mitchell. After completing his education, Spencer-Smith chose to pursue a career in the British Army and purchased the commission of ensign in the 25th Foot in March 1863. He played first-class cricket for Hampshire in their first season as a first-class county in 1864, making one appearance against Sussex at Hove. Opening the batting in both Hampshire innings, he was dismissed twice by James Lillywhite for scores of 11 and 9. He was described by Wisden as "a good slow round-armed bowler, and quick at short slip."

In October 1865, he purchased the rank of lieutenant while serving in the 85th Foot, before purchasing the rank of captain in October 1871. He retired from active service in January 1876, while retaining the rank of captain, but returned to service with the Royal Hampshire Regiment in April 1877. He later retired his commission with the Royal Hampshire Regiment in April 1886 and was granted the honorary rank of major. A justice of the peace for Hampshire, Spencer-Smith died at Bursledon in February 1928. His twin brother was also a first-class cricket, as were his nephew Cunliffe Gosling and uncle Henry Wilder.
