= Orlando Spencer-Smith =

English cricketer

Personal information
- Full name: Orlando Spencer-Smith
- Born: 17 December 1843; Sarisbury, Hampshire, England
- Died: 23 November 1920 (aged 76); Swanwick, Hampshire, England
- Batting: Right-handed
- Bowling: Right-arm roundarm slow
- Relatives: Joshua Spencer-Smith (twin brother); Cunliffe Gosling (nephew); Henry Wilder (uncle)

Domestic team information
- Years: Team
- 1866: Oxford University
- 1866: Hampshire

Career statistics
| Competition | First-class |
|---|---|
| Matches | 7 |
| Runs scored | 354 |
| Batting average | 35.40 |
| 100s/50s | –/2 |
| Top score | 98 |
| Balls bowled | 329 |
| Wickets | 3 |
| Bowling average | 43.33 |
| 5 wickets in innings | – |
| 10 wickets in match | – |
| Best bowling | 2/53 |
| Catches/stumpings | –/– |
- Source: Cricinfo, 24 December 2009

Orlando Spencer-Smith JP (17 December 1843 – 23 November 1920) was an English first-class cricketer and clergyman.

Spencer-Smith was born at Brooklands, the Spencer-Smith family home in December 1843; he was a twin, born alongside Joshua Spencer-Smith. His parents were Spencer Smith and Frances Anne Seymour. He was educated at Eton College, where he played for the college cricket team which was captained by Mike Mitchell. From Eton he went up to Oriel College, Oxford. While studying at Oxford, Spencer-Smith played first-class cricket for Oxford University Cricket Club in 1866, making six appearances, including in that years University Match against Cambridge University at Lord's which obtained him his blue. In his six matches for Oxford, he scored 301 runs at an average of 37.62 and a highest score of 98, made against Southgate. With his roundarm slow bowling, he took 3 wickets. In the same year that he played for Oxford, Spencer-Smith also made a single appearance for Hampshire against the Marylebone Cricket Club at Southampton, top-scoring in Hampshire's second innings with 39.

After graduating from Oxford, Spencer-Smith was ordained into the Church of England. He was curate at Thornford in Dorset from 1871 to 1874, before being appointed vicar at Kingston on Soar in Nottinghamshire from 1875 to 1878, before returning to Dorset where he was rector at Swyre from 1878 to 1888. A justice of the peace, Spencer-Smith died at Swanwick in November 1920. His twin brother was also a first-class cricket, as were his nephew Cunliffe Gosling and uncle Henry Wilder.
