= Bursledon railway station =

Railway station in Hampshire, England

Coordinates: 50.884°N 1.305°W

Bursledon
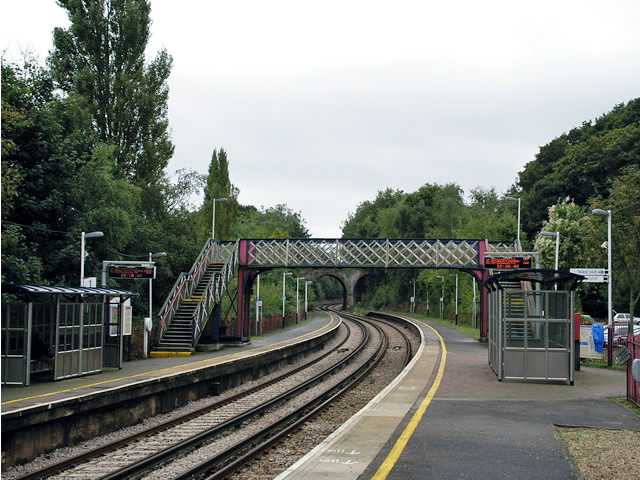

General information
- Location: Bursledon, Eastleigh; England
- Grid reference: SU490096
- Managed by: South Western Railway
- Platforms: 2

Other information
- Station code: BUO
- Classification: DfT category F2

History
- Opened: 2 September 1889
- Original company: London and South Western Railway
- Pre-grouping: London and South Western Railway
- Post-grouping: Southern Railway

Passengers
- 2020/21: ▼16,768
- 2021/22: ▲47,822
- 2022/23: ▲54,750
- 2023/24: ▲58,546
- 2024/25: ▲68,028
Location
Notes
- Passenger statistics from the Office of Rail and Road

Bursledon railway station serves the village of Bursledon in Hampshire, England. It is on the West Coastway Line. The station is operated by South Western Railway, who provide all trains serving it.

The station itself is located near a quay side on the River Hamble, where a number of yachts are moored, alongside a local pub, The Jolly Sailor. The M27 crosses the water near the station. The train station has many local walks nearby, with access to Hamble via the Strawberry Trail.

== Services ==
All services at Bursledon are operated by South Western Railway using Class 450 EMUs.

The typical off-peak service is one train per hour in each direction between Portsmouth & Southsea and Southampton Central. Additional services call at the station during the peak hours.

Preceding station	National Rail	Following station
Swanwick	South Western Railway West Coastway Line	Hamble
