= Justinian Nutt =

Royal Navy officer (1704-1757)

Captain Justinian Nutt
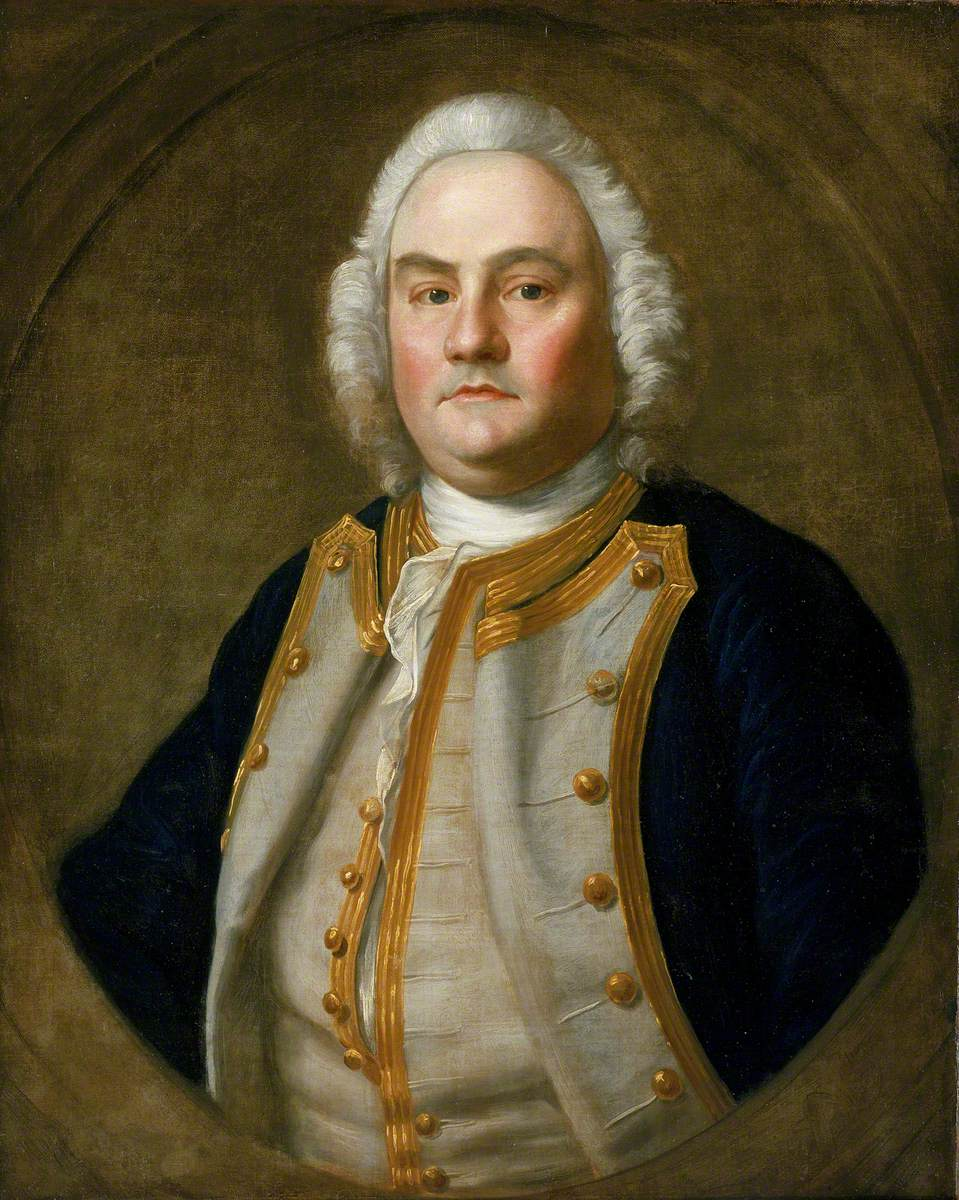
- Portrait of Nutt c.1750
- Born: c.1704
- Died: 11 December 1757; Royal Naval Hospital, Greenwich
- Spouse: Elizabeth Cooke (m. 1749)
- Military career
- Allegiance: Great Britain
- Branch: Royal Navy
- Service years: 1728–1754
- Rank: Captain
- Commands: HMS Tavistock; HMS Grand Turk; HMS Prince Edward; HMS Edinburgh; HMS Tavistock; HMS Anson
- Conflicts: War of the Austrian Succession; George Anson's voyage around the world

Captain Justinian Nutt (c.1704 – 11 December 1757) was a Royal Navy officer. He joined the navy as a captain's servant and spent the first twelve years of his career as a rating. In 1740 he embarked on George Anson's voyage around the world in HMS Centurion, becoming the ship's master. As chief navigator for the expedition Nutt made several errors in the passage around Cape Horn, causing hundreds of seamen to die from scurvy and other ailments. When Centurion captured the Manila galleon Nuestra Señora de Covadonga off the Philippines in 1743, Nutt was promoted to lieutenant and catalogued the treasure in the ship.

Nutt was promoted to commander and then captain in 1745, commanding HMS Tavistock and HMS Grand Turk in the English Channel and a different HMS Tavistock in the Bay of Biscay. His last command was HMS Anson, the guardship at Portsmouth, from 1748 to 1752, during which time he sat on several courts-martial. Nutt retired in 1754 to become a captain of the Royal Naval Hospital, Greenwich, where he died in 1757.

== Military career ==
=== Early service ===
Justinian Nutt was born c. 1704. He joined the Royal Navy on 4 December 1728, becoming a captain's servant on board the 20-gun frigate HMS Bideford. He was promoted to able seaman on 3 August 1731, continuing as such until 18 November 1734 when he was advanced to become Bideford's ship's corporal. On 18 March 1736 Bideford was sailing out of Bridlington Bay, Yorkshire, when it was found that water was coming up through the hold. The flooding continued, extinguishing the galley fire, and the captain ordered Bideford run ashore at Steel Point, near Flamborough Head. The crew evacuated the ship, which was lost. After this Nutt was left without employment for two years until 12 July 1738 when he was appointed a master's mate of the 60-gun ship of the line HMS York.

=== Voyage around the world ===
With the War of the Austrian Succession having begun, in 1740 Nutt moved from York to join the 60-gun ship of the line HMS Centurion for George Anson's voyage around the world, intended to attack major settlements in Spanish America. Having initially served only as a lieutenant's servant, Nutt rose to become Centurion's master and chief navigator for the squadron. He made several errors during the outward leg of the voyage, miscalculating their route to Patagonia by 300 miles (480 km) and directing Centurion the wrong way along the Chilean coast, with 100 men dying to scurvy as the ship rectified the mistake.

On 14 April Centurion and the other ships in Anson's squadron were attempting to round Cape Horn from the Atlantic Ocean when it was found that they were unexpectedly close to land and had to urgently turn out to sea to avoid shipwreck. The ships were forced to reverse their tracks to make a new course to safely clear Tierra del Fuego.

In making the next attempt to round the Horn illness was rife, and Centurion lost forty-three men in April and around double that in May. The ship reached Guamblin Island, the squadron rendezvous point, on 8 May. The crew continued to suffer, and when on 22 May Centurion was hit by a storm that threatened to sink the vessel, Nutt was left on the helm with only Richard Walter, the ship's chaplain, for support. Nutt was officially promoted to master on 9 June.

The capture of Nuestra Señora de Covadonga on 20 June 1743

Having completed a perilous crossing of the Pacific Ocean, Centurion refitted at Macao. Of the 500 men who had originally sailed in the ship, 400 had died. Centurion was the only ship of the squadron remaining, three having been lost rounding Cape Horn and three more having been scuttled in the Pacific. Having failed to make a noticeable impact in attacks on Spanish America, Anson decided to make one final attempt before returning to Britain. It was learned that the Spanish usually sent the Manila galleon from Mexico to the Philippines in the month of June, and Anson determined to capture it. Centurion departed Macao on 19 April and sailed for the islands.

Centurion reached the Philippines in May and spent the following month training her guns and searching for the valuable ship around her expected route off Samar. On 20 June the galleon Nuestra Señora de Covadonga was sighted. At 1pm Centurion crossed Covadonga's bow and began firing into the Spanish treasure ship. After ninety minutes of fighting Covadonga surrendered. The ship's cargo was 1,313,843 pieces of eight and 35,682 ounces (1,011,600 g) of silver, including 256 chests of coins, one of the richest cargoes ever captured by a British warship.

Nutt was promoted to acting lieutenant on 21 June and sent to form part of Covadonga's prize crew as her first lieutenant. He was tasked with cataloguing the captured treasure as it was sent across to Centurion, estimated to be worth £400,000, equivalent to £83,178,271 in 2025. He transferred back to Centurion as her third lieutenant on 17 November. Having made another journey to Macao where they sold Covadonga to the Portuguese, Centurion left the Canton River on 15 December to return to Britain. Sailing undetected through a fog in the English Channel, Centurion avoided a French squadron and arrived at Spithead on 15 June 1744. Of the 1,900 men who had sailed on the expedition only 188 remained. Nutt subsequently provided navigational notes to Walter for his official account of the expedition, A Voyage Round the World in the Years 1740, 1, 2, 3, 4, which was published in 1748 and became very popular, being reprinted four times in the first year.

=== Command ===
Having been confirmed as a lieutenant by the Admiralty on 31 August, Nutt became first lieutenant of the 90-gun ship of the line HMS Prince George on 18 January 1745. He stayed in post only briefly, being promoted to commander on 27 February. Given command of the 10-gun sloop HMS Tavistock, he commanded her in the English Channel until 12 August when he was promoted again, becoming captain of the 22-gun frigate HMS Grand Turk. This was a recently captured French privateer from Saint-Malo which he also command in the Channel, based out of Portsmouth.

Nutt transferred from Grand Turk to command the 44-gun frigate HMS Prince Edward on 2 July 1746, and then moved again on 7 March 1747, becoming captain of the 64-gun ship of the line HMS Edinburgh. Continuing a pattern of quickly moving through commands, Nutt was translated into the 50-gun ship of the line HMS Tavistock on 19 August the same year. In this ship Nutt served as part of the Western Squadron in the Bay of Biscay, under the command of first Vice-Admiral Sir Peter Warren and then Rear-Admiral Edward Hawke. Tavistock served in a squadron based off Lisbon which unsuccessfully patrolled for Spanish ships.

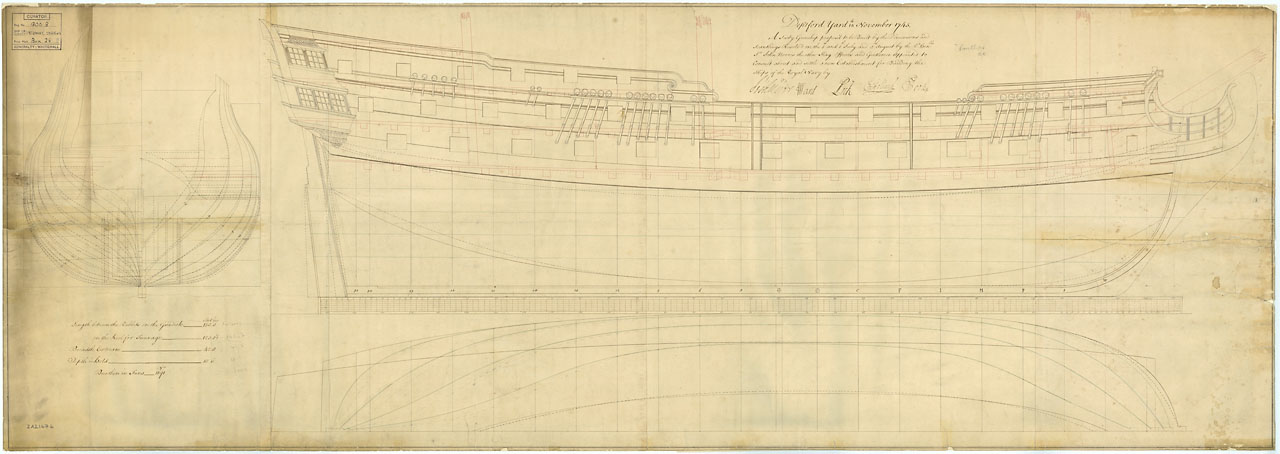
HMS Anson was Nutt's last command

Nutt was given command of the 60-gun ship of the line HMS Anson, the guard ship at Portsmouth, on 23 September 1748. He had been expected to command Centurion but instead acceded to Anson, now an admiral, who asked that he allow Commodore Augustus Keppel, another expedition veteran, to use the ship as his flagship in the Mediterranean Fleet. At Portsmouth Nutt participated in several court-martials. On 5 December he sat on the board investigating the wreck of the 44-gun frigate HMS Fowey, and he was one of the captains in June 1749 who formed the court-martial regarding the 44-gun frigate HMS Chesterfield, after the officers mutinied and took control of the ship. Nutt continued in Anson until the ship was paid off on 17 November 1752. Anson was Nutt's last command in the Royal Navy.

Nutt retired from the navy in 1754 to become a captain of the Royal Naval Hospital, Greenwich. He died at Greenwich on 11 December 1757, serving at the time as the third of four captains there.

== Personal life ==
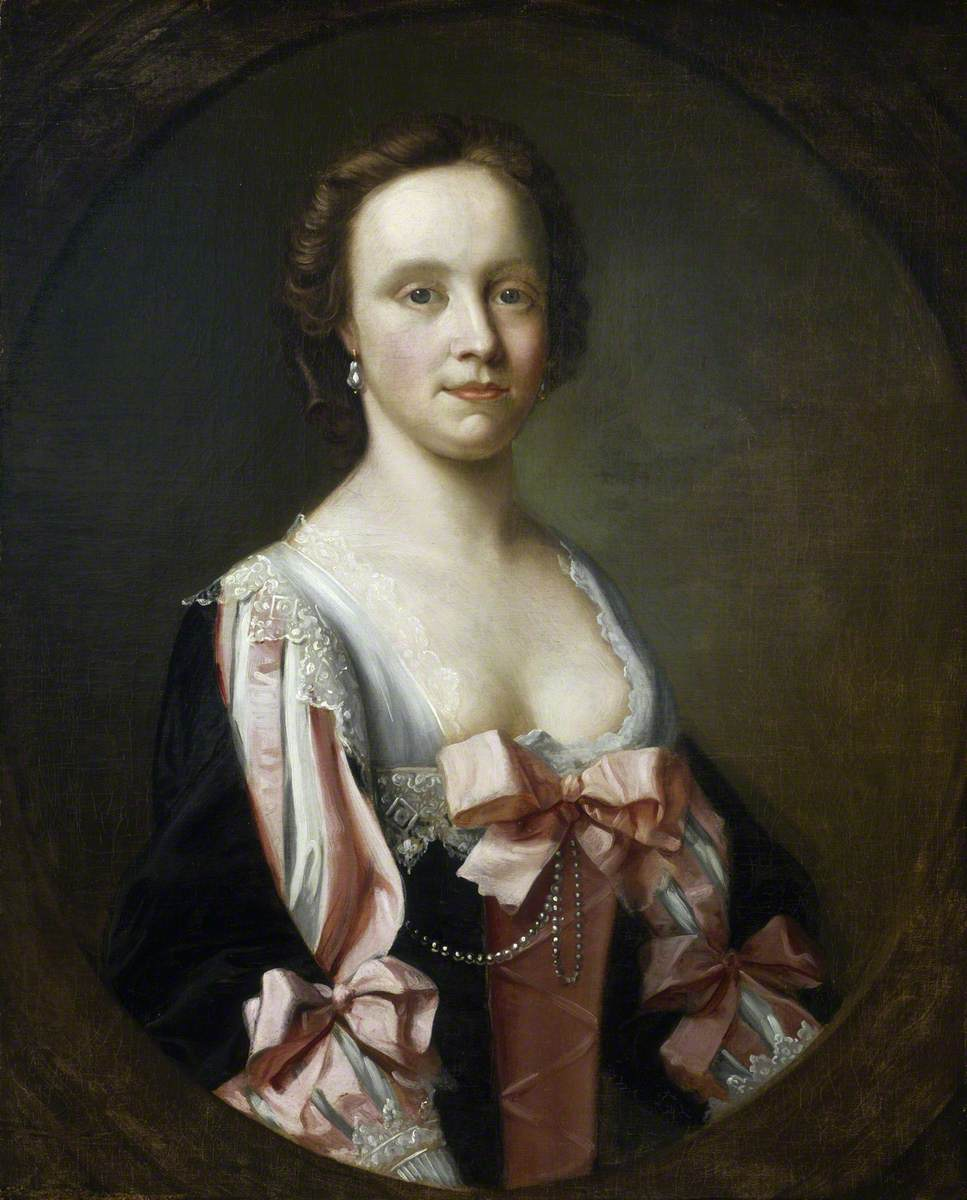
Elizabeth née Cooke, Mrs Justinian Nutt

Nutt married Elizabeth Cooke (born 1726) on 8 August 1749. The wedding took place in Wickham, Hampshire, and was led by Thomas Cheyney. From Winchester, Cooke came with a dowry of £10,000, equivalent to £1,907,495 in 2025. After Nutt's death she married Charles Besson, one of the lieutenants at Greenwich. Nutt and Cooke had two children:

- George Anson Nutt (25 May 1750 – c.1793)
- Justinian Saunders Bentley Nutt (14 August 1754 – 1811), an East India Company sea officer.
