= HMS Tavistock (1745) =

Royal Navy ship

HMS Tavistock (renamed HMS Albany in 1747) was a 10-gun Royal Navy ship launched in 1745 which, despite her small size, made a disproportionate impact on navy activity of the time. She had several notable commanders during her service.

== History ==
She was ordered in May 1744 and built at Gosport Docks to a design by Jacob Ackworth and cost of only £2000. She was launched March 1745 under command of Justinian Nutt and sailed to Portsmouth for fitting out and armament at cost of a further £2000.

Under Commander George MacKenzie she was used in the Lorient Operation - part of the War of Austrian Succession. On 1 October 1746 she was part of the sinking of the 64-gun French ship L'Ardent (a major coup).

At the time of her renaming to HMS Albany, she was under command of Gilbert Young. Renaming was brought about by the loss of HMS Albany (1745), which had been captured by the French. The name "Tavistock" continued with HMS Tavistock (1747). Young took her back to England for upgrading of her armament: becoming a 14-gun ship (plus 14 smaller swivel guns).

She was recommissioned March 1748 under command of Captain John Rous who took her over the Atlantic to Nova Scotia. On 16 October 1750, as part of Father Le Loutre's War, he attacked two French vessels off Cape Sable: the "Sainte Francois" under Captain Vergor, and the supply ship "Aimable Jeanne". Vergor's ship was severely damaged but Aimable Jeanne escaped and reached Fort Boishebert. Rous lost three crew.

Then Rous sailed her back to England for further refitting at Woolwich. She then spent an extended period between Woolwich and Deptford, undergoing works before finally going back into active service in 1755 when she was stationed at Dublin under Commander William Langdon, but had to undergo yet more repairs at Deptford, costing £3000. She then was in service around the coast of Britain for several years.

In June 1756 command transferred to Edmund Affleck before being offered to John Elliot in March 1757. Elliott declined the commission, having an eye on more prestigious postings. His decision was rewarded three months later, with an appointment to command the 26-gun HMS Hussar. In his absence, command of Albany went to Charles Medows in April 1757.

After several commanders, not until March 1761 did she start to see military action again, by then under command of William Brograve. This included capture of the privateer Le Hazard near Cherbourg in March, the 14-gun La Tourterelle from Caen in April, and the capture of the 14-gun French corvette Le Faisan a few days later. The latter was taken to Spithead and later recommissioned under the name HMS Pheasant.

In February 1762 command moved to Thomas Symonds and finally to Thomas Pasley before the ship was paid off the Navy lists in January 1763. She was sold privately at Woolwich for £635 (stripped of her guns) and presumably was used for trading. Her final fate is not known.

== Bibliography ==
- McLeod, Anne Byrne (2010). The Mid-Eighteenth Century Navy from the Perspective of Captain Thomas Burnett and His Peers (Thesis). University of Exeter. OCLC 757128667.
