= Philemon Ewer =

English shipbuilder

There were a number of shipbuilders and shipwrights called Philemon Ewer in the villages of Bursledon and Hamble in the River Hamble area of Hampshire, England during the 18th century.

== The Master Shipbuilder ==
The 'Master' shipbuilder was Philemon Ewer (19 July 1702 – 13 December 1750). He was a timber merchant and builder of small boats but gained an opportunity through the outbreak of the 'War of Jenkins' Ear' to build Men of War for the British government in 1739.

He also had a shipyard in East Cowes on the Isle of Wight.

He was buried at St Leonards in Bursledon on 16 December 1750 and has an elaborate memorial which records:

In Memory of MR PHILEMON EWER, who died the 13th day of December A.D. 1750 aged 49 Years. During the late war with France & Spain He build Seven large Ships of war for His Majesty's Service. In the Execution of that important Trust He gained, and deserved, the Reputation of an ingenious Artist and excellent workman and an honest Man. All his Undertakings were crowned with Success, And all his Industry justly rewarded With a fair Character & a plentiful Fortune; The first of which he left for ye Imitation The second for the Support & Enjoyment Of his numerous Family; who in Gratitude erected This Monument A:D: 1754

His seven ships were:

Ship	Type	Armament	Launched	Shipyard	Notes
HMS Falkland	Fourth Rate	48-gun	1744	Bursledon	This was a rebuild of the first ever ship built in North America in 1696
HMS Lizard	Sloop	14-gun	1744	Bursledon
HMS Ruby	Fourth Rate	50-gun	1745	Bursledon
HMS Salisbury	Fourth Rate	44-gun	1746	East Cowes	James Lind carried out his famous experiments on scurvy on this ship in 1747
HMS Fox	Sixth Rate	24-gun	1746	Bursledon
HMS Anson	Fourth Rate	60-gun	1747	Bursledon
HMS Vanguard	Third Rate	70-gun	1748	East Cowes	Took part in the captures of Louisbourg, Quebec and Martinique

He also built a large house in the village from the proceeds. It was called 'Elm Lodge' at the time but is now known as 'Greyladyes' and is home to the 'Greyladyes Arts Foundation' Google Maps Link.

There is also an 18th-century house called 'Ewers' on Lands End Road in Bursledon that was owned by the family. Google Maps link

== Other Philemon Ewers ==
- The Master Shipbuilder's father (died 1730) Built trading ships mainly at Hamble
- The Master Shipbuilder's son (1735 - 1797) Seems to have been known as 'Captain' (most likely due to his position in the local militia) and lived at 'Elm Lodge' in Bursledon Google Maps Link- He does appear to have continued building smaller ships for the navy up to at least 1757 and left provision for his eldest son to be placed under an eminent shipwright in his will
- The Master Shipbuilder's nephew (1726 - 1792) Lived at 'Upcott House' in Bursledon Google Maps Link - Owned sloops for trading purposes and was also a maltster and timber merchant. He is recorded as offering to build ships for the navy.
- Both the Master shipbuilder's son and nephew had a son together named Philemon.
