= Langstone, Hampshire =

Village in Hampshire, England

Coordinates: 50°50.349′N 0°58.859′W

Langstone
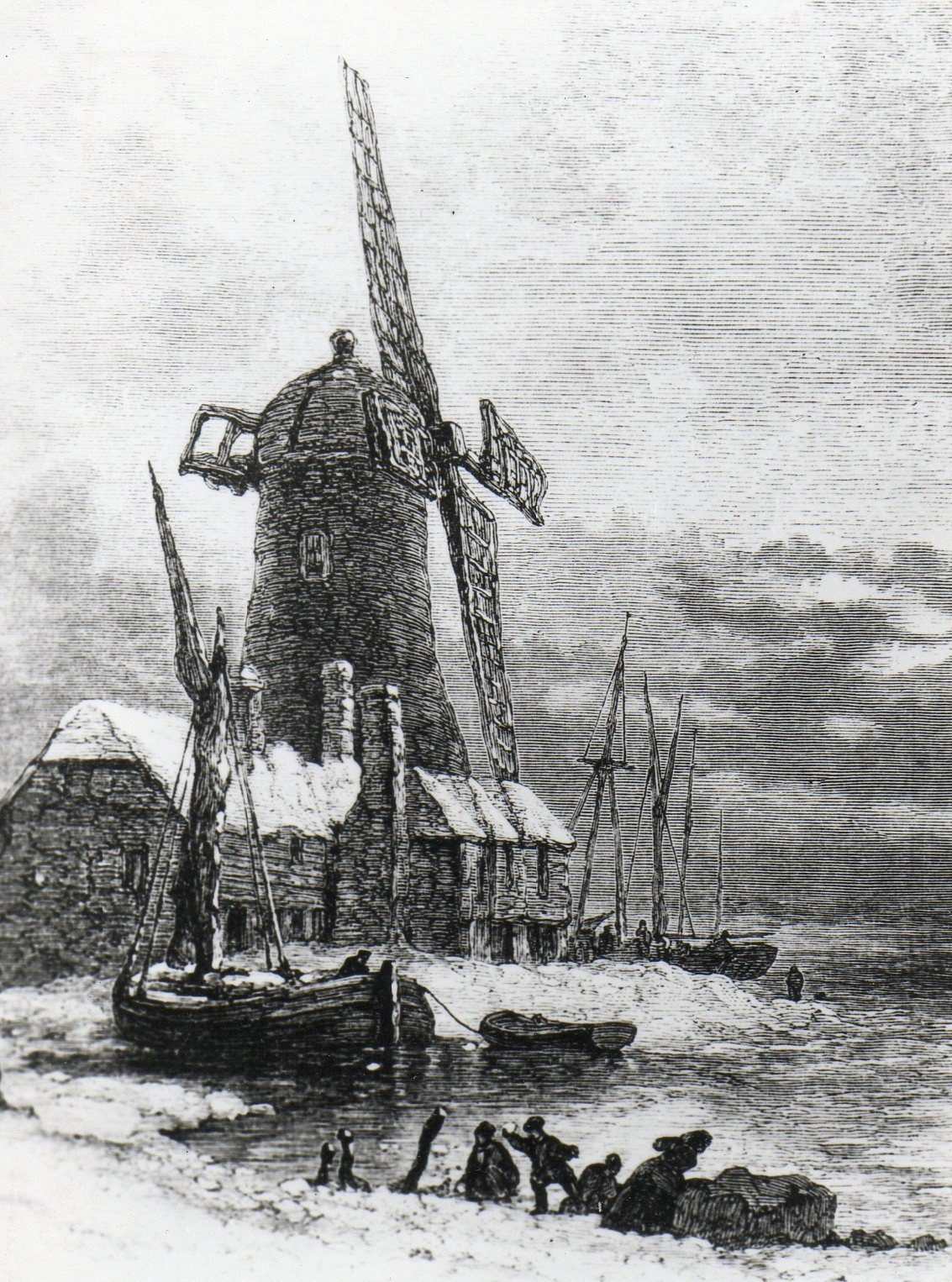
- Langstone Windmill in 1869

- Location within Hampshire
- District: Havant
- Shire county: Hampshire
- Region: South East
- Country: England
- Sovereign state: United Kingdom
- Post town: Havant
- Postcode district: PO9
- Police: Hampshire and Isle of Wight
- Fire: Hampshire and Isle of Wight
- Ambulance: South Central
- UK Parliament: Havant

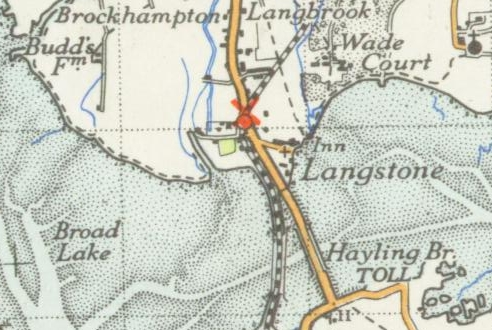
A map of Langstone and surrounding areas from 1945

Langstone is a village near Havant, Hampshire in the south east of England in Portsmouth. It has good railway connections to London, Southampton, Portsmouth and Brighton, from the nearby Havant railway station. There are many large gated detached houses on the main road, "Langstone Road" and on the roads surrounding this. It has a sailing club, several architecturally unusual buildings, and several historically significant buildings, including a converted (water) millhouse and a converted 18th century windmill, the latter of which is a local landmark.

== Geography ==
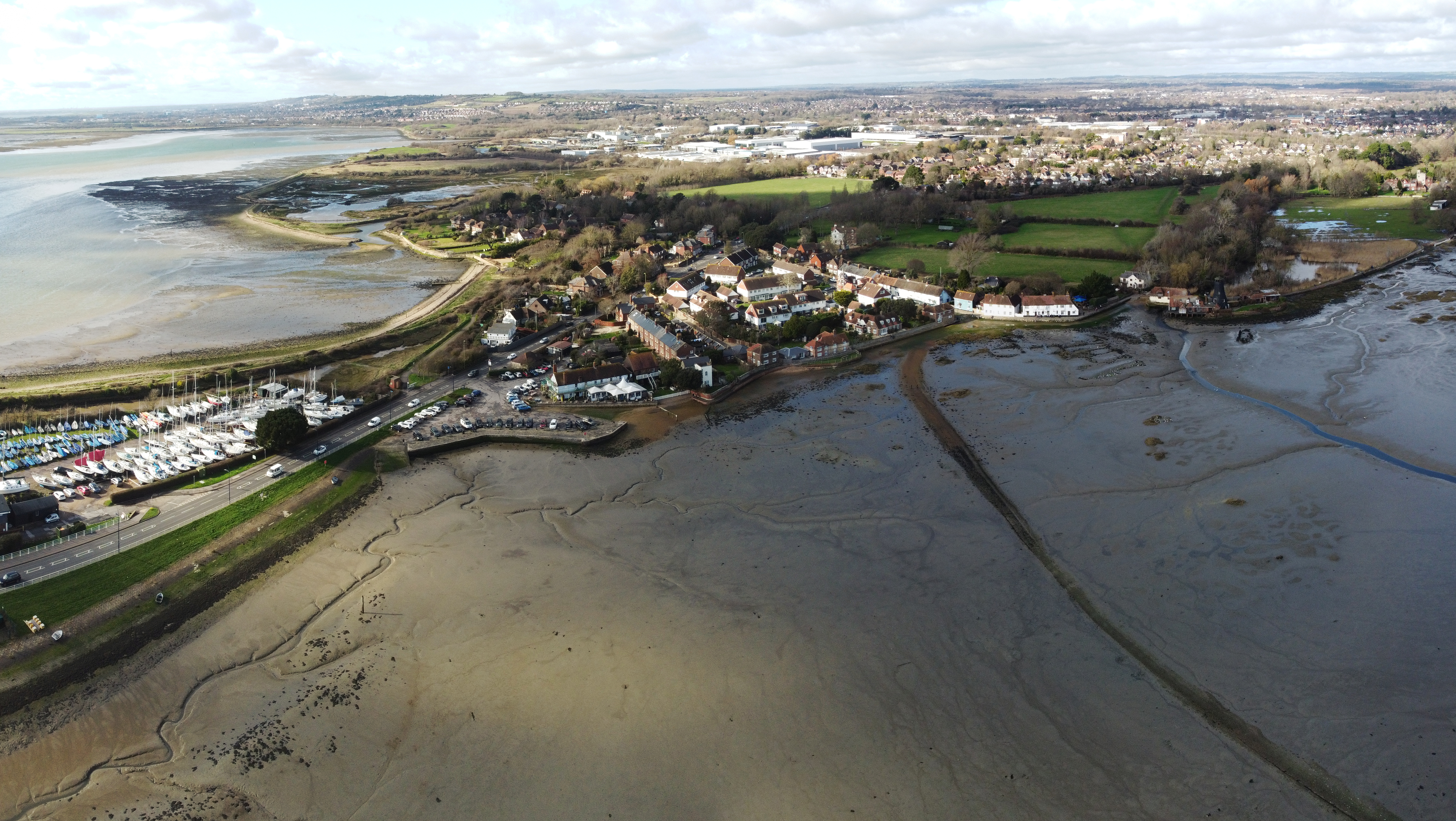
Panorama view of Langstone

The village surrounds "Langstone Road" which leads to Hayling Island. There is a technology park on Langstone Road and this is due to the connections of the road. It lies just off the A27 that provides quick links to Portsmouth, Southampton and Brighton. The A3(M) to London is also nearby and the distance to the M25 is about 45 miles.

It is connected by Langstone Bridge, a single-carriageway road and footbridge, to Hayling Island to the South; this road (the A3023) is the only road connection from Hayling Island to the mainland. To the west of the road bridge the remains of the former railway bridge are visible; Langstone Harbour lies to the west of the railway bridge, Chichester Harbour to the east.

The historic causeway to Hayling Island known as the Wadeway still exists, however it is now completely impassable, having been cut in two by a deep channel for the Portsmouth and Chichester Canal in the 1820s, the same company having subsequently funded the old wooden road bridge, served by a toll-house situated at the northern end. There was a weight-limit and after WW2 only single-decker buses were allowed across and if they were carrying too many passengers some had to get out and walk, regardless of the weather, to reduce axle-weight. The old wooden bridge was demolished following construction of the current (2014) concrete bridge in the late 1950s. The much earlier causeway was known as the Wade Way, and was classified as a bridleway in 1988, and is shown as such on modern Ordnance Survey maps in spite of its use being considered hazardous at best. Excavation of this feature in 2006, constructed on a natural high point in the harbour, put its date in the Roman to mediaeval range but found no evidence to be more specific.

The village High Street is designated as a Conservation Area (denoted by a blue plaque at the sea-end of the High Street), while the coastal path leading eastwards from the village is both part of Hampshire County Council's Solent Way and the same Councils' Wayfarers Walk.

Thorney Island and Portsea Island are also both clearly visible from the village coast.

=== Pubs In Langstone ===
There are two Grade II listed pubs in Langstone:

- The Royal Oak
- The Ship Inn

== Architecture ==
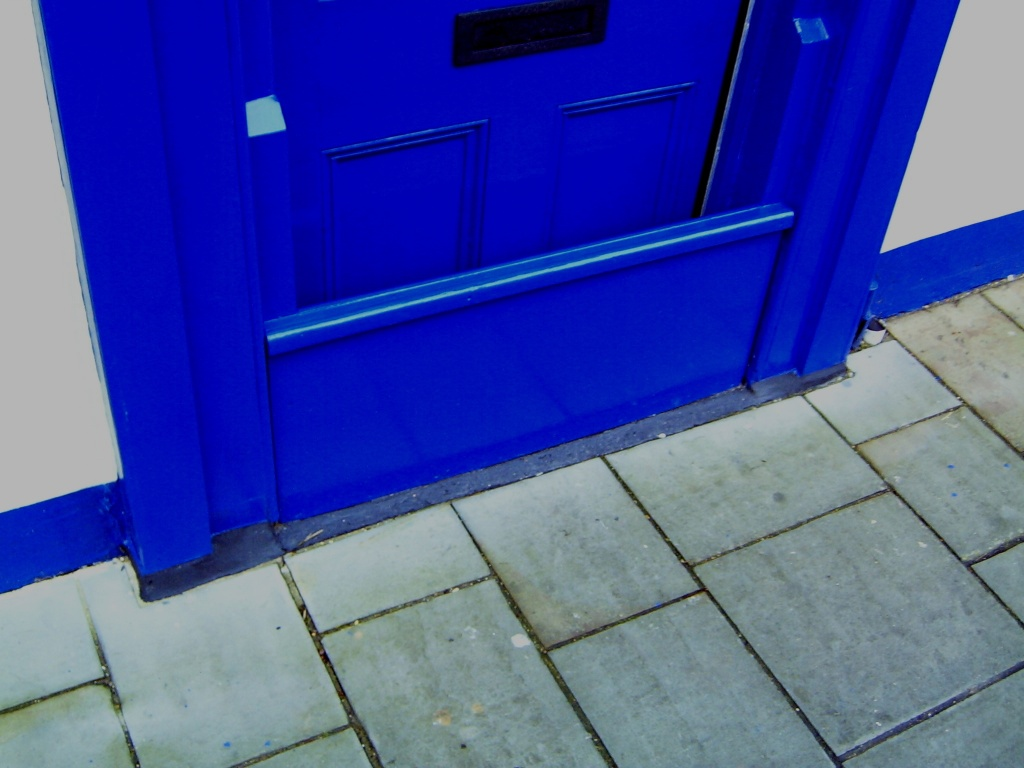
The flood defences on one building in Langstone

Flooding can be a problem in the village, on occasion with water right up to the main Langstone Road, and many buildings on Langstone High Street have slots for wooden barriers on their door frames, and stack up sandbags. However flood risk to buildings is strictly limited to the older (pre-twentieth century) properties.

Houses in the terrace on Langstone High Street date back to the 18th century and a number are thatched. The other significant buildings, commonly featured in local postcards, is Langstone Towers, characterised by a large lightning conductor.

== History ==
The village used to have rail links with Hayling Island and Havant in the form of the Hayling Billy railway, however the lines have since been torn up and the route replaced with a cycle and bridlepath. The remains of the Hayling Billy rail bridge over to Hayling Island can still be seen.

== Etymology ==
The name Langstone comes from Lang (compare the High German "lang") meaning "Long", and Stone with the same current-day usage.

== Notable people ==
- Nevil Shute Norway, engineer and novelist, lived at the old mill owned by his friend the artist Flora Twort in 1939 prior to moving on to Hayling Island.
- Flora Twort the artist owned the old mill at Langstone.
