= Hamble railway station =

Railway station in Hampshire, England

Coordinates: 50.871°N 1.329°W

Hamble
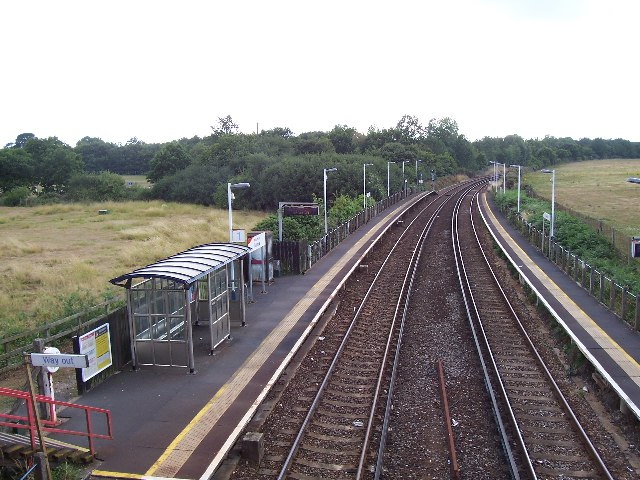

General information
- Location: Hamble-le-Rice, Eastleigh; England
- Grid reference: SU473081
- Managed by: South Western Railway
- Platforms: 2

Other information
- Station code: HME
- Classification: DfT category F2

History
- Opened: 18 January 1942
- Original company: Southern Railway

Passengers
- 2020/21: ▼39,496
- 2021/22: ▲72,282
- 2022/23: ▲80,268
- 2023/24: ▼76,424
- 2024/25: ▲89,658
Location
Notes
- Passenger statistics from the Office of Rail and Road

Hamble railway station is an unstaffed station near the village of Hamble-le-Rice, England. It is served by a 2-track electrified line which joins the Southampton to London main line, in the direction of Southampton at St Denys in Southampton, and joins the line running east from Eastleigh at Fareham.

The station is adjacent to a bridge carrying Hamble Lane and also in close proximity to The Hamble School, the local secondary school. Bus stops serving the station are just to the north on Hamble Lane. Shelters are provided.

Just west of the station platforms is a disused but largely complete branch line running down into the Hamble-le-Rice oil terminal.

== Services ==
All services at Hamble are operated by South Western Railway using Class 450 EMUs.

The typical off-peak service is one train per hour in each direction between Portsmouth & Southsea and Southampton Central. Additional services call at the station during the peak hours.

Preceding station	National Rail	Following station
Bursledon	South Western Railway West Coastway Line	Netley
