= HMS Falkland (1696) =

Ship of the line of the Royal Navy

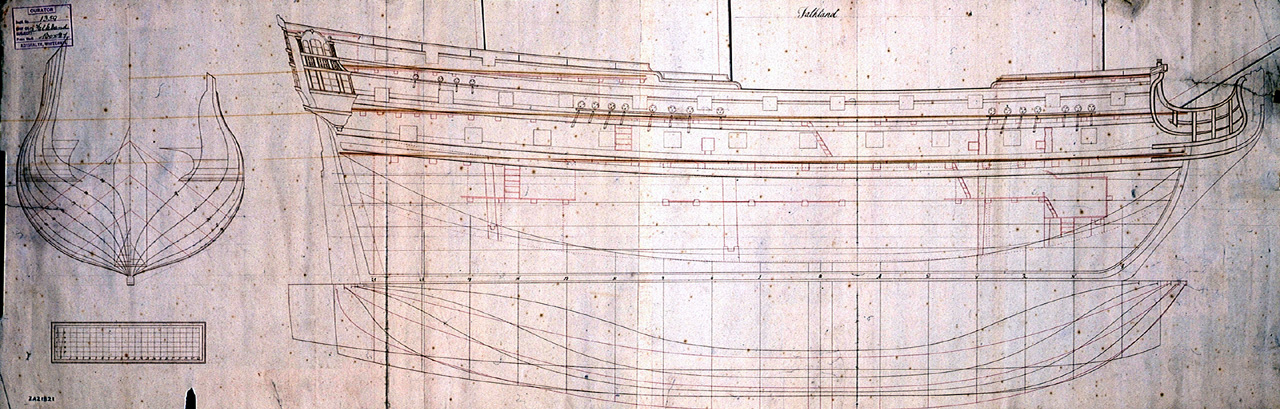
- Falkland, a plan of a 1720 rebuild

History

Great Britain
- Name: HMS Falkland
- Builder: Holland, New Castle, New Hampshire
- Acquired: 2 March 1696
- Fate: Transferred to Victualling Department, 10 August 1768

General characteristics as built
- Class & type: 50-gun fourth rate ship of the line
- Tons burthen: 638
- Length: 128 ft 6 in (39.2 m) (gundeck)
- Beam: 33 ft 2 in (10.1 m)
- Depth of hold: 13 ft 7.5 in (4.2 m)
- Propulsion: Sails
- Sail plan: Full-rigged ship
- Armament: 50 guns of various weights of shot

General characteristics after 1702 rebuild
- Class & type: 46-54-gun fourth rate ship of the line
- Tons burthen: 638
- Length: 128 ft 6 in (39.2 m) (gundeck)
- Beam: 33 ft 2 in (10.1 m)
- Depth of hold: 13 ft 9 in (4.2 m)
- Propulsion: Sails
- Sail plan: Full-rigged ship
- Armament: 46-54 guns of various weights of shot

General characteristics after 1720 rebuild
- Class & type: 1719 Establishment 50-gun fourth rate ship of the line
- Tons burthen: 756
- Length: 134 ft (40.8 m) (gundeck)
- Beam: 36 ft (11.0 m)
- Depth of hold: 15 ft 2 in (4.6 m)
- Propulsion: Sails
- Sail plan: Full-rigged ship
- Armament: 50 guns: Gundeck: 22 × 18 pdrs; Upper gundeck: 22 × 9 pdrs; Quarterdeck: 4 × 6 pdrs; Forecastle: 2 × 6 pdrs

General characteristics after 1744 rebuild
- Class & type: 1741 proposals 50-gun fourth rate ship of the line
- Tons burthen: 974
- Length: 140 ft (42.7 m) (gundeck)
- Beam: 40 ft (12.2 m)
- Depth of hold: 17 ft 2.5 in (5.2 m)
- Propulsion: Sails
- Sail plan: Full-rigged ship
- Armament: 50 guns: Gundeck: 22 × 24 pdrs; Upper gundeck: 22 × 12 pdrs; Quarterdeck: 4 × 6 pdrs; Forecastle: 2 × 6 pdrs

HMS Falkland was a 50-gun fourth-rate ship of the line of the Royal Navy, built by Holland of New Castle, New Hampshire, and purchased by the navy in 1696.

She had the distinction of being the first warship built in what would nearly a century later become the United States of America. She was ordered by the British Admiralty in 1690 and delivered on 2 March 1696. Upon the request of the Admiralty to give an opinion of the quality of American timber, the Thames shipwrights stated the material was "of so infirm a nature as not to be fit for use in His Majesty's ships". During her career she escorted merchant ships to America, and in 1704 engaged the 36-gun French ship La Seine off the Azores. Together with HMS Dreadnought they succeeded in capturing her and renamed her HMS Falkland Prize.

She was rebuilt for the first time at Chatham Dockyard in 1702 as a fourth rate of between 46 and 54 guns. Her second rebuilt took place at Deptford, where she was reconstructed according to the 1719 Establishment and relaunched on 28 August 1720. On 8 December 1742 orders were issued for Falkland to be taken to pieces and rebuilt for what was to be the final time at Bursledon, where she was reconstructed according to the 1741 proposals of the 1719 Establishment by Philemon Ewer, and relaunched on 17 March 1744. Falkland was one of the ships dispatched to search for the missing HMS Victory in 1744, and eventually discovered her likely fate when she stopped to re-provision at Guernsey.

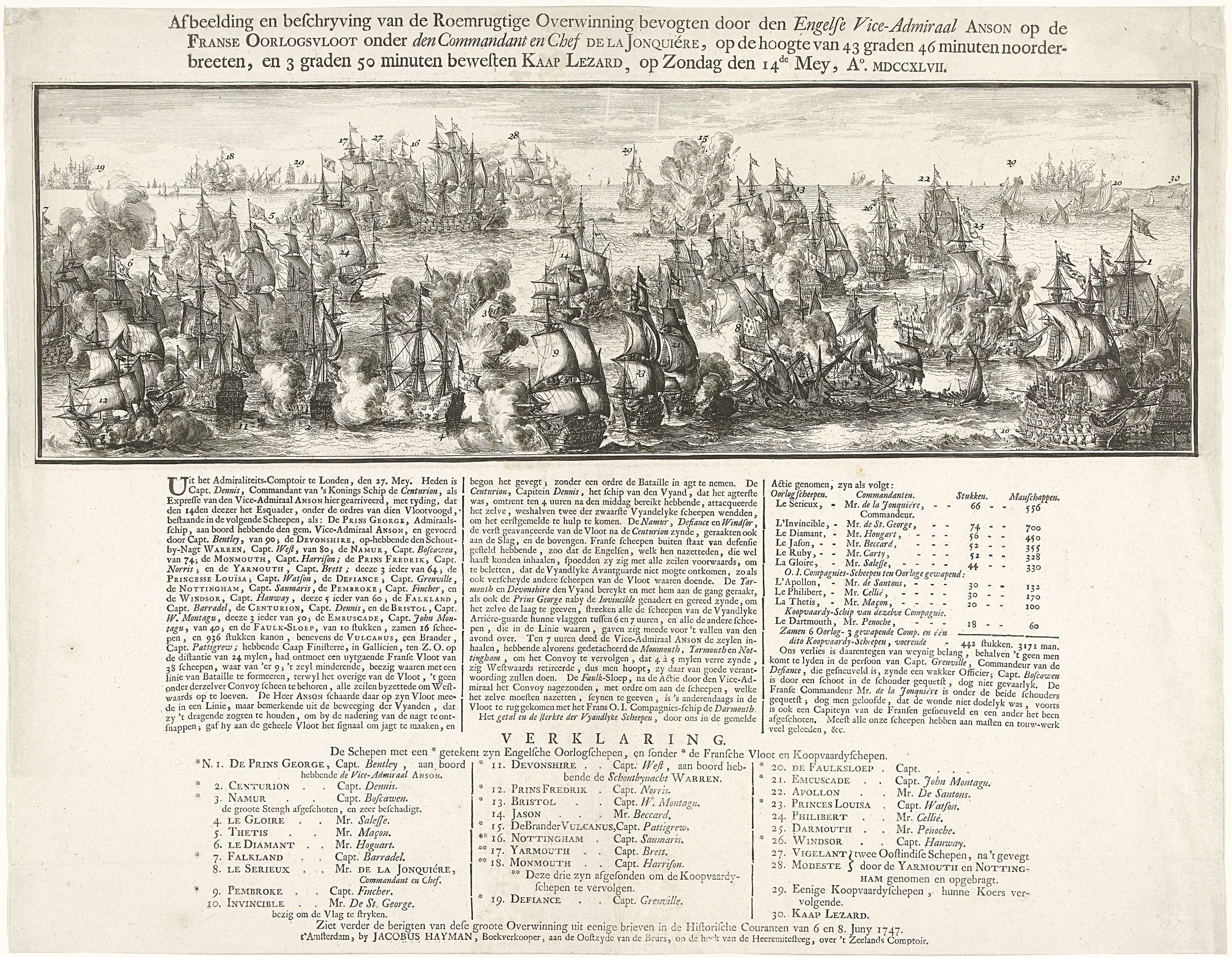
Falkland shown here at the First Battle of Cape Finisterre (1747)

Falkland was transferred to the Victualling Department on 10 August 1768.
