= Langstone Bridge =

Road bridge in Hampshire, England

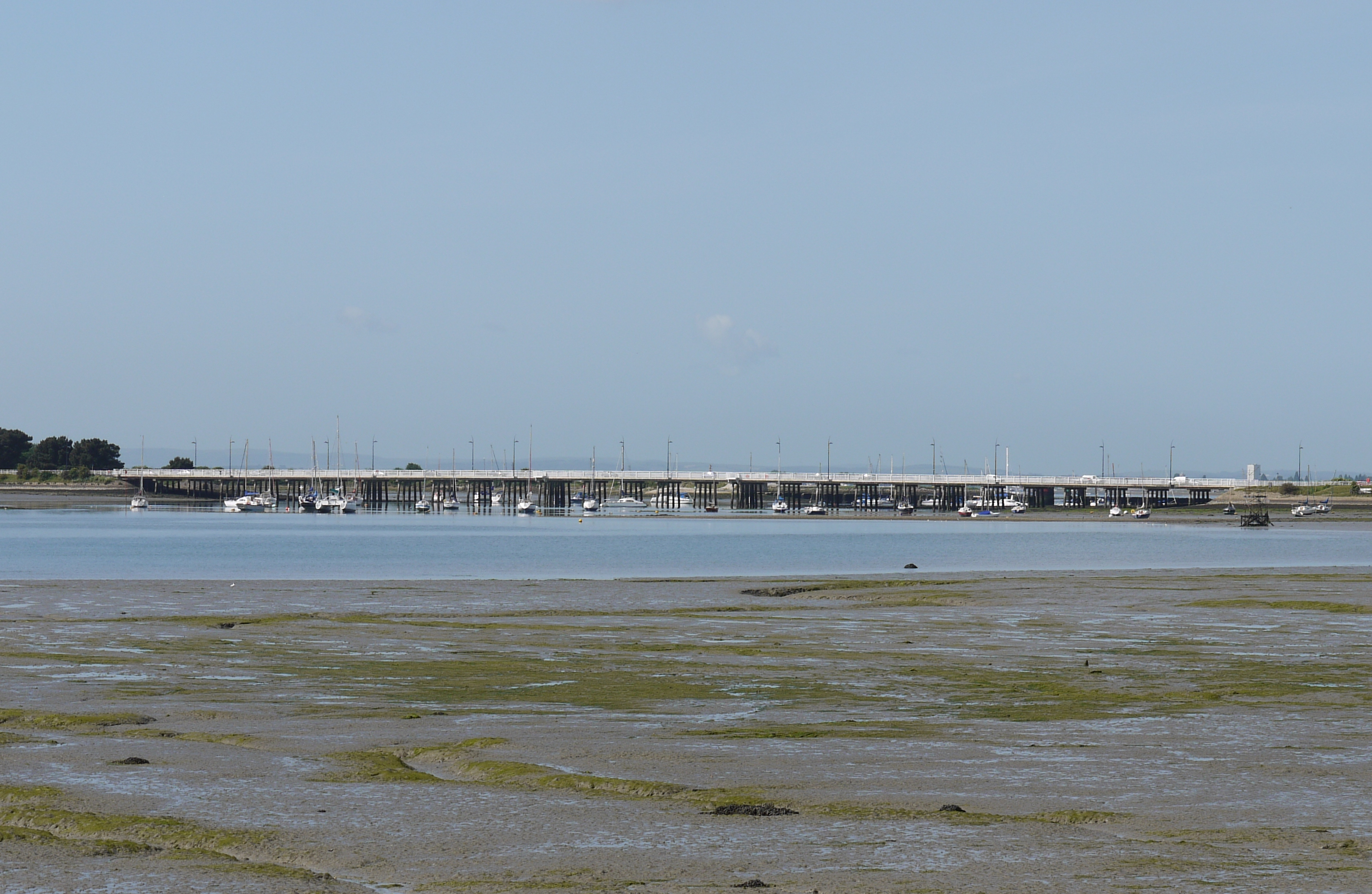
- Langstone bridge, seen from the east.
- Coordinates: 50°50′04″N 0°58′43″W

Characteristics
- Material: Concrete and steel
- Piers in water: 2

History
- Construction start: 1956
- Opened: 1960

Location
- Interactive map of Langstone Bridge

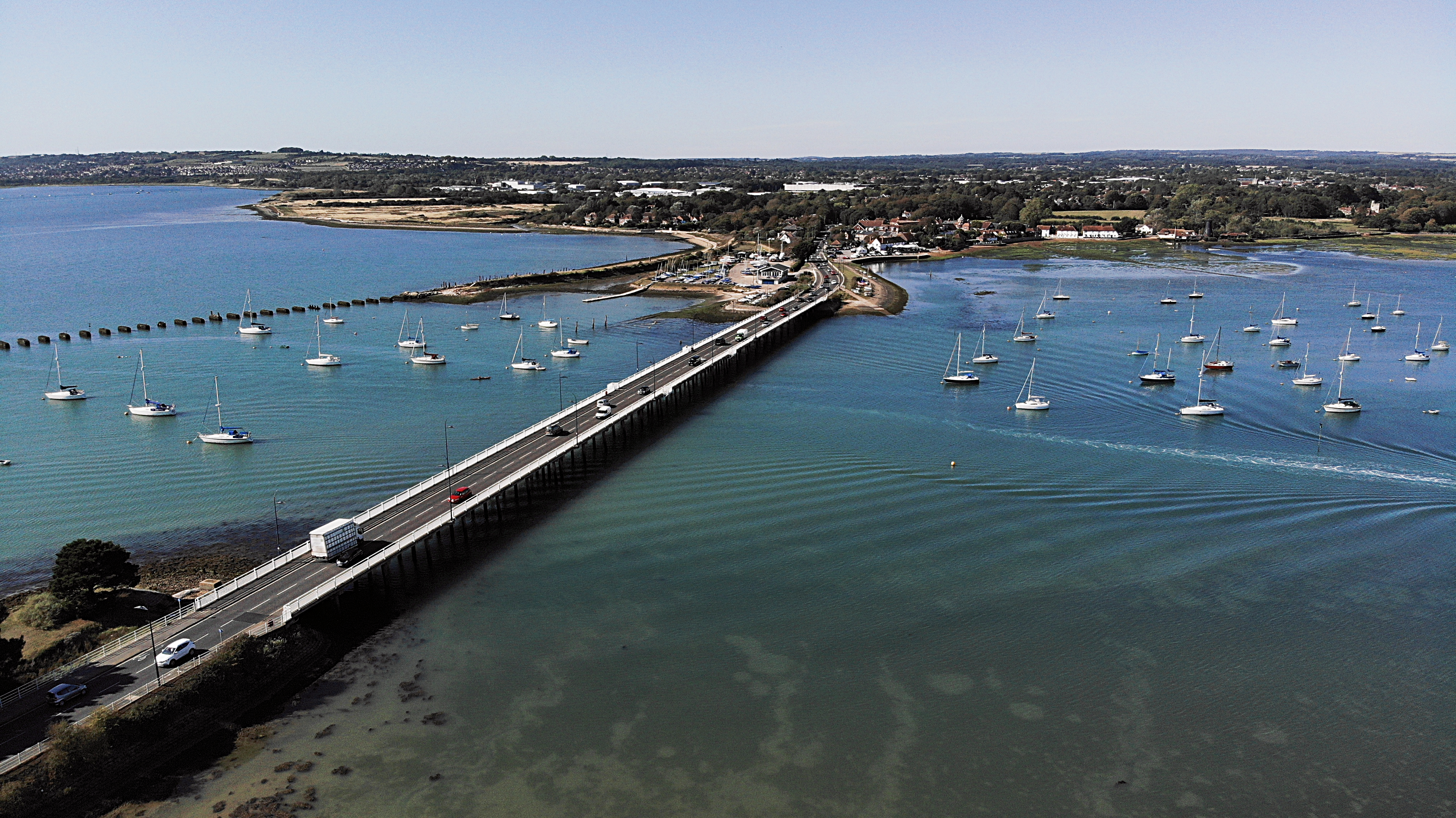
Langstone bridge from Hayling Island

Langstone Bridge (also known as Hayling Bridge) connects Hayling Island with the English mainland of Hampshire.

The name of the bridge is derived from its location at the coastal village of Langstone.

Historically connection was by a causeway known as the Wadeway; this was severed by the construction of the Portsmouth and Arundel Canal.

== Wadeway ==
The Wadeway or Wade Way is an original and historic causeway to Hayling Island; however, it is now impassable, having been cut in two by a deep channel for the Portsmouth and Chichester Canal in the 1820s. It was classified as a bridleway in 1988, and is shown as such on modern Ordnance Survey maps in spite of its use being considered hazardous at best. Excavation of this feature in 2006, constructed on a natural high point in the harbour, put its date in the Roman to medieval range but found no evidence to be more specific.

== Wooden bridge ==
The canal company funded a replacement wooden road bridge served by a toll-house situated at the northern end. There was a weight limit and after World War II only single-decker buses were allowed across; if they were carrying too many passengers some had to get out and walk, regardless of the weather, to reduce axle-weight. The old wooden bridge was demolished following construction of a concrete bridge in the late 1950s.

== The 1956 bridge ==
A replacement concrete bridge opened in 1956, initially still as a toll bridge. The new bridge is owned by Hampshire County Council and was operated without tolls from April 1960. The construction work on the new bridge was carried out by Christiani and Nielsen.

== Railway bridge ==
A railway bridge was constructed for the Hayling Island branch line in the 1860s. This became disused after the railway's closure and the remains survive to the west of the current bridge.
