= HMS Anson (1747) =

Fourth-rate ship of the line

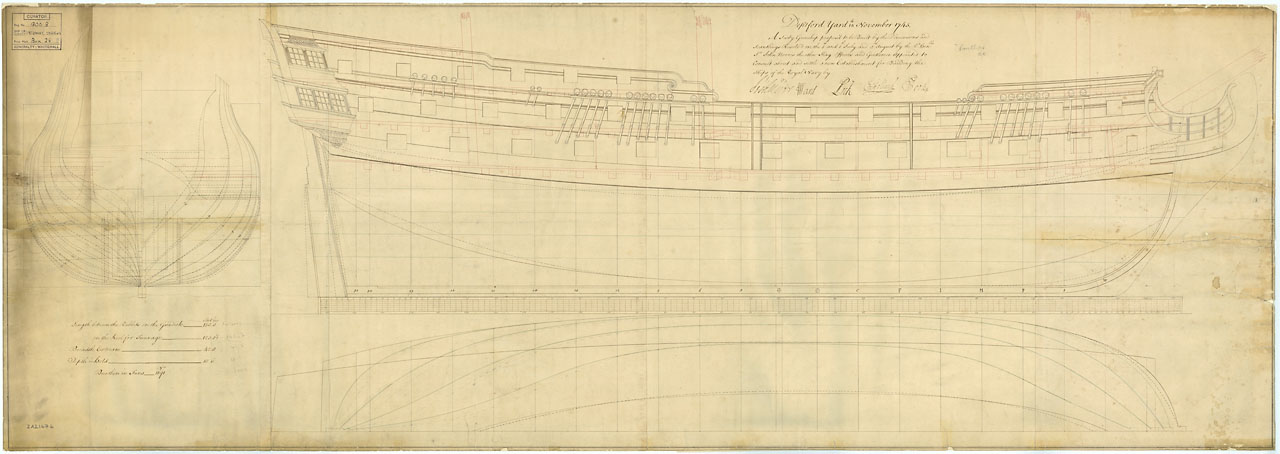
- Anson

History

Great Britain
- Name: HMS Anson
- Ordered: 6 August 1745
- Builder: Ewer, Bursledon
- Launched: 10 October 1747
- Fate: Sold, 1773

General characteristics
- Class & type: 1745 Establishment 60-gun fourth rate ship of the line
- Length: 150 ft (45.7 m) (gundeck)
- Beam: 42 ft 8 in (13.0 m)
- Depth of hold: 18 ft 6 in (5.6 m)
- Propulsion: Sails
- Sail plan: Full-rigged ship
- Armament: 60 guns: Gundeck: 24 × 24-pounders; Upper gundeck: 26 × 18-pounders; Quarterdeck: 8 × 6-pounders; Forecastle: 2 × 6-pounders

HMS Anson was a 60-gun fourth rate ship of the line of the Royal Navy, built at Bursledon by Philemon Ewer to the draught specified by the 1745 Establishment, and launched on 10 October 1747.

Anson served until 1773, when she was sold out of the navy.

Today, a model of the ship appears on a monument to Ewer in Bursledon parish church.
