= Brooklands, Sarisbury =

18th-century country house in Sarisbury in Fareham, England

Coordinates: 50°52′41″N 1°17′45″W

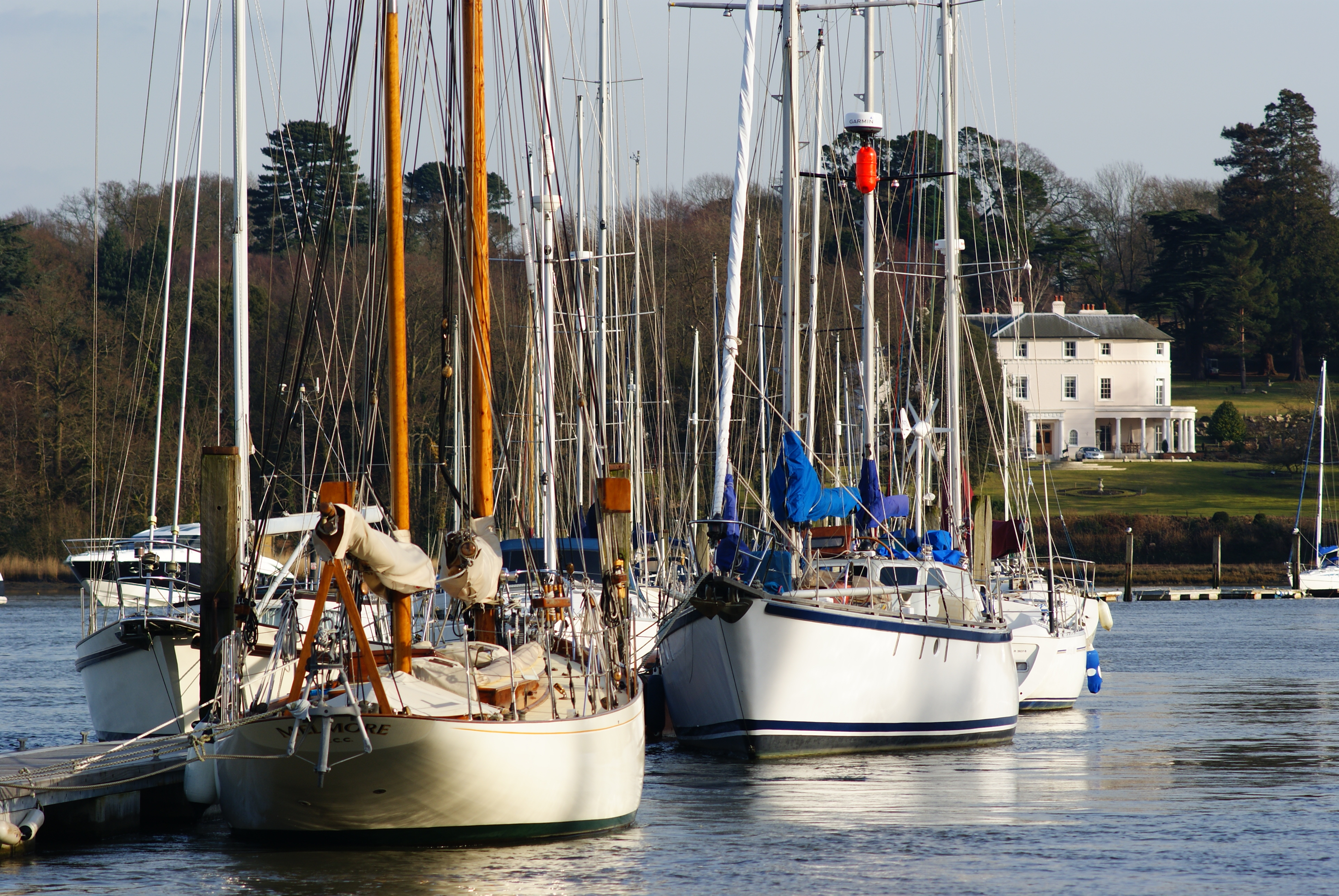
A distant view of Brooklands from the jetty of the Jolly Sailor pub in Bursledon

Brooklands is an 18th-century country house in Sarisbury in Fareham in the English county of Hampshire. The grounds of the house overlook the River Hamble. It has been listed Grade II* on the National Heritage List for England since October 1976.

== House ==
The house was designed by John Nash in the Georgian style and built for Admiral Sir Thomas Williams of the Royal Navy. It was constructed around 1800, with a service wing was added to the north west of the house in 1807. The front was remodelled in the Italianate style in 1858 by the Isle of Wight architect Langdon. The entrance lobby and top floor was added in 1854. The interior features a double-flight stone staircase with cast-iron balustrades. Edwin Lutyens extended the house to the south east in 1916. The house is made from red brick and is partly rendered in stucco. The drawing room was lined with limed oak by Basil Ionides. Ionides also created a pair of bathrooms in the house, one of which has yellow tiles decorated with the signs of the zodiac. A bedroom on the second floor features decorated handmade tiles of fish designed by Hugh Casson. The first floor has six bedrooms, five of which are en-suite. An additional four bedrooms are on the second floor.

== History ==
The writers Jane Austen and A. A. Milne were frequent guests at the house. Austen's cousin was the first wife of Admiral Williams. Milne's wife, Daphne, was raised at Brooklands.

In a 2005 article Country Life described Brooklands as "[epitomising] the very best of Englishness" and that "Historically, architecturally and horticulturally, Brooklands's pedigree is faultless".

In 2005 Brooklands was put up for sale with Knight Frank for £5.3 million. The estate included 29 acres of grounds with 160 yards of river frontage.

== Gardens ==
The house has 29 acres of grounds and landscaped gardens with a summer house and swimming pool. The grounds were laid out by Humphrey Repton, the formal gardens to the east, west and south were designed by Gertrude Jekyll. Jekyll's designs for the house feature lawns, banks of azaleas and rhododendrons and herbaceous borders. 2024 The original gardens to the North East were returned to the Brooklands estate and the removal of the property on the land removed.
