= Langstone Windmill =

Windmill in Langstone, Hampshire, England

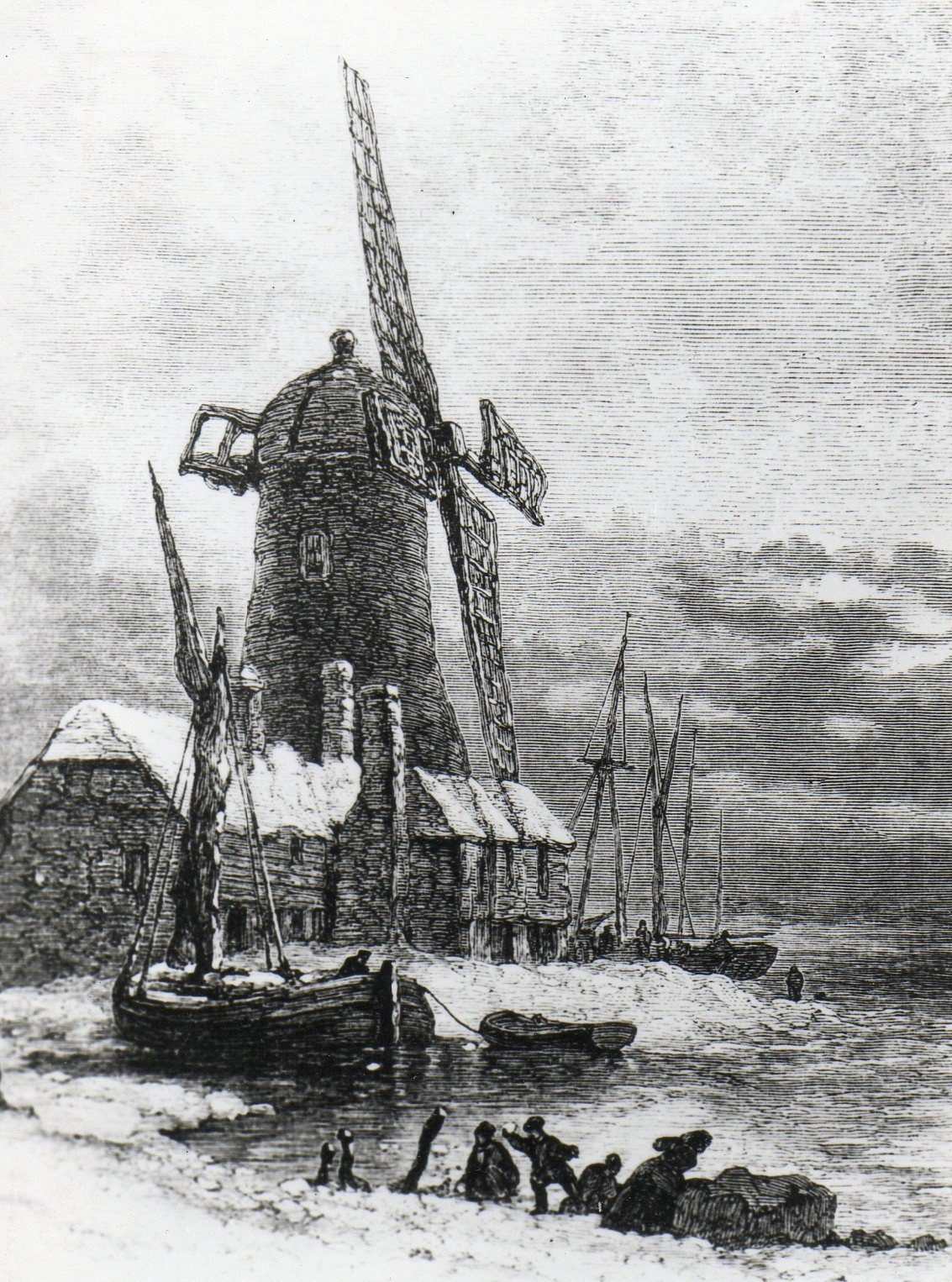
- The mill in 1869

Origin
- Mill name: Langstone Mill
- Grid reference: SU 7199 0494
- Coordinates: 50.8395°N 0.9787°W
- Operator(s): Private

Information
- Purpose: Corn mill
- Type: Tower mill
- Storeys: Four storeys
- No. of sails: Four sails
- Type of sails: Common sails
- Windshaft: Wood
- Winding: Hand winded

Langstone Windmill is a Grade II listed tower mill at Langstone, Hampshire in England. It has been converted to residential accommodation.

== History ==
Langstone Mill was built around 1730. It worked in conjunction with a tide mill close by. The mill was derelict in 1934. By 1939 it had been converted to residential accommodation, with the tower tarred and a new cap constructed. The conversion was to a design by Ernst L. Freud with the first resident being Flora Twort.

== Description ==
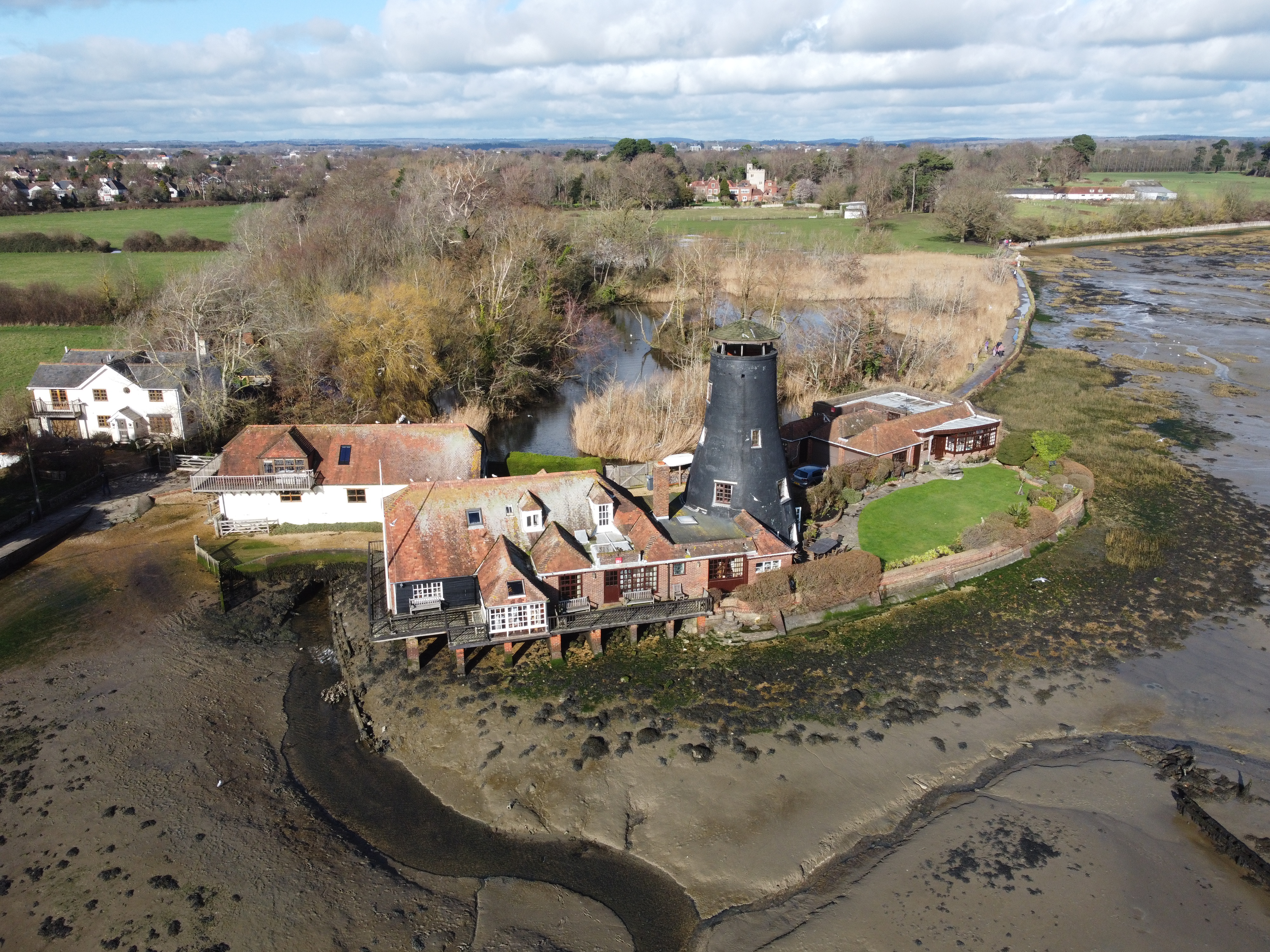
Langstone Mill

Langstone Mill is a four-storey tower mill which shows evidence of having been raised by a storey at some point. It had a hand winded domed cap and the four common sails were carried on a wooden windshaft.
