= HMS Tavistock (1747) =

Ship of the line of the Royal Navy

History

Great Britain
- Name: HMS Tavistock
- Ordered: 18 October 1745
- Builder: Hugh Blaydes, Kingston upon Hull
- Laid down: November 1746
- Launched: 26 August 1747
- Commissioned: 25 December 1747 at builders
- In service: 1747-1752; 1758-1760
- Fate: Broken up at Woolwich Dockyard, 1768

General characteristics
- Class & type: 1745 Establishment 50-gun fourth rate ship of the line
- Tons burthen: 1,061 6/94 (bm)
- Length: 144 ft 0 in (43.9 m) (gundeck); 117 ft 8.5 in (35.9 m) (keel)
- Beam: 41 ft 2 in (12.5 m)
- Depth of hold: 17 ft 8 in (5.4 m)
- Sail plan: Full-rigged ship
- Complement: 350
- Armament: 50 guns: Lower deck: 22 × 24 pdrs; Upper deck: 22 × 12 pdrs; Quarterdeck: 4 × 6 pdrs; Forecastle: 2 × 6 pdrs

HMS Tavistock was a 50-gun fourth rate ship of the line of the Royal Navy.

She was built by Hugh Blaydes at Blaydes Yard in Kingston upon Hull to the draught specified in the 1745 Establishment. She was fitted out in Portsmouth and launched on 26 August 1747.

She had two commanders: Captain Justinian Nutt and Commodore Francis Holburne and had a crew of 350 men. She served in North America and the Caribbean (based at the Leeward Islands.

Tavistock was converted to serve as a hulk in 1758, and was broken up in Woolwich in 1768.
