= Bursledon Windmill =

Historic windmill in England

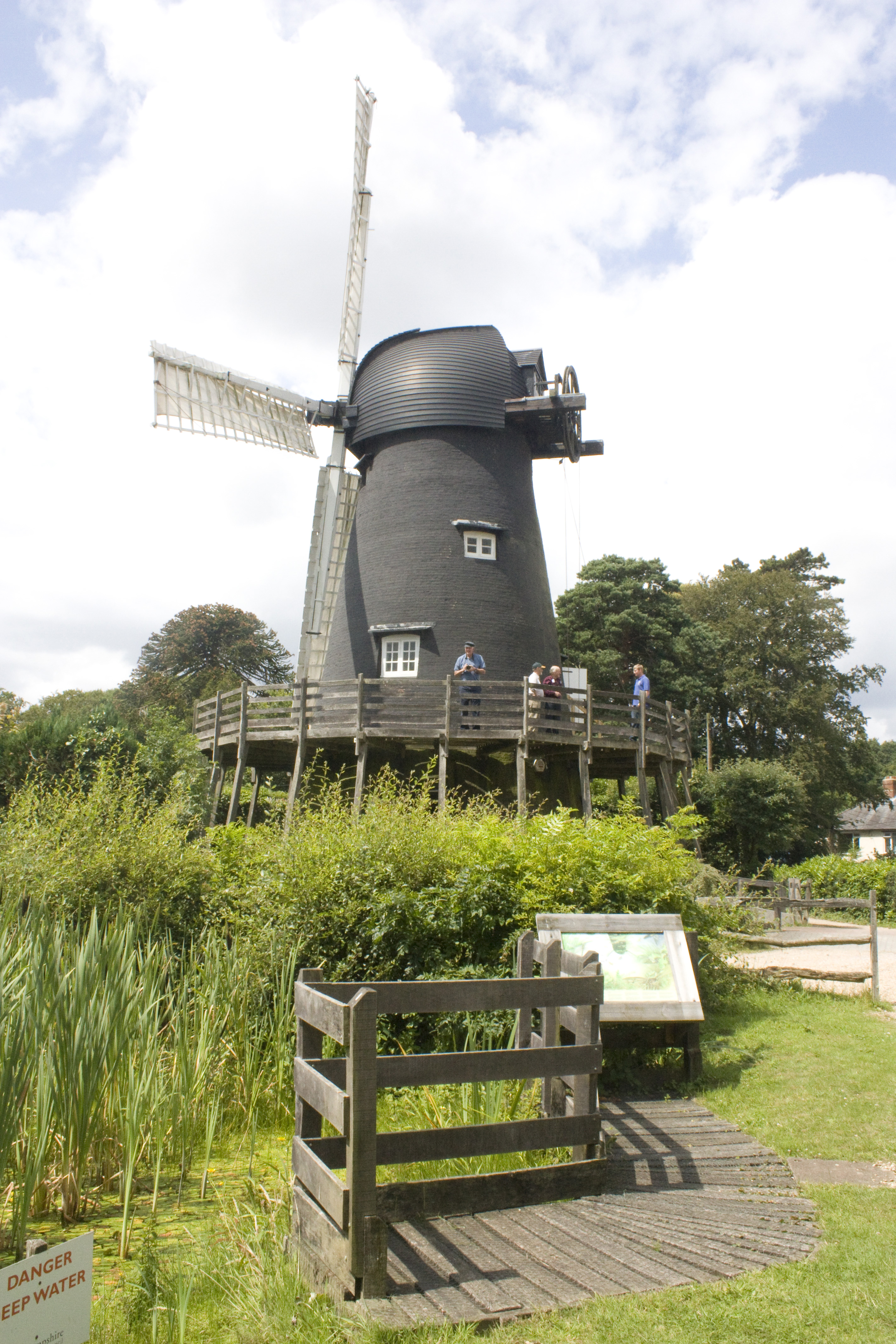
- Hampshire's only working windmill
- Interactive map of Bursledon Windmill

Origin
- Mill name: Bursledon Mill
- Mill location: Bursledon, Eastleigh, Hampshire
- Grid reference: SU 482 108
- Coordinates: 50°53′42″N 1°18′54″W
- Operator: Hampshire Buildings Preservation Trust
- Year built: 1814

Information
- Purpose: Corn mill
- Type: tower mill
- Storeys: Five storeys
- No. of sails: Four sails
- Type of sails: Common sails
- Windshaft: Wood
- Winding: Hand winded via chain and wheel
- No. of pairs of millstones: Three
- Other information

Listed Building – Grade II*
- Designated: 14 February 1983
- Reference no.: 1281479

Bursledon Windmill is a Grade II* listed windmill in Bursledon, Hampshire, England which has been restored to working order.

== Description ==
Bursledon mill is a five-storey tower mill with a reefing stage at first floor level. The boat shaped cap is winded by a chain and wheel. The four Common sails are carried on a wooden windshaft, which also carries the wooden brake wheel. This drives the wooden wallower, located at the top of the wooden upright shaft. The wooden great spur wheel at the bottom of the upright shaft drives three pairs of underdrift millstones.

== Commercial history ==
When operating, Bursledon Windmill is Hampshire's only working windmill and was built in 1814 by a Mrs. Phoebe Langtry, replacing an earlier post mill which was built about 1768. After falling into despair, it was restored and then re-opened in 1990 as a working windmill and heritage visitor attraction. The machinery of the earlier mill was incorporated into the new mill. In 1814, the mill was mortgaged for £800 for six years. The mill was sold by the mortgagees in 1820. The mill was working until the 1880s initially by Mrs. Langtry's son, Wiliam Langtry. John Cove and his family worked this mill between 1847 and 1871. The UK census shows he had worked a mill in Portsmouth and originally came from Wiltshire. He and his wife Susannah Emmett both came from Wiltshire and are responsible for the nearly all the Cove family in Southampton. His daughter Mary married a Jarvis and ran the Jolly Sailor public house in Hamble, one of his other daughters ran a market garden at the end of Windmill Lane and his son John Cove became a farm labourer. The last miller was George Gosling who bought the mill in 1872.

== Decline of the windmill ==
When the mill ceased working, a flat roof was placed on the cap frame, which preserved the machinery in the mill. In 1931, the runner stones were removed. The mill was derelict by 1978, the top two floors being in very poor condition by then. Some essential repairs were carried out in that year by the County Council.

== Restoration of the windmill ==
Between 1978 and 1991, the mill was restored by the Hampshire Buildings Preservation Trust. The sails were replaced in 1990 and the mill opened to the public in May 1991.

== Ongoing maintenance of the windmill ==
In February 2012, the start of a major restoration to the windmill began. The first stage saw the removal of the wooden lattices that make up the sails. This work was in preparation for the replacement of the windshaft which had reached the end of its natural life. The work was completed in November 2014. The Mill is owned by Hampshire Buildings Preservation Trust (Ltd) and was leased to Hampshire County Council on a 35 year full repairing lease, and in 2014 the lease was renewed for a further 10 years in 2014/15. In 2014 the windmill was sublet by Hampshire County Council to the Hampshire Cultural Trust as part of a larger transfer of museums from Hampshire County Council and Winchester City Council. In April 2024 the windmill closed to the public due to financial difficulties.

The board of Hampshire Buildings Preservation Trust worked towards opening it up again for guided tours and events. and in September 2026 it was announced that the National Lottery Heritage Fund had awarded £247,000 for the "Turning Around the Burseldon Windmill" project. The project supports a programme of repairs and improvements to the site including the reinstatement of its sails. Eastleigh Borough Council's Bursledon, Hamble and Hound Local Area Committee also supported the bid by allocating £25,000 in match funding. The windmill will reopen in Spring/Summer 2027.

== Millers ==
- William Langtry 1787–1813 (post mill)
- William Langtry 1814–1820 (son of the above)
- John Cove 1847–1871
- George Gosling 1872–1907
