= HMS Ruby (1745) =

Ship of the line of the Royal Navy

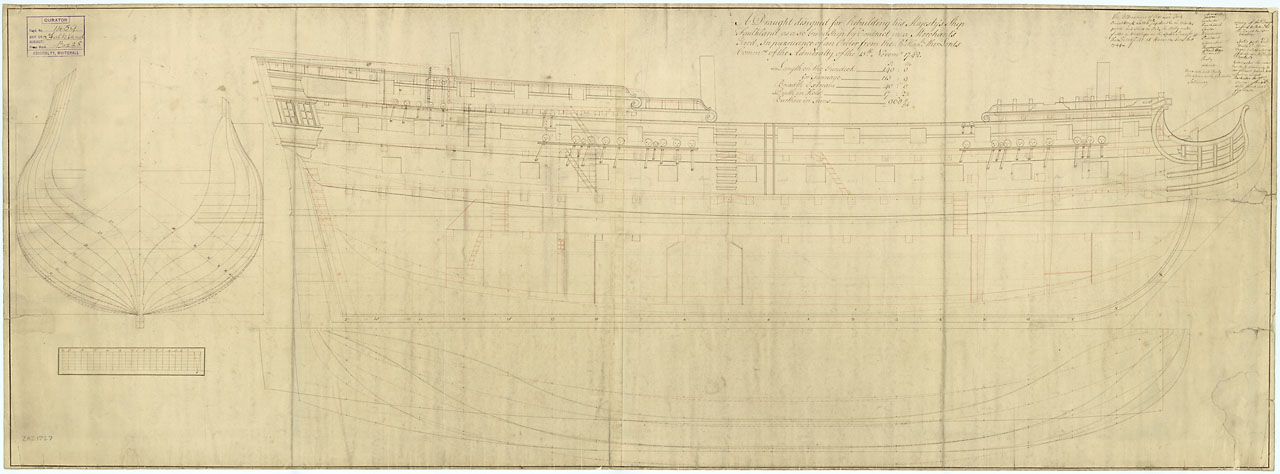
- Plan of the Ruby

History

Great Britain
- Name: HMS Ruby
- Ordered: 30 September 1743
- Builder: Ewer, Bursledon
- Launched: 3 August 1745
- Fate: Broken up, 1765

General characteristics
- Class & type: 1741 proposals 50-gun fourth rate ship of the line
- Tons burthen: 988 68/94 (bm)
- Length: 140 ft (42.7 m) (gundeck)
- Beam: 40 ft (12.2 m)
- Depth of hold: 17 ft 2 1/2 in (5.2 m)
- Propulsion: Sails
- Sail plan: Full-rigged ship
- Armament: 50 guns: Gundeck: 22 × 24 pdrs; Upper gundeck: 22 × 12 pdrs; Quarterdeck: 4 × 6 pdrs; Forecastle: 2 × 6 pdrs

HMS Ruby was a 50-gun fourth rate ship of the line of the Royal Navy, built at Bursledon in Hampshire to the dimensions specified in the 1741 proposals of the 1719 Establishment, and launched on 3 August 1745.

Ruby was broken up in 1765.
