= Hayling Billy =

UK nature reserve

Coordinates: 50.812°N 0.987°W

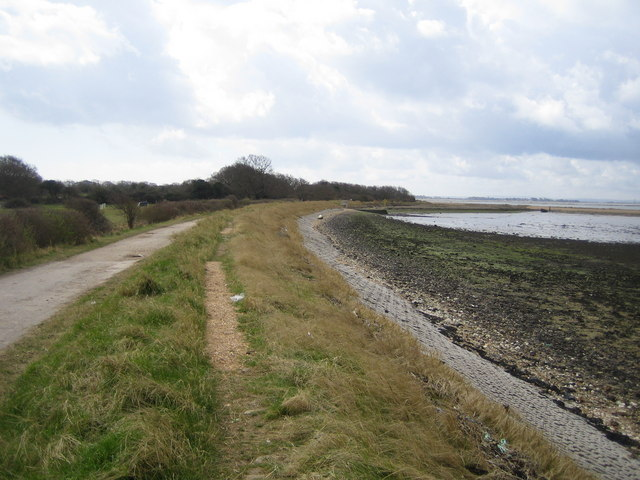
- Interactive map of Hayling Billy
- Type: Local Nature Reserve
- Location: Hayling Island, Hampshire
- OS grid: SU 716 025
- Area: 42 hectares (100 acres)
- Manager: Hampshire Countryside Service

Hayling Billy is a 42-hectare (100-acre) Local Nature Reserve on Hayling Island in Hampshire. It is owned by Hampshire County Council and managed by Hampshire Countryside Service. It is part of Chichester and Langstone Harbours Ramsar site and Special Protection Area, Solent Maritime Special Area of Conservation and Langstone Harbour Site of Special Scientific Interest.

This is a footpath along the former Hayling Island branch railway line along the eastern shore of Langstone Harbour between Havant and South Hayling.
