= The Jolly Sailor, Bursledon =

18th-century public house in Hampshire, England

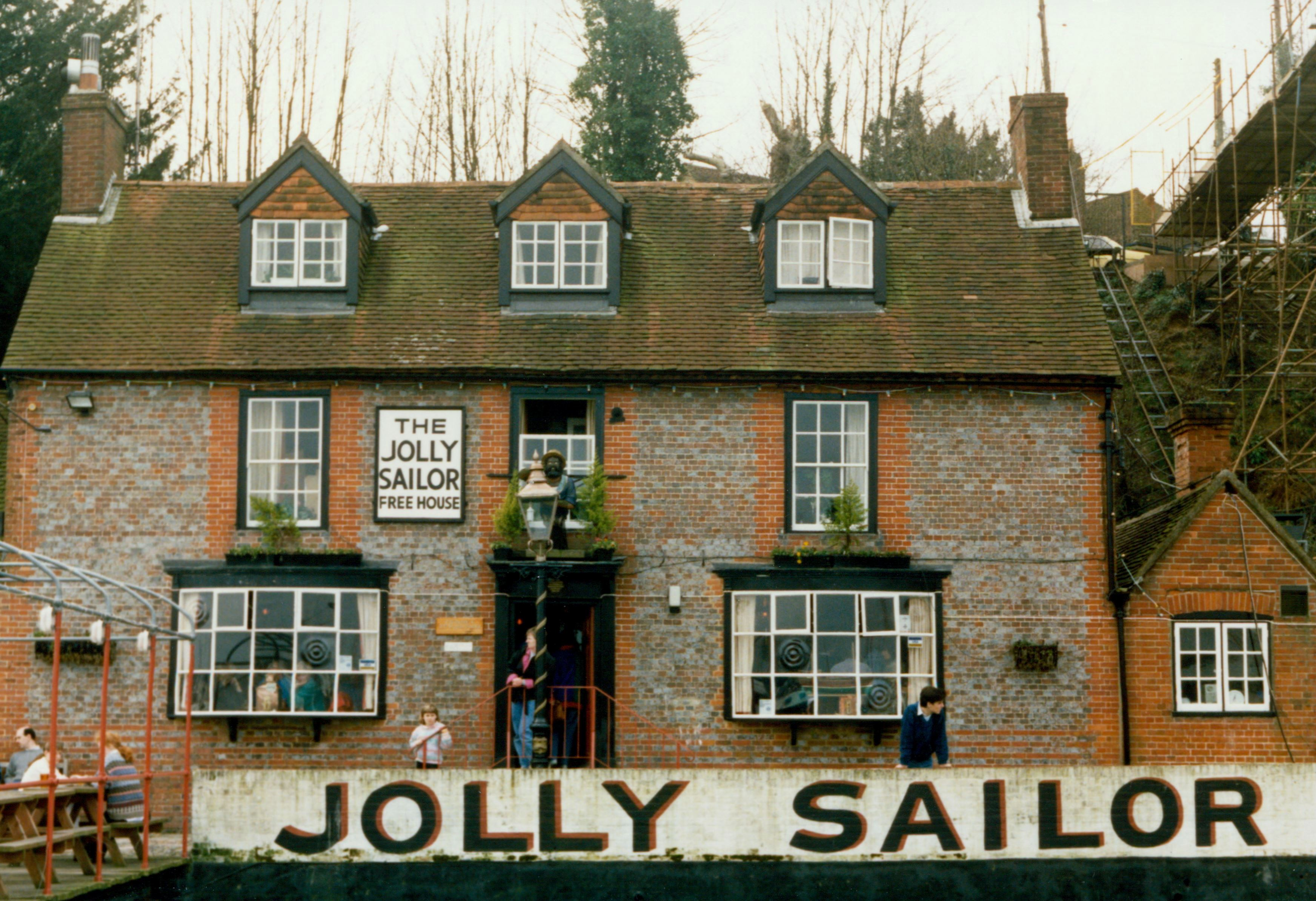
- The view from the waterside

- Location within Hampshire
- 50°52′55″N 1°18′16″W
- Type: Public house
- Location: Bursledon
- OS grid reference: SU 49035 09377

History
- Built: 18th century

Site notes
- Area: Hampshire
- Owner: Hall and Woodhouse

Listed Building – Grade II
- Official name: Jolly Sailor public house
- Designated: 5 December 1955
- Reference no.: 1111970

The Jolly Sailor is an 18th-century public house on Land's End Road in Bursledon in Hampshire, England. It has been listed Grade II on the National Heritage List for England since December 1955. The pub can be approached on foot or by boat via a pontoon onto the River Hamble. The pub faces Swanwick Marina across the water. It is owned by Hall and Woodhouse brewery.

It is two storeys in height with an attic and made from brick with a red tiled roof. The rear of the pub is made from Flemish bond brick with the front made from alternate bands of blue header and red stretcher bricks. The pub has two ships figureheads displayed on the exterior. It has been a pub since 1845, having originally been built as a vicarage. The interior of the pub features various maritime paraphernalia such as ship's lanterns.

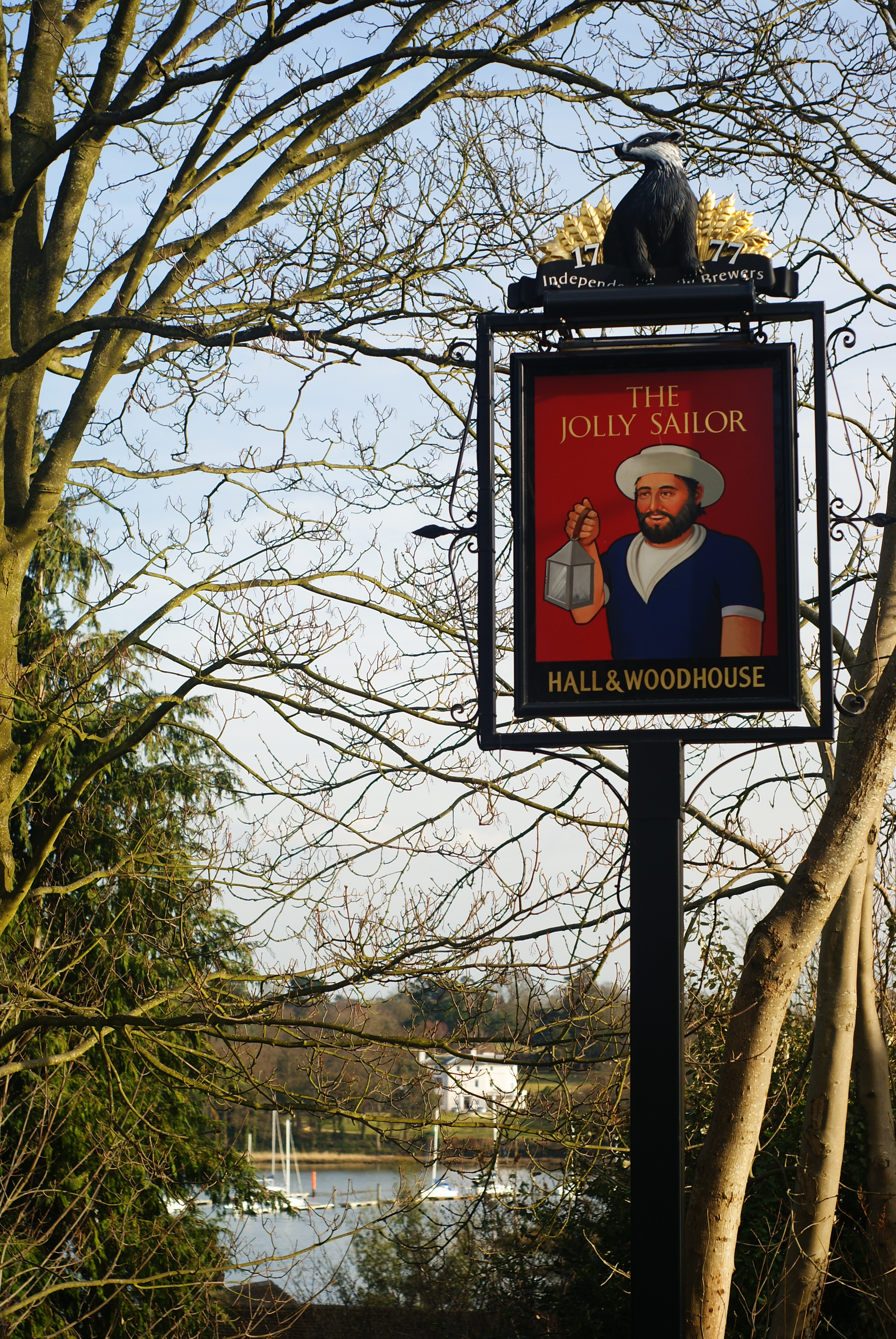
The sign of The Jolly Sailor

The Jolly Sailor was included in the Daily Telegraph's Pint to Pint: A Crawl Around Britain's Best Pubs. In 2007 Country Life listed it as one of 'Six Classic Sailor's Pubs'. It has been included in The Good Pub Guide.

It was featured as the local pub in the 1980s BBC television drama Howards' Way.
