= Mike Mitchell (cricketer) =

English cricketer and schoolmaster (1843–1905)

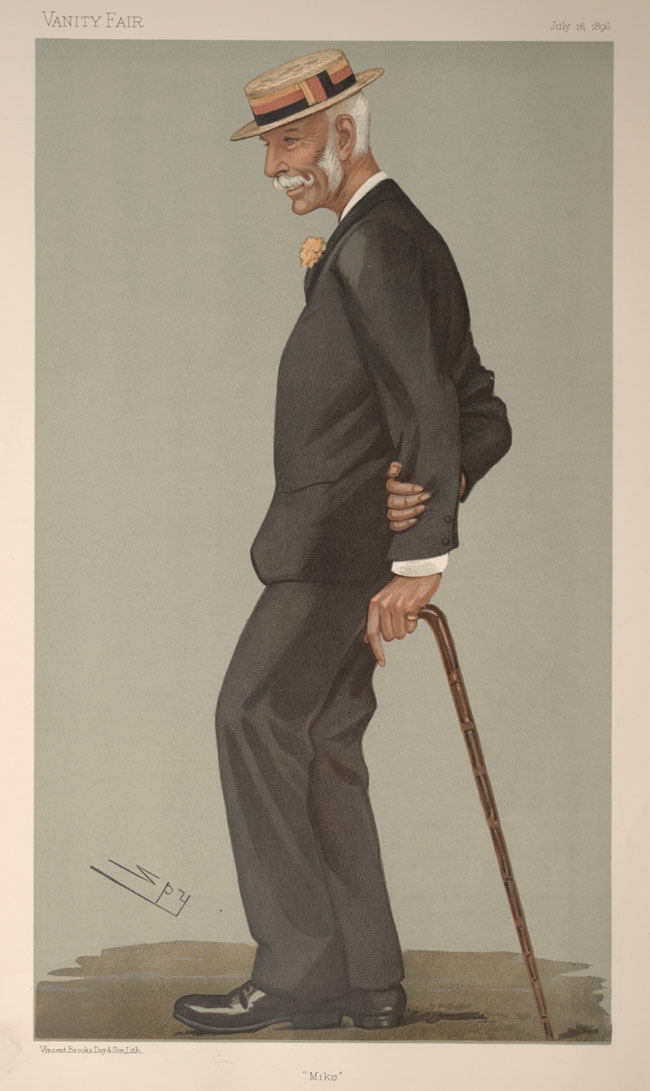
- "Mike". Caricature by Spy published in Vanity Fair magazine, 16 July 1896.

Personal information
- Full name: Richard Arthur Henry Mitchell
- Born: 22 January 1843; Enderby Hall, Leicester, England
- Died: 19 April 1905 (aged 62); Mayford House, Woking, Surrey, England

Richard Arthur Henry Mitchell (22 January 1843 - 19 April 1905), widely known as Mike Mitchell, was an English schoolmaster and amateur cricketer who played from 1861 to 1883 and supervised the Eton cricket team for more than thirty years.

== Life ==
Mitchell was educated at Eton and played for the school cricket team from 1858 to 1861, being captain in the latter year. From Eton he went to Balliol College, Oxford to read modern history. As a cricketer he won a Blue in all four years at the university, and was the Oxford captain for all but his first year. While he was in his third year at Balliol, his father suffered financial ruin, and Mitchell had the unexpected task of finding a livelihood. He switched courses from history to classics and secured a second-class honours degree which enabled him to gain appointment as a master at Eton in 1866, remaining there until compelled by ill-health to retire in 1901. Between 1866 and 1897 he was the principal adviser and coach of the school's cricket team. He was a member of the Marylebone Cricket Club (MCC) Committee from 1902 until his death three years later. A later Eton master, G. W. Lyttleton, who as a schoolboy had played under Mitchell's supervision, called him a "philistine housemaster" and said: "Unless you were a dab (hand) at some game you cut no ice". Among Mitchell's Etonian protégés was George Harris, who as Lord Harris became one of the most influential of cricket administrators.

Mitchell married Mary Henrietta Ley, the second daughter of Henry Ley, Clerk of the House of Commons. Mitchell was the father of the courtier and cricketer Sir Frank Mitchell.

== Career ==
Mitchell was a right-handed batsman, occasional wicket-keeper and right arm medium pace roundarm bowler. Mainly associated with the Eton Ramblers, Oxford University and Marylebone Cricket Club (MCC), he made 57 known appearances. He played for the Gentlemen in the Gentlemen v Players series. He was regarded by Haygarth as one of the leading players of his era. After leaving Oxford, he usually was only seen in important cricket at the Canterbury Festival where he made 21 appearances up to 1883.
