= Bursledon =

Village in Hampshire, England

Coordinates: 50.8847°N 1.3117°W

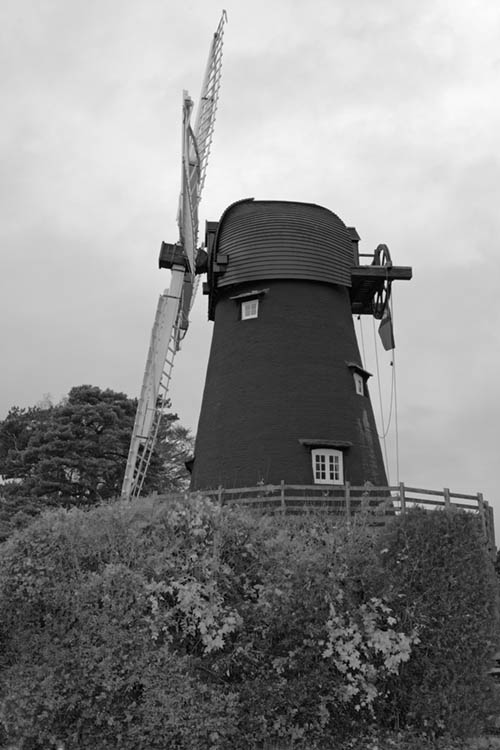
- Bursledon Windmill

- Location within Hampshire
- Population: 6,188 (2011 Census)
- OS grid reference: SU488095
- Civil parish: Bursledon
- District: Eastleigh
- Shire county: Hampshire
- Region: South East
- Country: England
- Sovereign state: United Kingdom
- Post town: SOUTHAMPTON
- Postcode district: SO31
- Dialling code: 023
- Police: Hampshire and Isle of Wight
- Fire: Hampshire and Isle of Wight
- Ambulance: South Central
- UK Parliament: Eastleigh
- Website: Bursledon Parish Council

Bursledon is a village on the River Hamble in Hampshire, England. It is located within the borough of Eastleigh. Close to the city of Southampton, Bursledon has a railway station, a marina, dockyards and the Bursledon Windmill. Nearby villages include Swanwick, Hamble-le-Rice, Netley and Sarisbury Green.

The village has close ties to the sea. The Elephant Boatyard located in Old Bursledon dates back centuries and is where Henry VIII's fleet was built as well as HMS Elephant (1786), from which the boatyard takes its name. Submerged remnants of the fleet can be found in the River Hamble. The village, particularly the Jolly Sailor pub and the Elephant Boatyard, were used as the primary filming venue for the 1980s BBC TV soap opera Howards' Way.

== Etymology ==
The village was known as Brixendona or Brixenden in the 12th century, Burstlesden in the 14th century, and Bristelden in the 16th century. The name probably means "Hill associated with a man called Beorhtsige", from Old English personal name meaning 'bright victory' and dun meaning "hill, modern down". It is unlikely the Beohrtsige is the same individual who gave his name to Brixton in South London.

== History ==
The original bridge carrying what is now the A27 road across the River Hamble was made of wood in 1783 and was a toll bridge. Bursledon's waterside position and woodland surroundings made it a natural location for building wooden ships. Numerous vessels were built for the Royal Navy at private shipyards at Bursledon, although a claim that two eighty-gun ships were constructed at Bursledon during the reign of William IV is untrue. The yard owned by Philemon Ewer in the 18th century was responsible for the building of the 50-gun HMS Falkland and the sloop HMS Lizard in 1744, the 50-gun HMS Ruby in 1745, the 24-gun HMS Fox in 1746, and the 60-gun HMS Anson in 1747 among other vessels. There is a monument to Ewer, who died in 1750, featuring a model of the Anson in the parish church. George Parsons's Bursledon shipyard built a number of naval ships from 1778 to 1807, when he moved to Warsash at the mouth of the River Hamble; this included HMS Elephant launched in 1786, which carried Nelson to the Battle of Copenhagen. Although most of the construction of these ships was carried out in Bursledon, they were sailed after their launchings to Portsmouth to be sheathed in copper there.

By the 1870s, the shipbuilding trade had disappeared from Bursledon and the main industry was arable agriculture, particularly the growing of strawberries.

The Bursledon Brickworks, based in the village of Swanwick (now in the Borough of Fareham), was founded in 1897 and produced the famous Fareham red brick. Today it is the last surviving example of a Victorian steam-powered brickworks in the country. The brickworks were sold to Hampshire Buildings Preservation Trust and can be visited as the Bursledon Brickworks Museum.

Due to increased traffic, in 1933-5 the old wooden bridge was replaced with the present three-span concrete structure. In the 1970s a further bridge was built to the north to carry the M27 motorway.

== People ==
Notable people from Bursledon include:

- Claude Grahame-White, aviation pioneer and aircraft manufacturer.
- Richard Page MC MBE (1910–2006), first-class cricketer and British Army officer
- Nicholas Armstrong, artistic director of the Brooklyn Symphony Orchestra.

== Folklore and local legends ==
According to local legend, the old Victorian bridge over the railway line on Coal Park Lane is haunted by the ghost of Polly Crook whose love of distilled apple cider and clay pipe caused her to accidentally ignite herself on this spot.

== See also ==
- List of places of worship in the Borough of Eastleigh
