= Charles Harrington =

Winchelsea, watercolour, 1925, Aberdeen Art Gallery

Charles Harrington (1865–1943) was an English artist, normally painting watercolour landscapes, in which he developed a distinctive style.

He was born and educated in Brighton, and later lived there and in Lewes. He was largely self-taught, but was broadly "a late exponent of the Cox-Collier tradition", as one of a group of watercolourists around the end of the 19th century, also including E.M. Wimperis, James Orrock, and Claude Hayes. They continued the broader and naturalistic approach of David Cox, Peter De Wint and Thomas Collier, rejecting Late Victorian grandiosity and over-precision. They also generally made less use of opaque bodycolour than many other painters of the period.

An Old Track, watercolour

His paintings are often relatively small, less than a foot across, and his subjects, where they are named, are mostly landscape views in Sussex or neighbouring counties. He liked to paint tall trees that often tower over the figures or animals. He may not have been able to have support himself as a painter all the time as he worked as a furniture salesman between 1910 and 1920.

His career as an artist seems to developed rather slowly. He is recorded as an exhibitor in eight Royal Academy Summer Exhibitions, between 1913 and 1935, so only beginning when he was nearly fifty. But he was in 1895, a founder member of the Brighton Art Club, a group of professional artists that held exhibitions until at least the 1930s. In 1910 he sold a number of paintings at their exhibition, the most expensive for 9 guineas (£1,000 pounds in 2026), of which the club took 10% commission. He also exhibited elsewhere, including at London commercial dealers' galleries such as the Fine Art Society, Dudley Gallery, Walker's Gallery, and museum and artists' society exhibitions of the Royal Institute of Painters in Water Colours, Royal Birmingham Society of Artists, Walker Art Gallery, and Manchester Academy of Fine Arts.

Cattle Resting below Trees, watercolour

His paintings are generally signed, and many dated, mostly to the 1920s, although there are dated examples from as early as 1901, and 1906.

== Death and legacy ==
He was killed in a German air raid in Southwick, West Sussex in 1943.

There were posthumous exhibitions at Walker's Gallery (a leading London dealer) in 1954, and the Fine Art Society in London in 1959.

Examples of his paintings are in many British museum collections, including the Victoria and Albert Museum, the Ashmolean Museum, the Fitzwilliam Museum, and the galleries in Aberdeen, Darlington, Eastbourne, Gloucester, Hove and Rochdale, among others. They also appear in the UK art market fairly frequently.
