= Martin Hardie =

Martin Hardie may refer to:

- Martin Hardie (footballer)
- Martin Hardie (artist)
