= James Orrock =

James Orrock RI
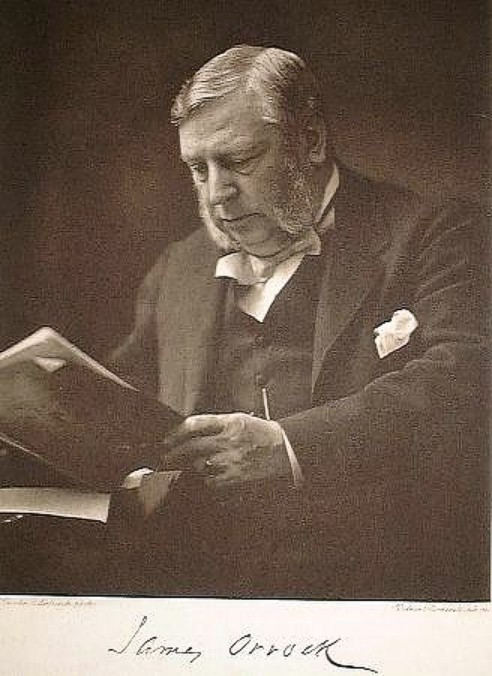
- James Orrock
- Born: 1829; Edinburgh, Scotland
- Died: 10 May 1913 (aged 84); Shepperton, Middlesex, England
- Education: James Ferguson; William L. Leitch; John Burgess
- Known for: Watercolour Landscape
- Awards: Royal Institute of Painters in Watercolours; Royal Scottish Academy; Royal Academy

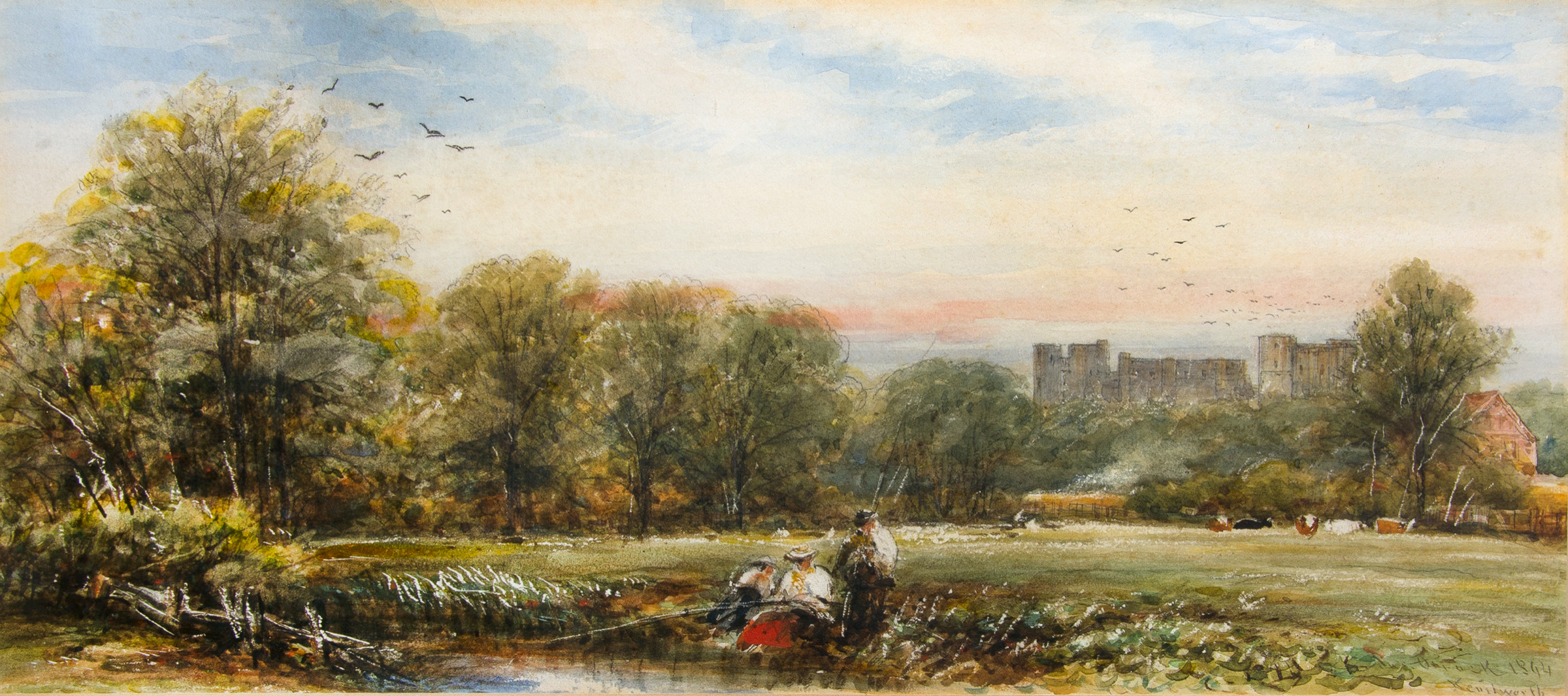
Kenilworth Castle, 1844

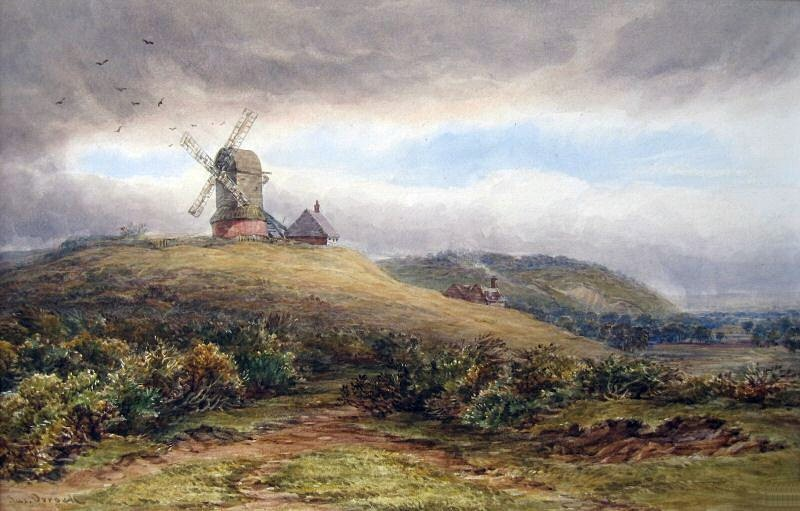
"Storm Approaching", watercolour, c. 1890

James Orrock R.I., R.O.I. (1829 – 10 May 1913), was a prominent Scottish landscape painter, mostly in watercolour, collector and dealer of art and oriental ceramics, author and illustrator. He was also a dentist in Nottingham before 1866 when he moved to London to pursue an artistic career. He collected English paintings of the years around 1800, and was a great admirer and promoter of John Constable and J.M.W. Turner. He was busy as an author and lecturer, becoming a well-known figure, promoting English painting and pushing for its better representation in public collections.

As a painter he was a part of what has been called a "Cox school" within the Royal Institute of Painters in Water Colours, following the traditions of David Cox and Peter De Wint; others in the group were Thomas Collier, E.M. Wimperis, and later Claude Hayes. They continued the broader and naturalistic approach of the earlier masters, rejecting Late Victorian grandiosity and over-precision. They also generally made less use of opaque bodycolour, though here Orrock's practice varied. He often used a good deal of underdrawing in pencil.

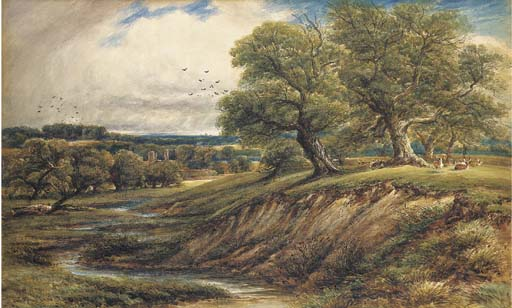
Bradgate Park, Leicestershire, watercolour 1893

His reputation remains clouded by his activities as an art dealer, especially over a number of works he sold as works by John Constable or David Cox which are now regarded as fakes, or at best altered originals. Since Orrock was a painter himself, it was rumoured at one time that he had painted them himself, but this is now not usually thought to have been the case. Whether he was aware that they were fakes, or had even commissioned them, seems now unknowable.

== Life ==
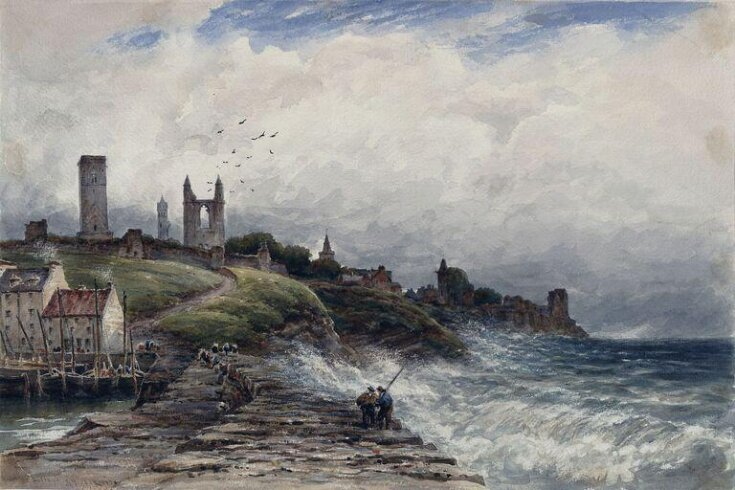
St. Andrews, Fifeshire, watercolour, 1888, V&A Museum

James was the son of James Orrock, an Edinburgh surgeon, dentist and druggist, living at 17 Elm Row at the top of Leith Walk. The family moved to 2 York Place when he was young.

After school at the Irvine Academy, he studied medicine, surgery, and dentistry at Edinburgh University, then continued his studies in Leicester. He married Susan Gould of Leicester in 1853, and in the same year opened a dental practice in Nottingham, which was successful enough for him to begin collecting art. He had already been making sketches, travelling around the Midlands. Orrock studied painting under James Ferguson, in Edinburgh, then J. Burgess in Leicester, and later Thomas Stuart Smith at the Nottingham School of Design, and later, in London William L. Leitch.

He settled in London by 1866, becoming an associate of the Royal Institute of Painters in Water Colours in 1871, then a full member in 1875, after which he often included "R.I." when signing paintings. He also exhibited at the Royal Scottish Academy and Royal Academy. His later style was highly influenced by David Cox, his paintings today are in the collections of various museums and galleries, including the Victoria and Albert Museum.

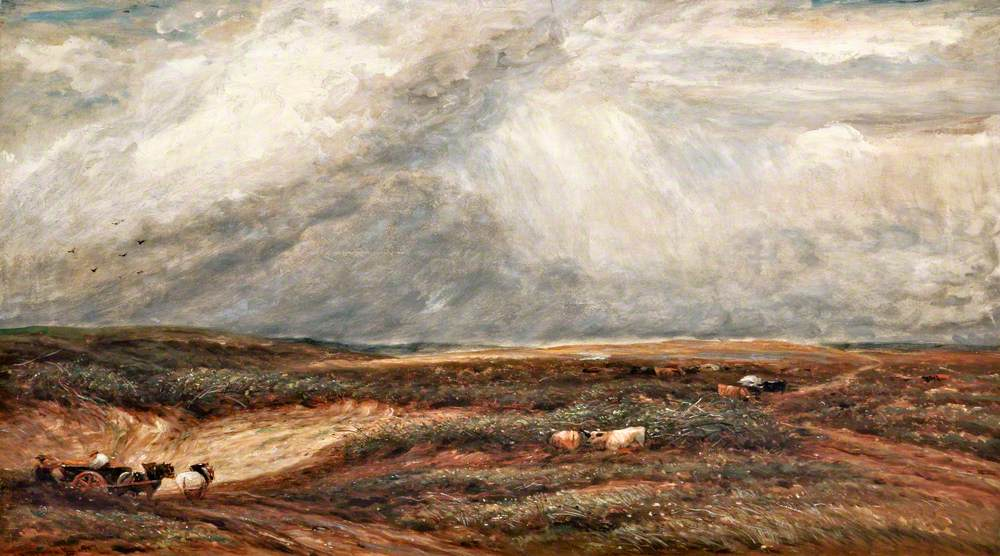
Sandpits, Milford, Surrey, oils, 1907, Lady Lever Art Gallery

A strong advocate of J. M. W. Turner and British art in general, he was also an impassioned collector of Adam-style furniture decorated by Angelica Kauffman. Orrock created art-period rooms in his house, which he opened to the general public.

Late in his career, he illustrated three books, somewhat in the style of Turner: Mary Queen-of-Scots, 1906; Old England : her story mirrored in her scenes, 1908; and, In the Border country, 1906.

== Art collector and dealer ==
Questions over the authenticity of paintings passing through Orrock's hands first came to a head in 1893, when he lent a Constable, then called The Keeper's Cottage, to a major loan exhibition of Old Masters at the Royal Academy of Arts in London. George Dunlop Leslie RA in a review challenged the authenticity of this and another Constable of Salisbury Cathedral, owned by a different collector. A furious row in the press ensued, including a riposte by Orrock full of invective; Orrock began to take legal action, before Leslie withdrew. Ironically, the view of the Lady Lever Art Gallery, where the Keeper's Cottage now is, returned to its original name as Cottage At East Bergholt, is that of the twenty "Constable"s in the museum that came via Orrock, that is the only genuine one. The museum say that it is "now recognised as one of the artist’s finest late works, and particularly revealing about Constable’s vision and method of work".

The leading critic Claude Phillips, reviewing the exhibition, expressed his "wonder that their genuineness should have been called into question in such light-hearted fashion and on such insufficient grounds", while also criticising the "too enthusiastic praise lavished on the Keeper's Cottage by its naturally irate owner, himself a painter of eminence and a recognised authority on all that pertains to English landscape art".

Having on two previous occasions bought furniture and paintings from Orrock's personal collection, on Orrock's death Lord Leverhulme bought most of his art collection, and some one thousand of his own paintings. Part of that collection was used to create the Lady Lever Art Gallery at Port Sunlight.

Orrock is still often suspected of having commissioned many copies and works in the style of John Constable. His association with A Sea Beach, Brighton, a painting by Constable, which may have passed through Orrock's hands, was featured on the BBC One's Fake or Fortune? in January 2014.

It is also considered that two watercolours by David Cox bought by Leverhulme from Orrock were not by Cox.

The scale of his involvement with the art trade and with collectors such as John Ruskin is clear in the two volume book about him by Byron Webber, published in London, by Chatto and Windus in 1903: James Orrock R.I., Painter, Connoisseur, Collector.

Thomas Griffith, Turner's friend and agent/dealer was one of the executors of his estate. The artist gifted a very large early sea peace "Shipwreck, the Rescue" 161 x 222 cm. to Griffith (presumably the documented "Stormy Picture" they had discussed, in need of cleaning and restoring c1844). This sea piece was one of the earliest, if not the first of Turner's monumental sea piece series, c1801-02. He was only 26 at the time and this series made his fame early on. "Shipwreck, the Rescue' passed from Sir J.C. Robinson, surveyor of Queen Victoria's pictures, then to James Orrock.

The British Museum has watercolours by JMW Turner, Copley Fielding and David Cox (one each), all sold by Orrock in his sale at Christie's on 6 June, 1904, where bought (via Agnew's) by George Salting and included in his Salting Bequest in 1910. Orrock donated various paintings, by himself and others, to museums during his lifetime, backing up his activism encouraging better representation of British art.

== Family ==
His brother Hector Heatly Orrock (1831-1862) was a short-lived architect involved in railway station design with Sir Thomas Bouch.
