= Edmund Morison Wimperis =

English painter (1835–1900)

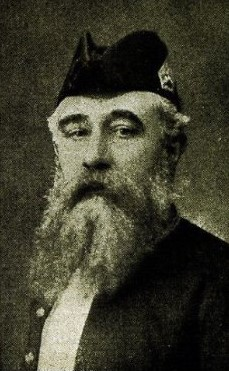
Edmund Morison Wimperis

Edmund Morison Wimperis (6 February 1835, in Flocker's Brook, Chester – 25 December 1900, in Southbourne, Christchurch, Hampshire), was an English landscape painter, mostly in watercolour, and in his earlier career an illustrative wood engraver.

He is remembered for the landscape watercolours, which were his main output for the later part of his career, although in his last years he also painted similar subjects in oils. Campbell Dodgson in the DNB wrote of "the pretty landscapes in the manner of Birket Foster or of David Cox in his tamer moods, by which he is chiefly known. They are neat and finished, but somewhat characterless and old-fashioned in technique".

Martin Hardie in his standard history of Watercolour Painting in Britain is more enthusiastic, saying that he and Claude Hayes "follow[ed] Collier in bringing back to landscape [painting] some of the breadth and grandeur which had been scattered into disunity by some of their predecessors. They were avowed disciples of Collier and they achieved something more than mere imitation." James Orrock is often included in those continuing the tradition of Cox and Collier.

== Life ==
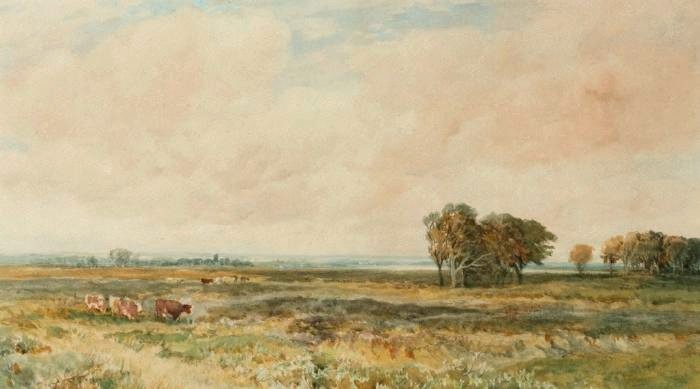
Sandpit Common

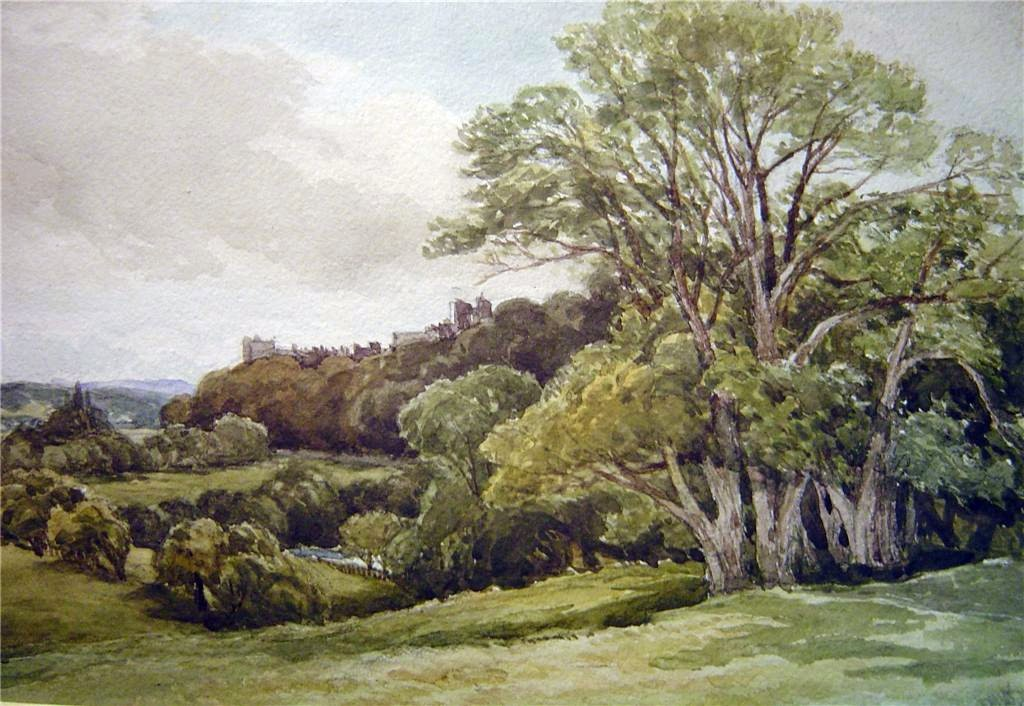
Arundel Castle

He was the eldest son of Mary and Edmund Richard Wimperis. Edmund was a cashier of Messrs. Walker, Parker, & Co.'s lead works at Chester. The members of the family were all artistically talented. They were close friends of Charles Kingsley, the author of Water Babies, who at that time was a canon of Chester Cathedral. Edmund's children were members of the Naturalists Field Club, with Kingsley as the leader. They were also connected by marriage to the Brontës through Maria Branwell, the mother of the famous sisters.

About 1851, Edmund was apprenticed to the wood-engraver Mason Jackson in London for seven years, and also trained under the watercolourist and illustrator Myles Birket Foster. From about 1863, he worked for the publisher Joseph Cundall and for the Illustrated London News. Later in his life, he started to paint and sketch with Thomas Collier.

Hardie distinguishes two periods in his watercolours; in the first "up to about 1870, Wimperis was working in the painstaking way of a man used to stippling, under a magnifying glass, on a boxwood block", that is, as a wood engraver. But "after he came in touch with Collier, his work began to show greater breadth and atmospheric quality". Hardie claims that "he did better work out-of-doors, when treating his subject with directness and sturdy significance of touch, than when he carried drawings to a high degree of finish in his studio."

Like many watercolourists, he was somewhat obsessive about the paper he used, and believed that it matured in storage, so that "he laid down paper, as another man might lay down port, with the feeling that it mellows and matures; as indeed it does." He did not wet and stretch the paper before painting, as some did. In this he followed the practice of Collier. The paper was painted loose, "in a folio with a metal-hinged frame to hold down the paper".

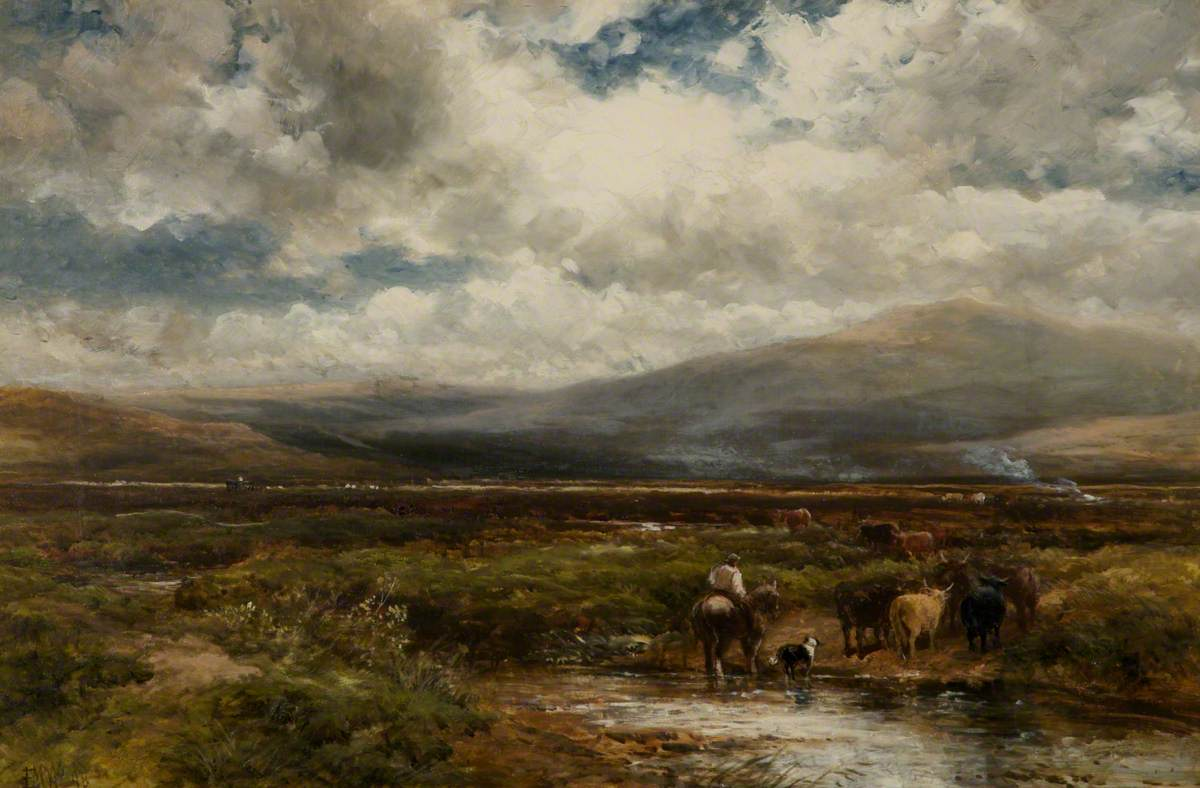
A Scottish Moor, oils, Warrington Museum and Art Gallery

When aged about 38 he became a professional landscape watercolourist and member of the Society of British Artists. In 1874, he joined the Royal Institute of Painters in Water Colours, and went on to become one of its foremost members, being elected vice-president in 1895. He was a member of the Arts Club. In 1879–80, he accompanied his two sisters Fanny and Jenny on a visit to their sister, Susanna, married and living in Dunedin in New Zealand. He stayed for some months, exhibiting at the Otago Art Society in 1880. His two sisters remained in New Zealand, living with their sister.

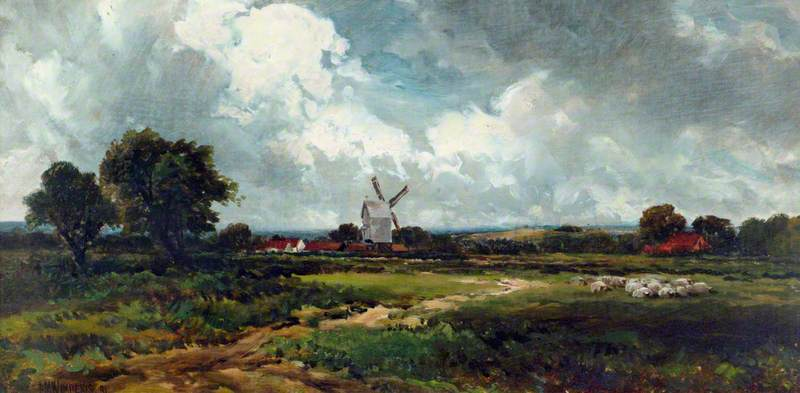
Landscape with a Windmill, 1891, oils, Victoria and Albert Museum

He died at Southbourne, Christchurch, Hampshire, on 25 December 1900; numerous paintings are dated that year.

A collector recorded paying in 1896 (at the dealer Frost and Reed) £8 for a watercolour of 6 1/4 x 9 1/2 inches, and £20 for a larger one, 13 1/4 x 20 inches. He was reasonably prolific, and most British museums with watercolour collections have examples (the Victoria and Albert Museum have at least seven), and his paintings appear frequently for sale. He usually signed, in full as "EM Wimperis", or with his initials "EMW", or a monogram using them, and often dated his works.

== Family ==
On 11 April 1863 he married Anne Harry Edmonds (b. c. 1841 Penzance), daughter of Walter Edmonds of Penzance, whose mother was a cousin of Maria Branwell, and Ann Courtenay Harry of Helston, and raised a family of two sons and two daughters, all of whom were talented artists.

Edmund's siblings were:

- Eleanor Wimperis (b.1836)
- John James Wimperis (b.1839)
- Frances Mary Wimperis, known as Fanny (1840–1925), painter and art teacher in Dunedin, New Zealand
- Susanna White Wimperis (1842–1915), botanical artist in Dunedin, New Zealand
- Ann Jane Wimperis, known as Jenny (1844–1929), painter in Dunedin, New Zealand
- Joseph Price Wimperis (1849–1877)
- Harriet Elizabeth Wimperis (1851–1869)

Edmund's children were:

- Edmund Walter Wimperis (1865–1946), architect and partner in Wimperis Simpson & Guthrie, also, as an amateur, "an ardent and skilful painter in watercolour".
- Arthur Harold Wimperis (1874–1953), illustrator, playwright, lyricist and Academy Award-winning screenwriter, for the adapted script of Mrs. Miniver (1942).
- Ann H Wimperis
- Ethel M Wimperis
