= Factory House =

Building in Porto, Portugal

British Factory House
- Feitoria Inglesa
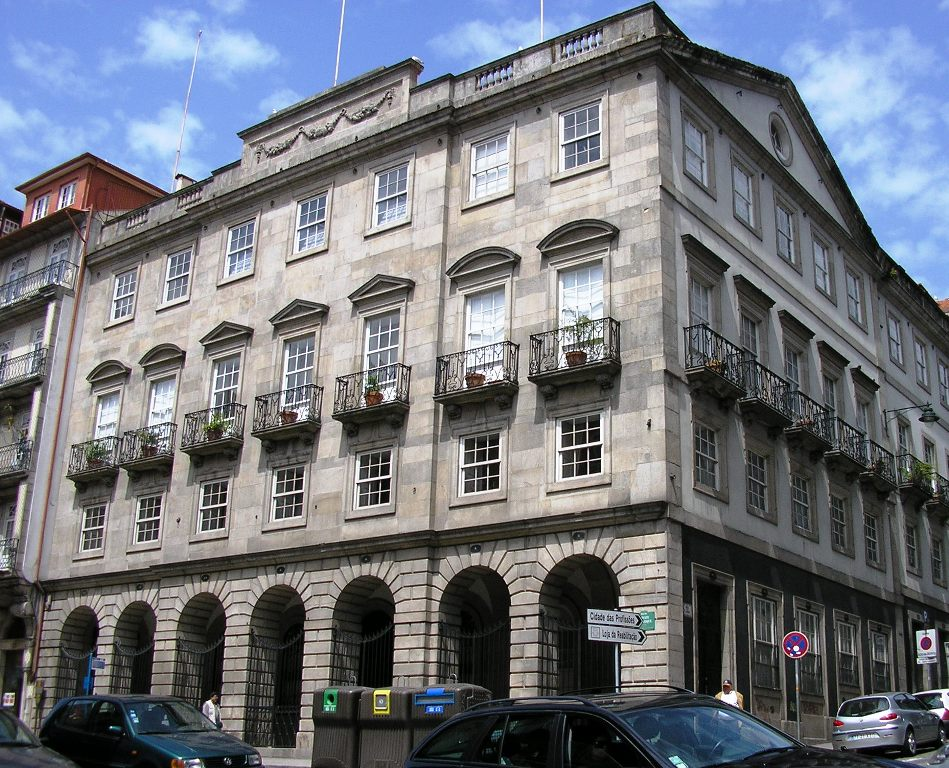
- The front façade of the Feitoria Inglesa along the Avenida Infante D. Henrique, showing the traditional Neo-Palladian designs characteristic of the Neoclassical era
- Interactive map of the British Factory House area

General information
- Type: Factory House
- Architectural style: Neo-Palladian
- Location: Sé, Portugal
- Coordinates: 41°08′29″N 8°36′49″W
- Opened: 1727
- Owner: British Association

Design and construction
- Architect: John Whitehead (1726-1802)

Website
- http://www.portopatrimoniomundial.com/feitoria-inglesa.html

The British Factory House (Portuguese: Feitoria Inglesa), also known as the British Association House, is an 18th-century Neo-Palladian building located in the northern Portuguese centre of Porto, associated with the influence of Britain in the port wine industry.

This building is part of a group of buildings and infrastructure that mark the British presence in the city of Porto, which include the Oporto Cricket and Lawn Tennis Club (founded 1855) and the Oporto British School (1894).

== History ==
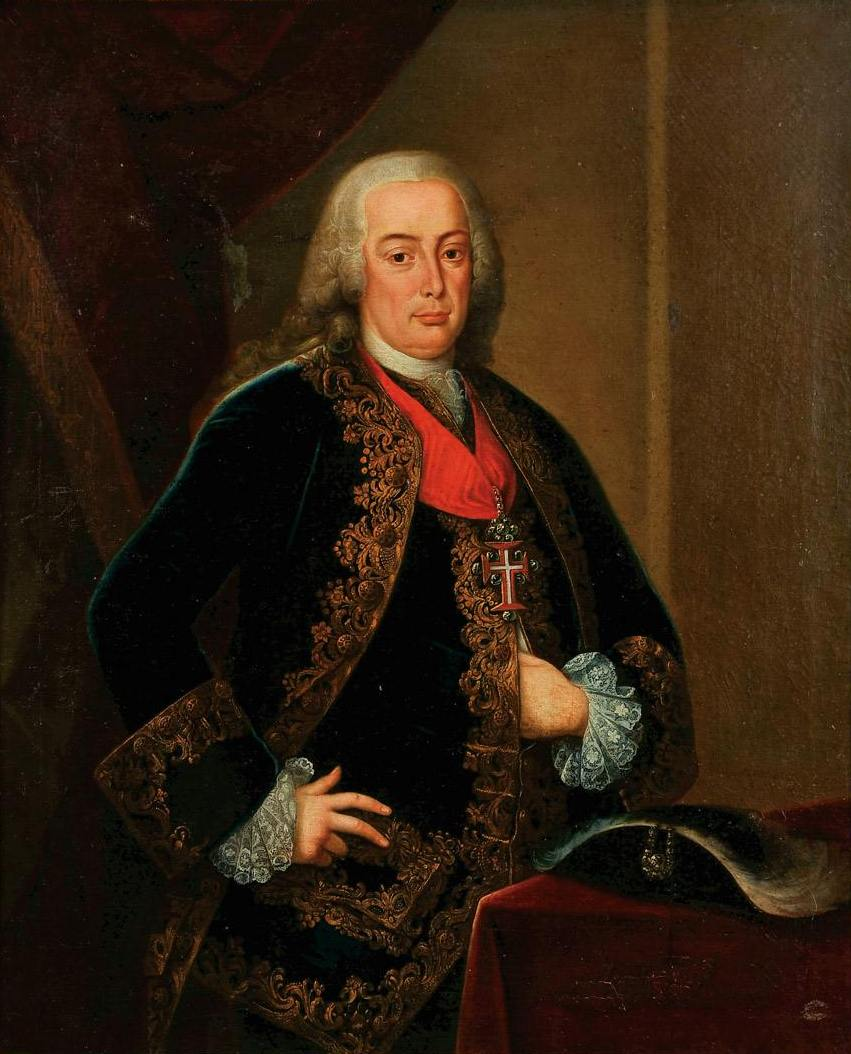
The 1st Marquis of Pombal

The building reflects the 600-year Anglo-Portuguese Alliance, and the importance of the city's British community and its prominent role in the Port trade. The oldest British factory in the north of Portugal, the building dates from the 16th century, when the association was established in Viana do Castelo.

The charter for the first Porto Factory House dates to 1727, where it was located along the Rua Nova dos Ingleses. With the construction of the building occurring between 1785 and 1790, the Club moved to its present location, by the Oporto docks.

The Factory House is one of the last remaining that existed throughout the British, Portuguese and Dutch empires. The building's construction was entirely financed from annual contributions made by British Port merchants that were based in the city. The purpose of the 17th–18th-century factories (chiefly in trading seaports) was to provide a meeting place for foreign merchants, known as factors, to conduct their business and to defend their interests. Conceived as a meeting place for British shippers to discuss business, the house became a private club for the British where they colluded to consolidate their monopoly over the manufacture and export of Port wine.

In 1806, the Portuguese government granted the land upon which the Factory House is built to the British consulate in perpetuity "from this day and forever". With their frequent meetings, the British shippers were able collude together on pricing and strengthened their monopoly over the Port wine trade. All business was conducted in absolute secrecy from the Portuguese.

Over time the Factory House became a symbol of the British monopoly. Complaints about the business practices of the British shippers, leading to the Portuguese Prime Minister Sebastião José de Carvalho e Melo, Marquis of Pombal establishing the Douro Wine Company in 1756, to bring more Portuguese influence and control to the Port wine industry. Among the Douro Wine Company's powers was the ability to set pricing for what the British shippers had to pay the Portuguese wine growers of the Douro. The monopoly of the British factors was essentially over.

The British passed on their increased costs by adding them to the price of their port. The local tavern owners reacted angrily to the price increase which led to the so-called Tipplers' Riots that broke out on 23 February 1757. Riots broke out across the city, prompting Pombal to send 3,000 soldiers to squelch the rioting. Believing the factors were primarily responsible for the riots, Pombal dealt out harsh punishments. Both the British and their sympathizers faced large fines, the confiscation of property and jail time.

During the Napoleonic Wars, the Factory House was temporarily occupied by the French army when the French invaded Portugal in 1807. After the war, it was reopened on 11 November 1811, with a lavish dinner and ball.

Those families of British origin with the strongest ties to the Port trade over the last three centuries are closely linked to the history of the Factory House. The walls on either side of the imposing entrance hall, with its lofty vaulted ceiling supported by impressive granite columns, are decorated with large wooden plaques listing the names of all the treasurers since 1811. Among these can be found some names still closely associated with the great port houses such as Cockburn, Croft, Delaforce, Fladgate, Forrester, Graham, Guimaraens, Robertson, Roope, Sandeman, Symington, Taylor and Warre. By 1814, the building turned into more of a private gentleman's club among the merchants.

During the 19th century, the Factory House developed an air of exclusivity, holding formal balls for the British of Porto and excluding most of the Portuguese shippers who worked in the wine industry. Today, membership is from seven British port companies represented by British directors of member houses. There are twelve full-time members of the house. Other category of membership exist: honorary members, retired members, associate members, and visitors to the lunch room. Other than honorary members, all other members either work, or have worked, for the member companies.

From the early 19th century the Porto Factory House began to serve as meeting-point and for social events. In 1811, the factory adopted its present statutes, under the management of the surviving British port companies, through a body known as The British Association.

By 2014, twelve directors, representing the seven companies of the association, run the Factory House and promote the groups role objectives. The factory's ambassadorial role includes the promotion of port wine, in addition to keeping alive the 200-year-old traditions of the association. The Factory House building is still open and serves as a meeting house for British port shippers.

== British Association ==
The factory is managed on a rotational basis by its members, whose responsibility is to ensure the proper running of the premises and to organize and carry out the annual plan of activities. The president is known as the treasurer, and is appointed for an annual term, aided by a management committee (comprising five people, that includes the preceding treasurer and the succeeding treasurer). The day-to-day running of the factory is entrusted to a manager who ensures its proper functioning and coordinates the activities which take place year round.

Of the centuries-old traditions, there are some that mark the annual calendar of the association:

- The Wednesday Lunch, in the drawing room (where a copy of The Times, dating to 100 years prior to the date of the lunch, is displayed);
- The Treasurers' Dinner, held on the third (or fourth) Friday of November for invited members. The treasurer invites a number of guests, including a guest speaker;
- The annual Christmas Ball, held on the last Saturday evening before Christmas, and attended by the factory's members, their families and invited friends. As many as 200 people gather in the formal ballroom for the party.

In addition, vintage ports are served during the association lunches and dinners, selected by the treasurer from the factory's own underground cellars. There are 15,000 bottles stored in this repository, including classic vintages from the 20th and 21st centuries. The Factory House hosts a weekly Wednesday luncheon where members meet for lunch to discuss the wine industry and business. During these lunches the shippers share various port wines from their collection, including one vintage port that is tasted blind. Guesses are made by the guests as to what vintage the wine is and from which shipper it comes.

== Architecture ==
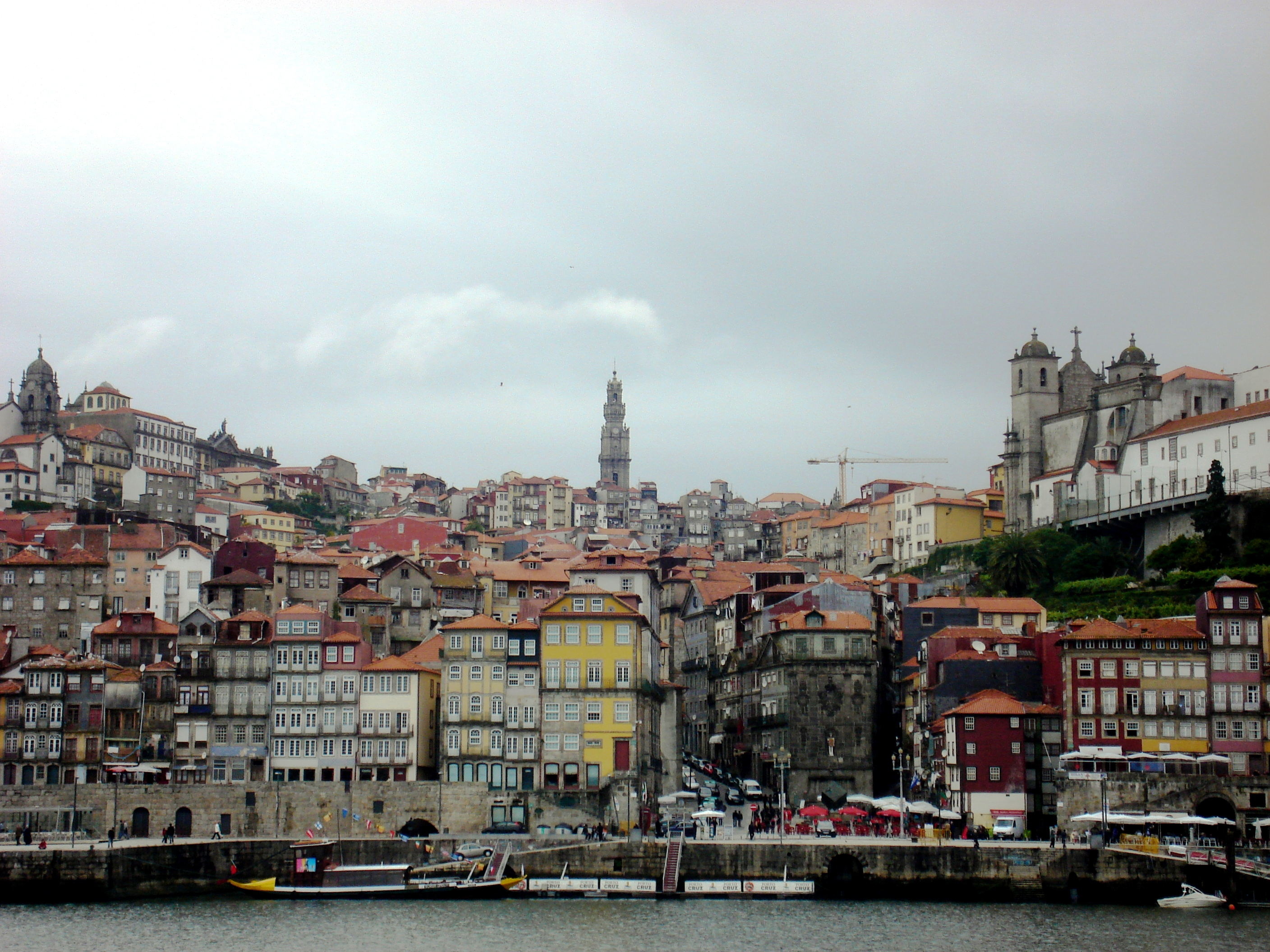
The old quarter of the city of Porto, location of the Factory House

The British Factory House building is located in the old quarter of the city of Porto, situated along the Rua Infante Dom Henrique (which was named for the Portuguese Prince Henry the Navigator).

The design of the building was formalized by British Consul John Whitehead (1726–1802), who was inspired by the Neo-Palladian style of architecture. It consists of four registers, with the main floor of archways and the second floor with high ceilings, windows with verandas and triangular pediments. The third and fourth floors were conceived as mezzanines, featuring smaller, rectangular windows that circle the building.

The Palladian-inspired main façade of the Factory House is austere, due in part to the somber granite used in its construction, at the same time conveying an elegant understatement. There are some decorative elements, which relieve some of the façade's solemnity. These include the slightly advanced central body, whose three central windows have triangular pediments, and the balustrade, that is interrupted by a raised section adorned with three swags of sculpted fruit.

The hall leads on to an open well staircase remarkable for the fact that each step is made from a single piece of granite and the landings are embedded in the wall with no supporting pillars. The staircase is bathed in natural light provided by a very large skylight, directly above it.

Other sections of the building are the ballroom, the dining room, the dessert room, the huge, second-floor kitchen, the map room (with its unique cartographic collection) and the library (with its repository of old books). Other noteworthy features include the Chippendale furniture, fine English porcelains and silverware.

The design of St James' Church, Porto (built in 1818) was based on the ballroom of the Factory House, and the width is identical.
