= Susanna Roope Dockery =

English watercolour painter living in Portugal

- Born: Susanna Roope; 1856; Porto, Portugal
- Died: September 1927 (aged 70–71)
- Occupation: Artist
- Known for: Watercolours of northern Portugal

Susanna Roope Dockery (1856-1927) was an English watercolour painter who lived both in England and in the city of Porto in Portugal. She mainly painted scenes of rural life in Portugal.

== Background ==
Susanna Roope Dockery was born in Porto, the daughter of Cabel Roope, whose family came from Dartmouth in England and Elizabeth Whitaker. He was a partner in Hunt, Roope, Teage and Co., of Porto (or “Oporto” as it was then widely known by the English), which was an important company that both imported salted codfish from Newfoundland and exported wines to the United Kingdom and elsewhere.

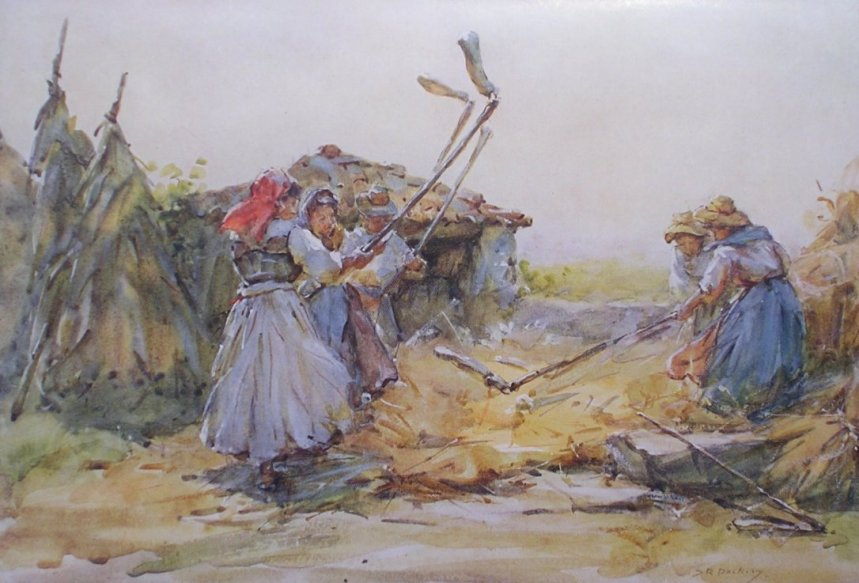
Watercolour of wheat threshing by Susanna Roope Dockery

While marriage between the English families of Porto was common, Roope chose to marry Alfred Victor Dockery, the United States Consul in Porto between 1873 and 1876. He was transferred to Leeds, England, where the couple lived after their marriage in 1878. They had three children. Dockery, who was born in 1851 in North Carolina, came from a prominent family of politicians and plantation owners. He owed his diplomatic career after the American Civil War to the family's support of the Republican Party, the party of Abraham Lincoln, but when the Democrats took over the presidency in 1885 he was forced to return to the USA. He took his family with him, but they returned after six years.

Apparently lacking financial support from her husband, Susanna Roope Dockery became for a time dependent on her extended family and friends. She took up watercolour painting as a profession. Her paintings were of the Porto area and she also took a small cottage at Afife to the north of Porto in what is now the municipality of Viana do Castelo. Many of her works feature the stone buildings and structures of that area and she also painted scenes of rustic life, of fishing boats, and of the grape harvest. Initially she sold her paintings to British people in Porto and some are still to be found in the houses of Anglo-Portuguese families. The favourable reception of her work encouraged her to seek a wider audience and in February 1897 she exhibited "76 Watercolour drawings of North Portugal" at a gallery in London's Mayfair. In 1899 her watercolours of Costumes of Minho and Douro were exhibited in Lisbon and two of the paintings were purchased by the Queen of Portugal. In 1901 she exhibited a painting at the Royal Academy and she continued to exhibit at commercial galleries in London.

Although it is not known for certain, the development of Dockery's painting skills may have been as the result of her visits to her mother's house in Witley in the Surrey Hills to the southwest of London. This village was home to artists such as Myles Birket Foster and Helen Allingham. It is also known that she received some tuition from the Irish artist, Claude Hayes. In 1909, 21 of her paintings were chosen to illustrate a book by William Henry Koebel, entitled Portugal, Its Land and People. The book was reprinted as a reproduction in 2010. An exhibition of her paintings was held in London, timed to coincide with the original publication of the book.

From 1911, Roope Dockery experienced a series of tragedies. In that year both her brothers died and in the following year her elder son succumbed to tuberculosis. Her younger son, who had emigrated to Africa to be a farmer, died in mysterious circumstances a decade later. She received emotional support from friends and from her daughter's family. She died in September 1927 in Porto and is buried in the churchyard of St James' Church, Porto. Together with her sisters, Ellen and Mary, she is commemorated in a stained glass window in the church.
