= Frances Wimperis =

New Zealand artist (1840–1925)

Frances Mary Wimperis (1840 – 19 May 1925) was a New Zealand artist.

== Early life ==
Wimperis was born in Chester, England, in 1840. She was the fourth in a family of eight children born to Mary (née Morison) and Edmund Wimperis. Her father was a school drawing teacher and later a manager at a leadworks. Of her siblings, Edmund, Susanna and Ann (Jenny) also became artists. She and her sisters were members of the Naturalists Field Club, of which Charles Kingsley, of The Water Babies fame, was the leader.

== Adult life ==
Wimperis studied art at the Slade School in London, and exhibited with the Royal Society of British Artists and the Royal Watercolour Society.

Wimperis emigrated to New Zealand in 1880 with her sister Jenny, to join their married sister Susanna. They joined Susanna's household in Mornington, Dunedin, and continued to paint and exhibit. Wimperis' work was shown at the Otago Art Society, the New Zealand Industrial Exhibition in Wellington and the South Seas Exhibition in Dunedin. One of her oil paintings won first prize at the South Seas Exhibition. Her work was also included in the Centennial Exhibition in Wellington in 1940.

Wimperis also became an art teacher, first in a private school and then at Otago Girls' High School from 1891 to 1906. One of her most notable pupils was Ella Spicer, who began exhibiting when she was just 15 years old.

=== Legacy ===
In 2002, the Hocken Library staged an exhibition featuring the work of Wimperis and her two sisters, Susanna and Jenny, and her niece, Susanna's daughter Eleanor Joachim.
