= St James' Church, Porto =

Anglican church in Portugal

Coordinates: 41.15001°N 8.62403°W

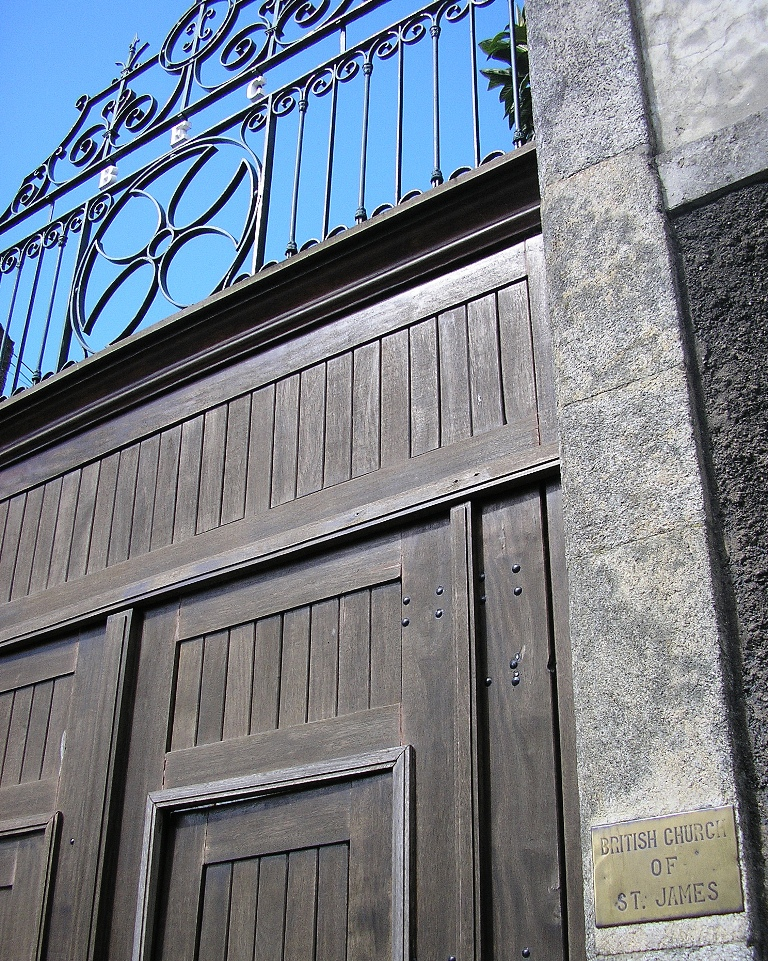
- Gate of the British Church of St James
- St James' Church, Porto
- Location: Largo da Maternidade de Júlio Dinis, 45 Porto
- Country: Portugal
- Denomination: Church of England
- Website: St James's Church, Porto

History
- Dedication: Saint James
- Consecrated: 1843

Architecture
- Architect: Joaquim da Costa Lima Sampaio
- Years built: 1815-1818

Administration
- Province: Canterbury
- Diocese: Europe
- Archdeaconry: Gibraltar
- Parish: Porto

St James' Church is an English-speaking Anglican church in Porto (also known as Oporto), Portugal. It is part of the Diocese in Europe. The church is surrounded by a churchyard, and its history is closely tied with the British merchants of that city.

== Origins ==
British merchants (known as the British Factory) had been resident in Porto (always then known in English as Oporto) for many centuries, since the Treaty of Windsor (1386) between the two countries. The earliest record of a chaplain to the merchants dates from 1671, when a John Brawlerd is noted as the chaplain for four years. Venn records that William Lloyd (later Bishop of Norwich and then a non-juring bishop) was chaplain to the Factory, without dates but, in view of Lloyd's later appointments, must have been prior to 1668. The second definitively recorded chaplain, Dr Samuel Barton, was expelled in 1683, at the behest of the Portuguese Inquisition. The next chaplain, Edward Hind (or Hinde), was similarly expelled, in 1687. After two brief appointments, there was then an almost 20-year period before another chaplain could be appointed. Since then, with the exception of seven years during the Peninsular War, there has been a continuous presence of chaplains.

The erection of a church building and the setting out of a churchyard for Protestant burials, however, were even more contentious than the mere appointment of a chaplain.

== Church building ==
The earliest services were held in merchants' houses; the location appears to have changed from week to week, in order to avoid the attentions of the Inquisition.

By a treaty of 1810 the Portuguese Prince Regent (then exiled, by the Peninsular War, in Brazil) permitted British residents to erect their own churches. This permission was on the proviso that the external appearance was of private dwelling houses and that no bells were rung to announce the services. No steps were taken to erect the church building until 1814. Work finally commenced on 19 June 1815, coincidentally the day after the Battle of Waterloo. The architect was Joaquim da Costa Lima Sampaio, who also designed the palace that is now the Soares dos Reis National Museum. It was designed to mimic the ballroom at the Factory House: its width is identical with the ballroom. The interior stucco work, by António Alves Bezerra, was completed in 1817, and the building as a whole in 1818. The furnishings were typical for the era. The altar was described as a communion table; behind it on the east wall were panels depicting the Lord's Prayer, the Creed and the Ten Commandments; and the pulpit was a triple-decker (clerk's desk, reading desk for the clergyman, and pulpit for the sermon). It was not until 1843 that the church was consecrated.

The original church did not have a gallery; one was erected at the west end in 1847. The church was extended eastwards in 1866-67, including the erection of transepts.

Initially there were pew rents. These were abolished by the British Government in 1865, but the subscriptions (for the same amount as the pew rent that had hitherto been in place) remained as the qualification for attending general meetings. The subscriptions were only finally abolished in 1939, as abolition was one of the conditions imposed by Canon Johnston for accepting the chaplaincy. As late as at least 1982 some pews were still marked with family names, and were reserved for private use.

The windows, originally plain and later frosted, were replaced with coloured glass by R. Morris & Son in 1905. In 1926 it was decided to replace the coloured glass with stained glass by Clayton and Bell, which took place over the following decade. Three windows were installed in 1927 depicting St James the Great, St John the Evangelist and St George, and a further three in 1928 depicting St Paul, St Patrick and St Eunice. A seventh window was installed in 1931 depicting an Angel announcing the Risen Christ and an eighth in 1936 depicting St Luke. The east window was installed earlier, in 1868, following the extension. It was made by James Powell and Sons of London and depicts the Bread of Life and the True Vine.

The churchmanship of St James' was typical of the pre-Oxford Movement era. The Rev Dr Joseph Oldknow was Vicar of the famously High Church Holy Trinity, Bordesely in Birmingham; his successor, Richard Enraght, was so High that he was imprisoned. Oldknow visited Oporto in 1855, and was shocked by what he saw, particularly the presence of British Nonconformists ("Presbyterians, Independents and Wesleyans") in the congregation. The main service at that time was mattins. From 1879 to 1892 Holy Communion was celebrated 14 times a year: on the first Sunday of each month, and Ascension Day, Whitsunday, Trinity Sunday and Christmas Day, but not, apparently, Easter Day, despite the Book of Common Prayer exhortation.

An early service of Holy Communion (a High Church introduction) commenced on a monthly basis in 1890, and, by 1931, had become weekly. Other High Church introductions in 1931 included a surpliced choir and two candlesticks on the altar, to accompany the cross that had been placed there in 1906.

An organ was installed in the church at the time of its construction. That original organ, of which nothing more is known than it was 'small', was located to the south side of the communion table. It was moved to the newly built gallery in 1847. That first organ was replaced in 1868 by a rebuilt organ, purchased from J. W. Walker & Sons Ltd of London. The Walker organ was a two-manual seven-stop instrument.

In turn, the Walker organ was replaced in 1890 by a new organ built by Norman and Beard of Norwich. Both it and its predecessor were powered by water, necessitating a large well and tank behind the church. The climate was challenging for the organ, and in 1893, after just three years, it needed a complete overhaul. In 1910 the water-power was replaced with a petrol motor and in 1932 finally converted to electricity. The organ was reconditioned in 1921 by William Hill & Son & Norman & Beard Ltd. (as Norman and Beard had by then become) with a pneumatic system. That restoration was undertaken as a war memorial. Further work took place in 1937, resulting in a two-manual 29-stop instrument. To celebrate the rebuild, a violoncello and organ recital was given early in 1938 by the Portuguese cellist Guilhermina Suggia and the organist Cyril Langley Salmons. Further restoration work was undertaken in 1957, but in 1974 it was decided to scrap the pipe organ, and replace it with an electronic instrument, purchased from Heyliger's of the Netherlands.

The building is listed as Imóvel com Interesse Patrimonial by the City Council of Porto under the reference M100.

== Church hall ==
There is a church hall, called the Well House.

== Churchyard ==
There is some historic record of an early cemetery for Protestants in Oporto, but this was suppressed by the Inquisition by at least 1719, and no evidence of it remains, nor any certainty of its exact location. From 1719, decent burials were denied to 'heretics', and Protestant burials had to be carried out at low tide on the shore of the River Douro. The insult was intentional: Portuguese burial tradition at the time was within church buildings and burial in the open air was regarded as degrading. By the late 18th century the attitude of the Portuguese authorities had moderated sufficiently to allow the British merchants to acquire land for a cemetery. It took some time for land to be identified and then acquired, but it eventually took place in 1787. The first recorded burial was in 1788. The first gravestone was erected in 1798, on the grave of Thomas Stafford, the father of the then chaplain, Conway Stafford. By this time there had been over a hundred burials. A wall was erected around the churchyard, some years before the church itself was built. By at least 1814, a mortuary (referred to as the 'Deposit House') had been established in the churchyard. When the church was enlarged in 1866 the mortuary was demolished and relocated. Coloured windows were installed in 1935, out of the glass removed from the church.

The centrepiece of the churchyard is a memorial, in the form of an urn, to the Consul, John Whitehead, who died in 1802, although the memorial was not erected until 1820. It had been Whitehead who had been instrumental in securing the churchyard for the British community. Adjacent to the Whitehead memorial are 11 war graves from the Second World War. There is a war memorial in the churchyard, located outside the west door to the church, which commemorates those who fought from the British community during both world wars.

Notable burials include Charles Birdwood, Vice-Consul, Oporto (d 1957), John Delaforce CBE, port wine producer (for Delaforce, acquired by Taylor Fladgate in 2001) and historian of the Porto British community, and Alfred Wilby Tait, Baron de Soutellinho, port wine merchant. There is also a memorial to Joseph Forrester, Baron de Forrester, port wine shipper (1809-61), who drowned and whose body was never found. Susanna Roope Dockery (1856-1927), watercolour painter, is buried there.

== Community ==
The church has been long-associated with the port wine trade. All of the names of the merchants who signed a resolution in 1815 to draw up a plan for the chapel were connected with port wine. At morning tea after Sunday service, along with coffee, white port is served.

== Church records ==
The church records, dating from 1717, are held at the London Metropolitan Archives. These include 18th-century baptismal entries for slaves, transported from the Carolinas.

== Chaplains ==
The chaplains were originally appointed to the British Factory. As a result of the Church Establishment Act 1825, they were then styled Consular Chaplains. The title was changed again in 1875, when British Government funding was withdrawn, to the Chaplain to the British Church of St James.

- William Lloyd, dates unknown but prior to 1668.
- John Brawlerd, 1671-75
- Samuel Barton, 1682-83
- Edward Hind (or Hinde), 1683-87
- Peter Smith, 1689-91
- John Colbatch, 1691. Colbatch was Chaplain at St George's Church, Lisbon, 1688-98 and appears to have been briefly also licensed to Oporto. He was subsequently Knightbridge Professor of Philosophy at Cambridge.
- Henry Stephens, 1709-14
- John Bridgen, 1714
- Daniel Primrose, 1716-20
- Henry Pakenham, 1723-25. Pakenham was the son of Sir Thomas Pakenam, an Irish MP.
- John Smith, 1729-31
- John Nicols, 1731-56
- Henry Wood, 1757-68
- William Emmanuel Page, 1769-76
- Herbert Hill, 1778-82. Hill was the uncle of the poet Robert Southey.
- John Bell, 1783-98
- Conway Stafford, 1798-1805
- Thomas Marler, 1806-07

There was then an interregnum during the Peninsular War.

- Richard Pennell, 1814-24
- Edward Whiteley, 1825-71
- Robert Burton Leach, 1871-78
- Thomas Stedman Polehampton, 1878-99

From 1899-1939 the chaplains were also the headmasters of the Oporto British School.

- William Slyman Picken, 1899-1905. Picken arrived in Oporto in 1894 to become the first headmaster of the Oporto British School.
- Henry D’Albertanson MBE, 1905-30. After leaving Oporto, D’Albertanson was a chaplain in France. During the War he remained in post in Beaulieu-sur-Mer, as the only English clergyman on the Côte d’Azur.
- John Grant Richardson, 1930-39
- George Frederick Johnston 1939-56
- James Cartman, 1957-59
- Kenneth Frank Bray, 1959-70
- Robert James Holmes, 1971-74
- Alexander Eric Lionel Edward Noble, 1975-77
- Roger Vaughan Hodgson, 1978-81
- John Watson Joseph Denham Galbraith, 1981-85
- Wallace Lionel Roberts, 1986-89
- Douglas Ward-Boddington MBE, 1989-97
- Howell Crawford Sasser, 1997-2005 Sasser was also Archdeacon of Gibraltar, 2002-05.
- Manuel Sumares, 2005-12
- Peter Ford OGS, 2013
- Robert John Bates, 2014-15
- Philip John Bourne, 2018-21
