= Jenny Wimperis =

New Zealand watercolourist (1844–1929)

Ann Jane "Jenny" Wimperis (1844 – 20 June 1929) was a British-born New Zealand watercolourist.

== Early life ==
Wimperis was born in Chester, England, in 1844. She was the fifth in a family of eight children born to Mary (née Morison) and Edmund Wimperis. Her father was a school drawing teacher and later a manager at a leadworks. Of her siblings, Edmund, Susanna and Frances (Fanny) also became artists. She and her sisters were members of the Naturalists Field Club, of which Charles Kingsley, of The Water Babies fame, was the leader.

Wimperis studied art in Antwerp and Hanover and exhibited in London with the Royal Society of British Artists between 1868 and 1875.

== Career ==
Wimperis emigrated to New Zealand in 1880 with her sister Fanny to join their married sister Susanna. They joined Susanna's household in Mornington, Dunedin, and continued to paint and exhibit. Wimperis joined the newly formed Otago Art Society and exhibited there, and also joined the Art Club, a small group of artists who met in private homes to discuss art and paint together. The leader of the Art Club was local solicitor William Hodgkins and in 1892 Wimperis gave Hodgkins' daughter, Frances, private art lessons. Frances Hodgkins went on to become one of New Zealand's most influential and highly regarded painters. In 1895 Wimperis also joined a painters' group led by visiting Italian artist Girolamo Nerli, called the Easel Club.

Wimperis specialised in landscapes, the New Zealand bush and boats. Her paintings of the New Zealand bush have been noted for their unromanticised, raw views. She also painted a number of scenes in and around Dunedin. Her paintings were included in the 1889 New Zealand South Seas Exhibition, shown in Melbourne at the Centennial International Exhibition, and also exhibited in Wellington, Auckland and Christchurch.

In 1905, at the age of 61, Wimperis travelled to Europe on a sketching and painting trip. In 1906 she encountered Hodgkins, who was also travelling and painting in Europe, in Venice. Hodgkins wrote to her mother that she had found Wimperis living alone, miserable and helpless, and had recommended she move into a small hotel. Hodgkins then moved on to Chioggia; however, Wimperis followed her there and told Hodgkins that she planned to stay as long as Hodgkins did. Hodgkins' biographer, Eric H. McCormick, later described this experience with Wimperis as a watershed in Hodgkins' attitude to artists from her home town - where previously Hodgkins had been proud of her origins, she subsequently became wary of old friends and acquaintances.

When World War I broke out in 1914 Wimperis returned to Dunedin, and in 1916 moved back to England and lived in Surrey until her death on 20 June 1929.

=== Legacy ===
Wimperis' art is held in the Christchurch Art Gallery collection, the Hocken Library and the Dunedin Public Art Gallery.

In 2002, the Hocken Library staged an exhibition featuring the work of Wimperis and her two sisters, Susanna and Fanny, and her niece, Susanna's daughter Eleanor Joachim.
