= Howell Sasser =

Episcopalian priest and Archdeacon

Howell Crawford Sasser (born 1937) is an Episcopalian priest who was Archdeacon of Gibraltar from 2002 to 2005.

Ney was educated at Maryland University. He was ordained Deacon in 1977; and Priest in 1978. He served in Germany (1977–80), Somalia (1980–83), Cyprus (1984–92), Switzerland (1992-97) and St James' Church, Porto, Portugal (1997-2005).
