= Susanna Wimperis =

New Zealand artist

Susanna White Wimperis (married name Susanna Joachim, 1842 – 3 February 1915) was a New Zealand artist.

== Early life ==
Wimperis was born in Chester, England, in 1842. She was fifth in a family of eight children born to Mary (née Morison) and Edmund Wimperis. Her father was a school drawing teacher and later a manager at a leadworks. Of her siblings, Edmund, Frances (Fanny) and Ann (Jenny) also became artists. She and her sisters were members of the Naturalists Field Club, of which Charles Kingsley, of The Water Babies fame, was the leader.

== Adult life ==
Wimperis specialised in botanical art, and exhibited with the Royal Society of Arts between 1868 and 1871.

Wimperis emigrated to New Zealand in 1876 with her husband George Joachim and their two children, Eleanor and George. She continued to paint in New Zealand, expanding into landscapes and portraiture. She painted many scenes of the West Coast of the South Island, and of Karitane, near Dunedin. A large number of her works are held by the Hocken Collections, Dunedin.

=== Legacy ===
In 2002, the Hocken Library (now known as Hocken Collections) staged an exhibition featuring the work of Wimperis and her two sisters, Fanny and Jenny, and her daughter Eleanor.
