= Eleanor Joachim =

New Zealand bookbinder

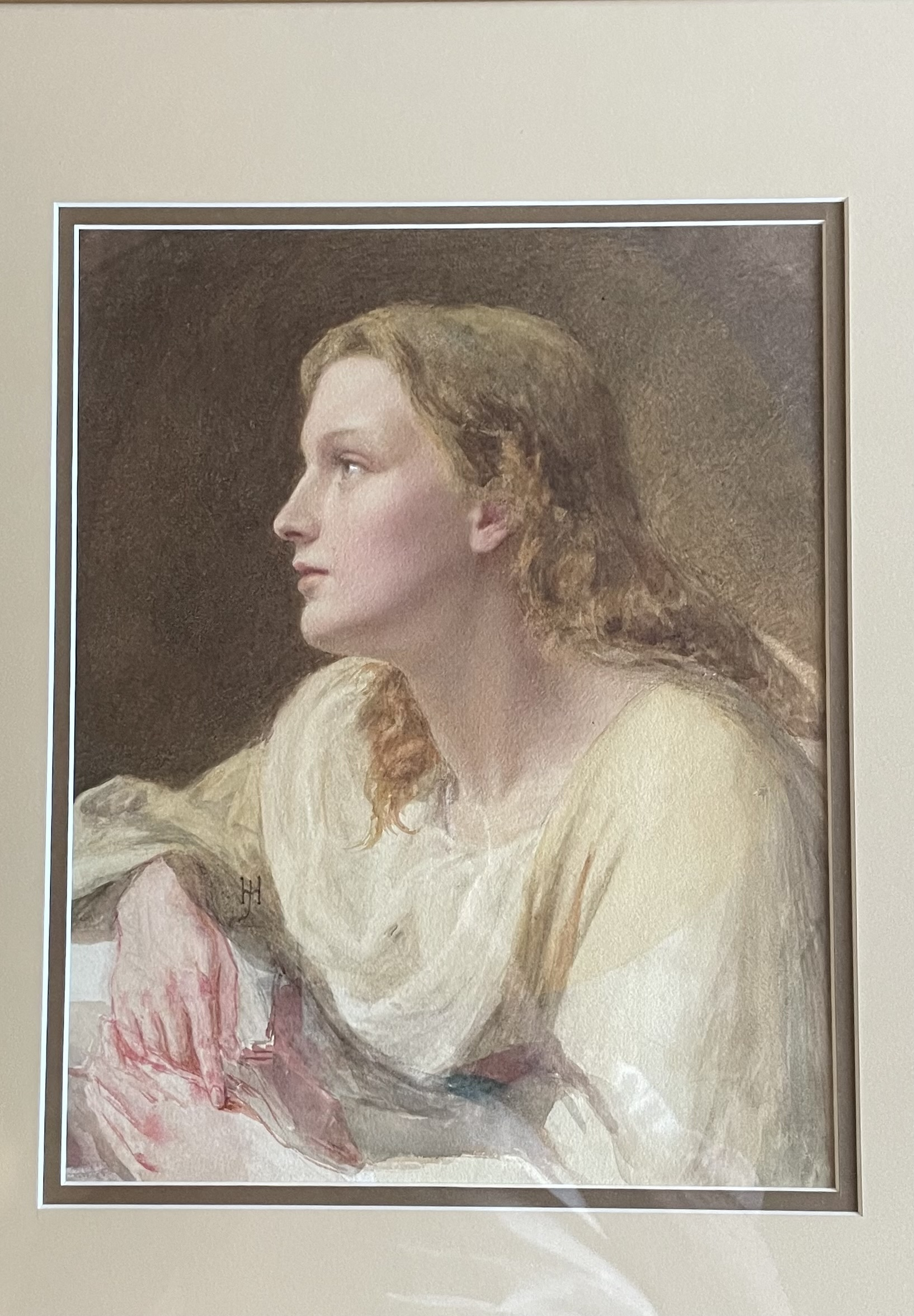
Portrait study of Mary Eleanor Joachim by Sir Hubert von Herkomer, c. 1890s.

Mary Eleanor Joachim (1874–1957) was a New Zealand book-binder in the Arts and Crafts tradition.

== Early life ==
Joachim was born in Littlehampton, Sussex, England, to Susanna Wimperis and George Joachim. The family emigrated to New Zealand in 1876 and settled in Mornington, Dunedin. Joachim was educated at home and then in 1892 and 1893 attended Otago Girls' High School. She then travelled to Hanover and Paris for language study. Joachim's home life was richly artistic - in addition to her mother being a painter, her two artist aunts, Fanny and Jenny, also lived in the household.

== Adult life ==
In 1903, Joachim travelled to London to learn book-binding, tooling and gilding from leading craftspeople of the time, Francis Sangorski and George Sutcliffe. She returned to Dunedin the following year and set up business in the city. She worked on commissioned projects and for exhibitions, and her work was noted for her use of gold tooling and blind tooling. Some of her most significant works were the binding of a book to present to Queen Alexandra in 1906, and the binding and decoration of an illuminated address presented by the city of Dunedin to the Prime Minister Sir Joseph Ward in 1908.

Joachim exhibited at the Otago Arts Society, the New Zealand Academy of Fine Arts in Wellington, and with the Auckland Arts and Crafts Club exhibition. She also exhibited her work in Melbourne at the First Australian Exhibition of Women's Work of 1907, where she won a silver medal and a special prize.

In 1908, Joachim and her aunt Fanny Wimperis unsuccessfully attempted to establish a retail business in Dunedin for Liberty's of London.

=== Legacy ===
During her lifetime, Joachim donated ceramics to the Dunedin Public Art Gallery and embroidery by William Morris to the Otago Museum. On her death, further donations were made to the Dunedin Public Art Gallery.

Examples of Joachim's work are held by the Dunedin Public Library, the Theomin Gallery at the historic home Olveston and the Hocken Collections.

In 2002, the Hocken Library (now known as the Hocken Collections) staged an exhibition featuring the work of Joachim, her mother Susanna, and her two aunts, Fanny and Jenny.
