= Oporto British School =

Location
- Rua da Cerca 338; Porto, 4150-201; Portugal
- Coordinates: 41.1527074°N 8.674045400000068°W

Information
- Type: Independent day school International school
- Established: 1894
- Headmaster: Nick Sellers
- Gender: Coeducational
- Age: 3 to 18
- Enrolment: 558 (2022)
- Website: www.obs.edu.pt

Oporto British School (OBS) is a British school established in 1894 in Foz do Douro, Porto, Portugal. It is the oldest British school in mainland Europe.

It is a private, day school for both boys and girls, aged 3 to 18, with 558 pupils on roll. It follows a British curriculum until the completion of the IGCSE.

Senior pupils then study the IB Diploma Programme and many go on to higher education in the UK, Portugal, and other locations around the world.

== Accreditation ==
OBS received accreditation by the Council of International Schools in 2005. It is a member of the European Council of International Schools and the Council of British International Schools.

== Houses ==
OBS has three houses named after prominent royal houses:

- House of Windsor
- House of Braganza
- House of Lancaster

== History ==
The Oporto British School opened in 1894 with 11 boys, with the Rev WS Picken MA as the Master. The School house, in the Porto suburb Foz do Douro, was rented at the time but was purchased in 1922 and remains part of the school's facilities. Non-British boys were accepted in 1902, and girls in 1914. Pupil numbers remained small, and it was not until well after the Second World War that the roll exceeded 100.

Picken became Chaplain of St James' Church, Porto in 1899, and the chaplains of the church were headmasters of the school until 1939.

The school, founded as a Prep School, continued as such until the mid-1950s, when some pupils remained to take their GCE examinations. The early 1960s saw a further development in provision for Portuguese pupils, as the school ensured that, in addition to following an English curriculum, a parallel course in Portuguese was also followed.

Growing pupil numbers through the 1970s and into the 1980s meant that a significant building programme was required to provide the accommodation and facilities for in excess of 200 pupils. A curriculum for post-IGCSE pupils was developed in the early 1990s with the provision of courses leading to the award of the International Baccalaureate Diploma Programme. By this time, the proportion of pupils from a Portuguese background exceeded that of all others, including British students. This trend continued, and there are in excess of 550 pupils in the school, 50% of whom are from Portuguese families, 10% are British, and 40% from other backgrounds.

Along with recent growth in pupils numbers has been significant curriculum and campus development. The school achieved fully accredited status by the Council of International Schools.

== Location ==
The school is in the suburb of Foz do Douro in Rua da Cerca, Porto, Portugal.
