= Holborn Library =

Coordinates: 51.5210°N 0.1155°W

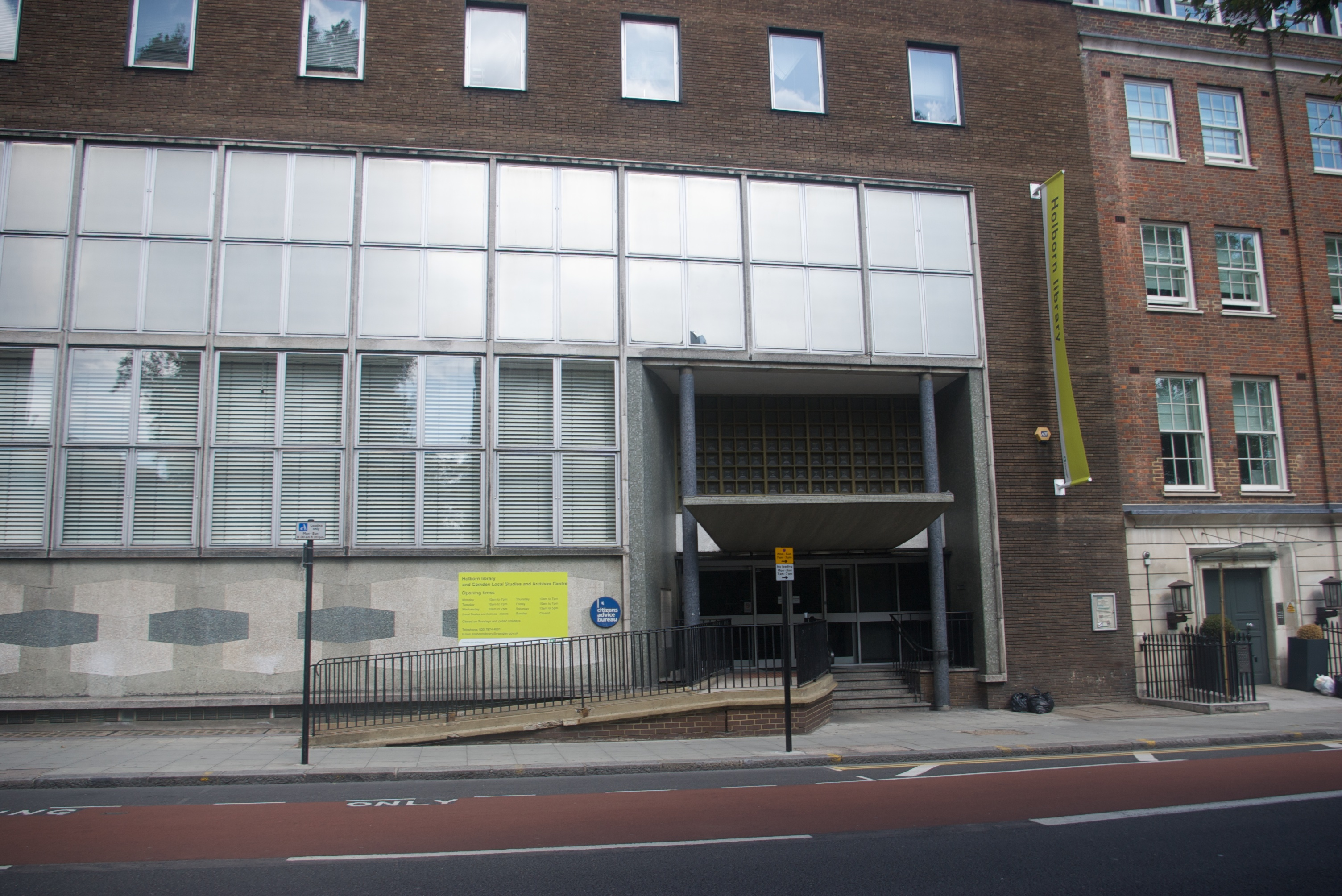
- Holborn Library in 2010

General information
- Location: London, WC1; United Kingdom
- Completed: 1960

Design and construction
- Architect(s): Ernest Ives and assistants I D Aylott and E L Ansell, in close collaboration with Borough Librarian J Swift
- Main contractor: Holborn Borough Council Architects' Department

Holborn Library is a public library in Theobalds Road, Holborn, in the London Borough of Camden.

The library is operated by the Camden London Borough Council and also houses the Local Studies and Archives Centre for the borough.

The Twentieth Century Society describe it as "a milestone in the history of the modern public library".
