= Claude Hayes (artist) =

British landscape painter (1852–1922)

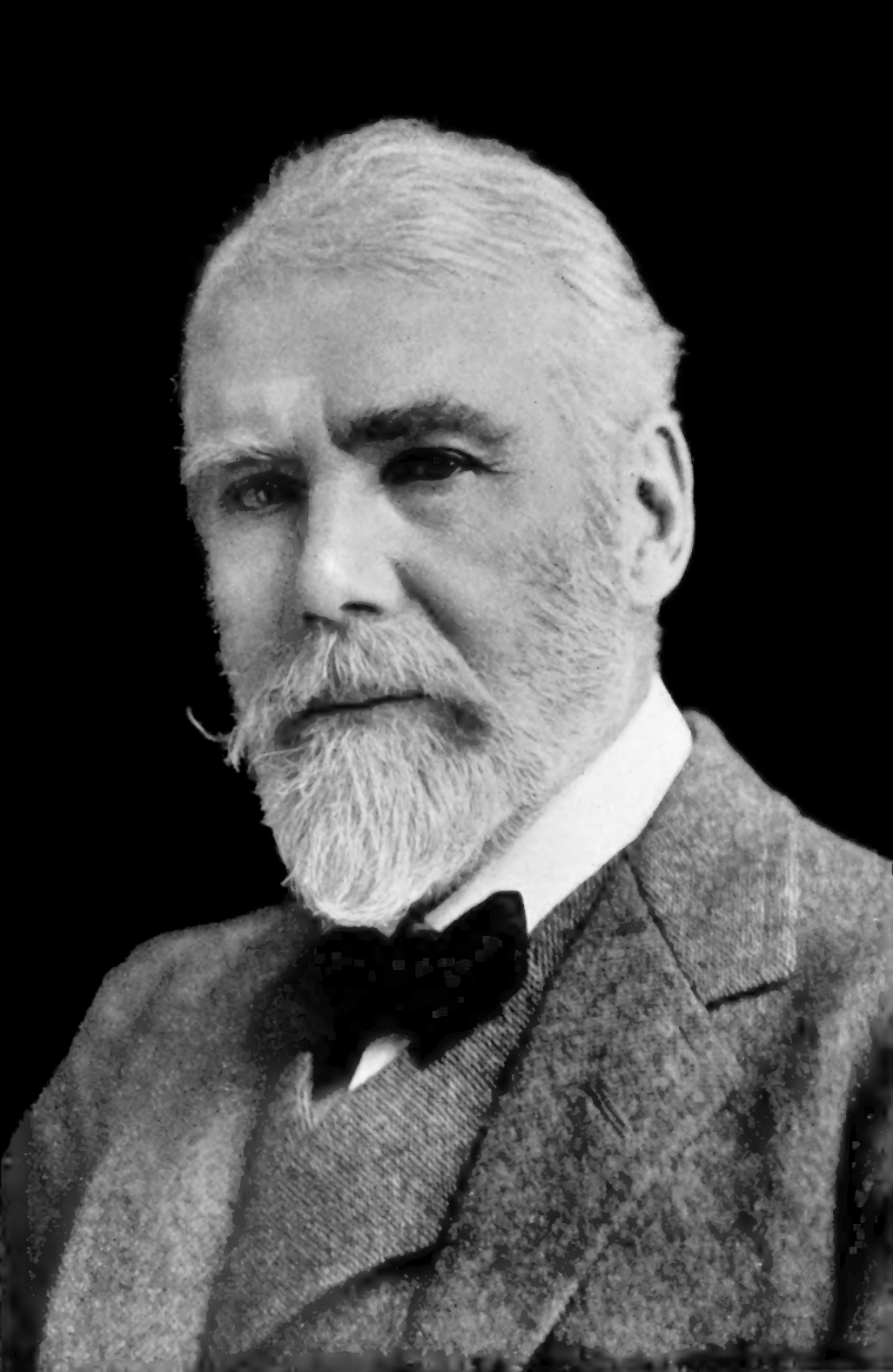
- Born: 1852; Dublin, Ireland
- Died: 25 January 1922 (aged 69–70); Brockenhurst, Hampshire, England
- Occupation: Artist
- Known for: Watercolours and oil paintings

Claude Hayes RI (1852 – 25 January 1922) was a British and Irish artist who specialised in landscape painting; he is especially remembered for his landscape watercolours, though he also painted many oils in the earlier part of his career.

Many of his oil paintings were of wintry scenes, whereas in watercolours he turned more to "open spaces with large expanses of sky and distance", which remained typical of his art throughout his life. He tended to concentrate on flat country, preferring English scenery. Animals and people were often included, but at a relatively small scale. His friend Martin Hardie praises especially his "power of following broken ground into receding distance with able indication of form and colour values", and "his transparent use of fresh and untroubled colour", noting a "kinship with the Impressionists" in a work of 1912.

A review in the Glasgow Herald of the 1894 RI show in London said Hayes "has made an especial study of sky effects, of rolling storm-clouds, of clearing, drifting clouds, showing the quiet blue behind; and of oncoming rainstorm; and his drawings form one of the chief interests of the first room".

Hayes was extremely prolific over a long period, and his paintings are therefore still fairly common on the art market, and relatively cheap. Their quality and style are not consistent, and critics have disgreed as to whether late works, painted when his health had become poor, are hurried and weak, or show a deliberate change in style.

== Early life ==
Hayes was born in Dublin, Ireland, in 1852, shortly before his parents moved to London (his father had been born in Bristol). He inherited his artistic talent from his father, Edwin Hayes, RI, who was a distinguished marine painter. Claude Hayes was determined to follow in his father's footsteps and was always practising drawing. However, his father wanted him to follow a business career and did not encourage his artistic endeavours. He sent his son to a private school in Loughborough, England. After school Hayes ran away to sea rather than follow his father's wishes. He is likely to have sailed initially as an apprentice, but was later onboard the Golden Fleece, one of the transport ships used in the 1867–8 British expedition to Abyssinia, which was commanded by Sir Robert Napier.

While at sea, he made sketches, which he sent home. This led his father, apparently for the first time, to recognise his son's talent. By this time, however, Hayes had made his way to the USA, taking odd jobs whenever he could find them and gradually making his way westward, apparently intending to become a cowboy. He worked at various jobs, supplemented by money by portraits in charcoal or pencil. After about one year he returned to London and studied at the Heatherley School of Fine Art before entering the Royal Academy Schools, where he completed the three-year course. In 1876, one of his oil paintings, entitled Landscape with Figure, was accepted for the Royal Academy Summer Exhibition. From that time until two years before his death, he was represented at the Exhibition every year, with the exception of two, when he did not submit a contribution, exhibiting a total of 82 works. After finishing his course at the Royal Academy Schools, he, like several Irish painters, studied in Antwerp, under Charles Verlat.

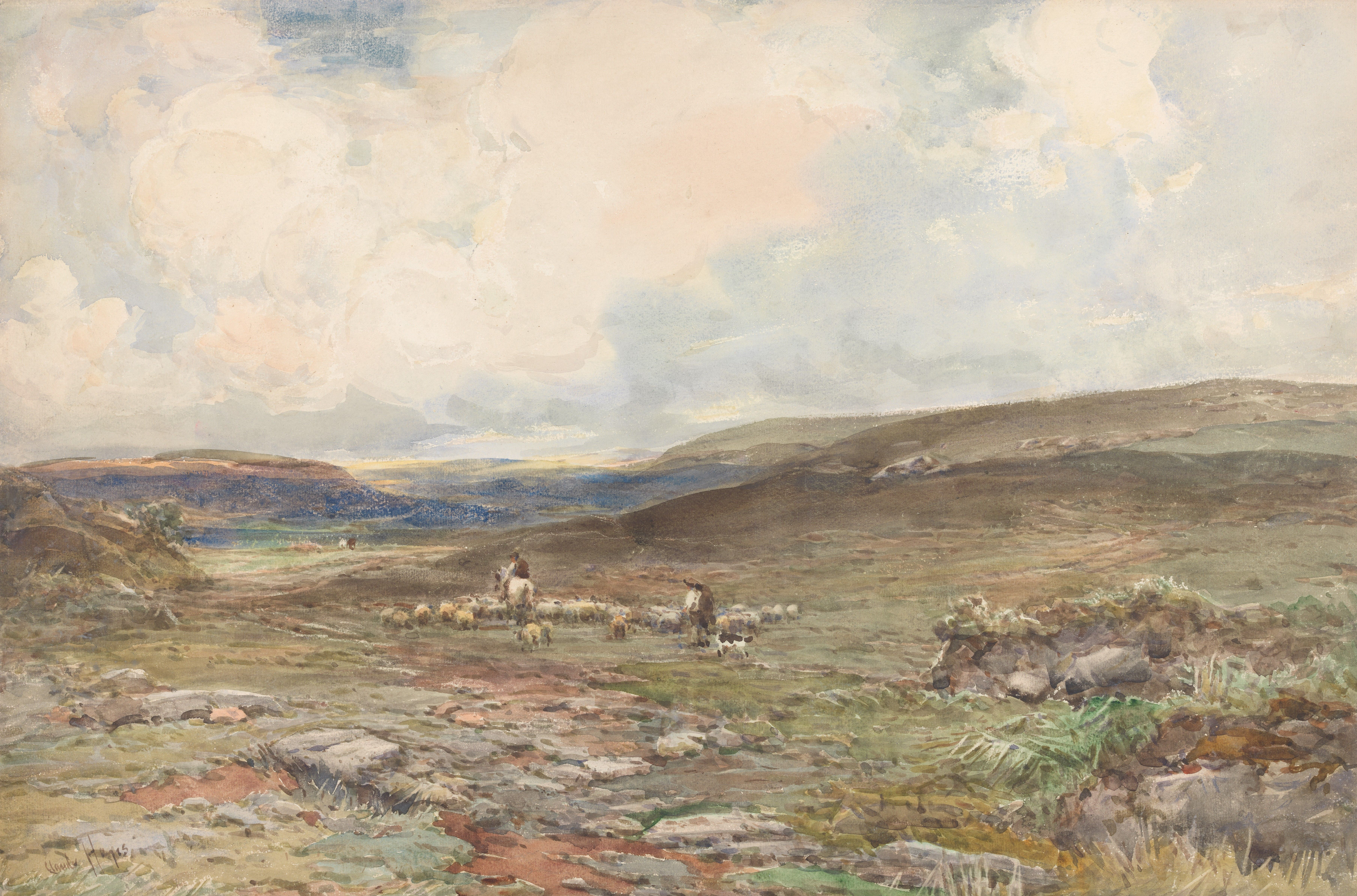
Moorland with Sheep and Shepherd, inscribed on back " "Near Ponty Point, N. Wales, Price 50 guineas", 49.2 × 74.3 cm, Yale Center for British Art.

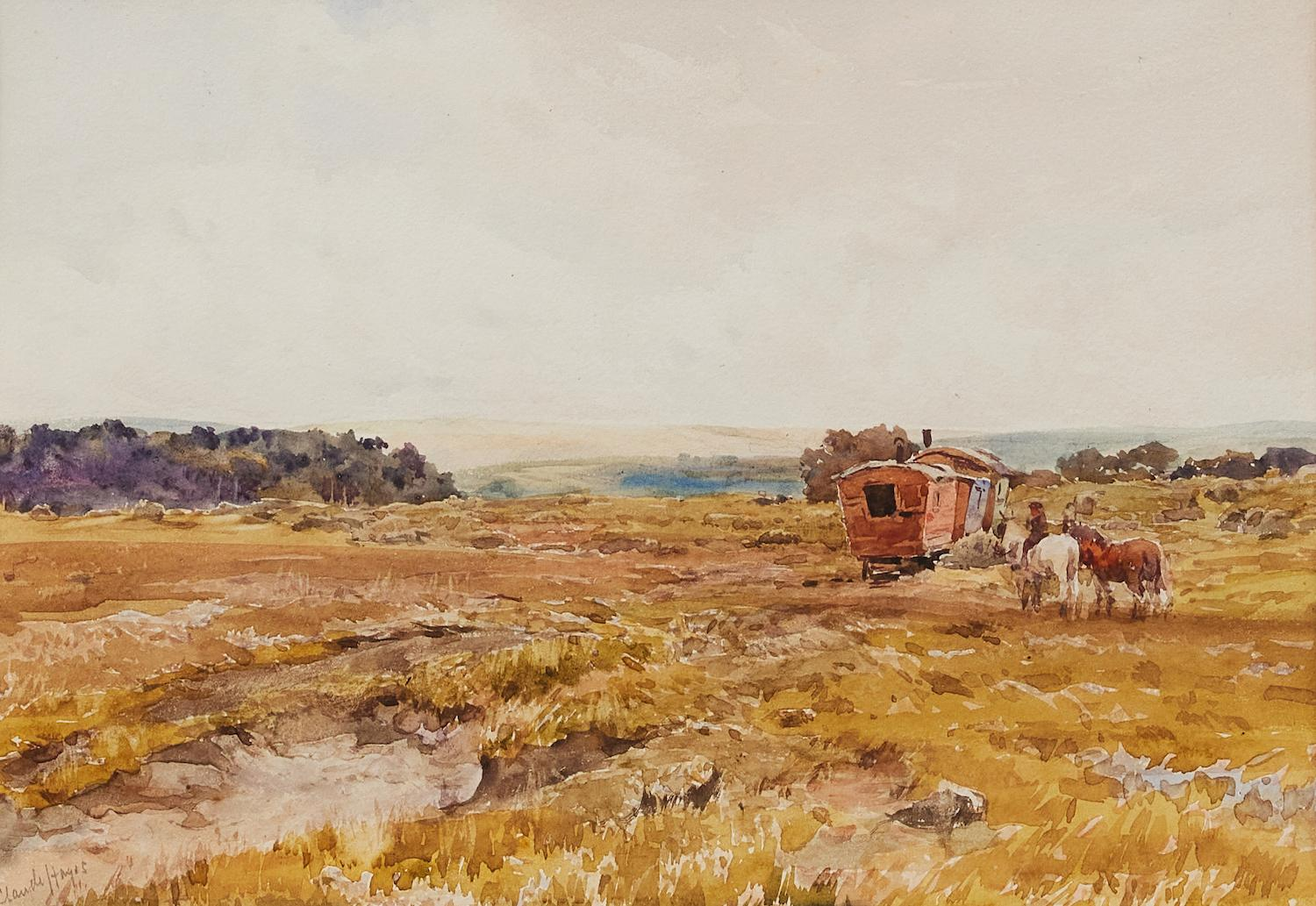
A typical landscape watercolour

== Career ==
Hayes began as a portraitist in oils, but the requirements expressed by some sitters and commissioners annoyed him and he increasingly spent his time on landscape painting, finally deciding to abandon portraiture, this time with his father's encouragement. He lived with his father in northwest London and met many artist friends of his father. Having previously concentrated on oil painting he then began to experiment with water colours (not covered in his training), which eventually became his preferred medium. He began to exhibit at the Royal Institute of Painters in Water Colours in 1884, with a painting entitled Scene near Horsham, and in 1886 he was elected to membership. In 1883, he had been made a member of the Royal Institute of Oil Painters and exhibited there annually up to and including 1920, with the exception only of 1919. He also exhibited regularly at commercial galleries in London and elsewhere. His exhibiting statistics have been given as: 76 at the Royal Academy, 242 at the Brook Street Gallery, 205 at the Royal Institute of Painters in Water Colours ("RI"), 93 at Royal Institute of Oil Painters, 282 at Walker's Gallery, London, 39 at the Walker Art Gallery, Liverpool and elsewhere. In 1894 the Dowdeswell Galleries in London held an exhibition of works by Claude and his father, which was well reviewed.

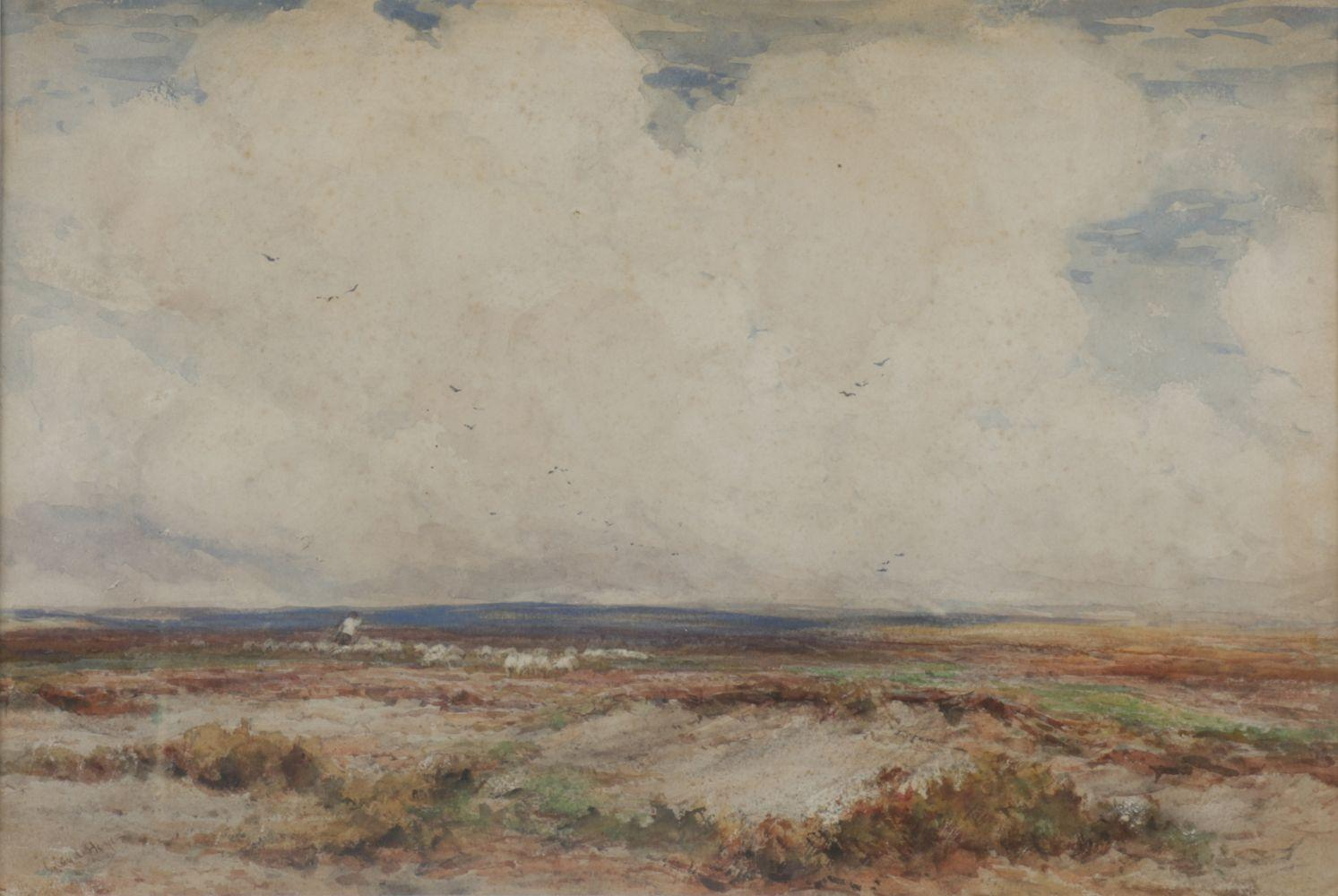
Landscape watercolour

Often, he would rent a furnished house with a studio in a suitable centre and then visit and sketch within about twenty miles. In 1884, when painting at Overton, Hampshire, Hayes met the English landscape painter, James Aumonier, who helped him greatly. Soon after, he developed a friendship with another landscape painter, William Charles Estall. While staying with Estall, Hayes met Mrs. Estall's sister, Jessie Sharp. They married in 1888, and had a son and a daughter. The couple moved into a house in Milford, Surrey, where they lived for some years.

In this period Hayes became friends with the landscape watercolourist Thomas Collier, ten years older, who greatly influenced his technique, reducing the use of opaque bodycolour and scraping-off to modify tone, and returning to a more classical English approach of letting the underlying white paper reflect light through thin watercolours.

Hayes was very productive, often producing two paintings in a day. He held one-man shows in London at least annually, but many of his works were sold "off the easel" to dealers and private collectors. Throughout his career he found time to make numerous studies from nature, landscape foregrounds, animals, and other figures. This enabled him to improvise landscape compositions in the studio, making it impossible to guess whether they were painted direct from nature. He also found time to teach art and inspire other artists, such as Susanna Roope Dockery, who became known for her painting of watercolours of Portugal. Other than the works he exhibited, there is no reliable record of the many thousands of paintings he must have produced in the 45 years in which he was active, although many are still presented for auction.

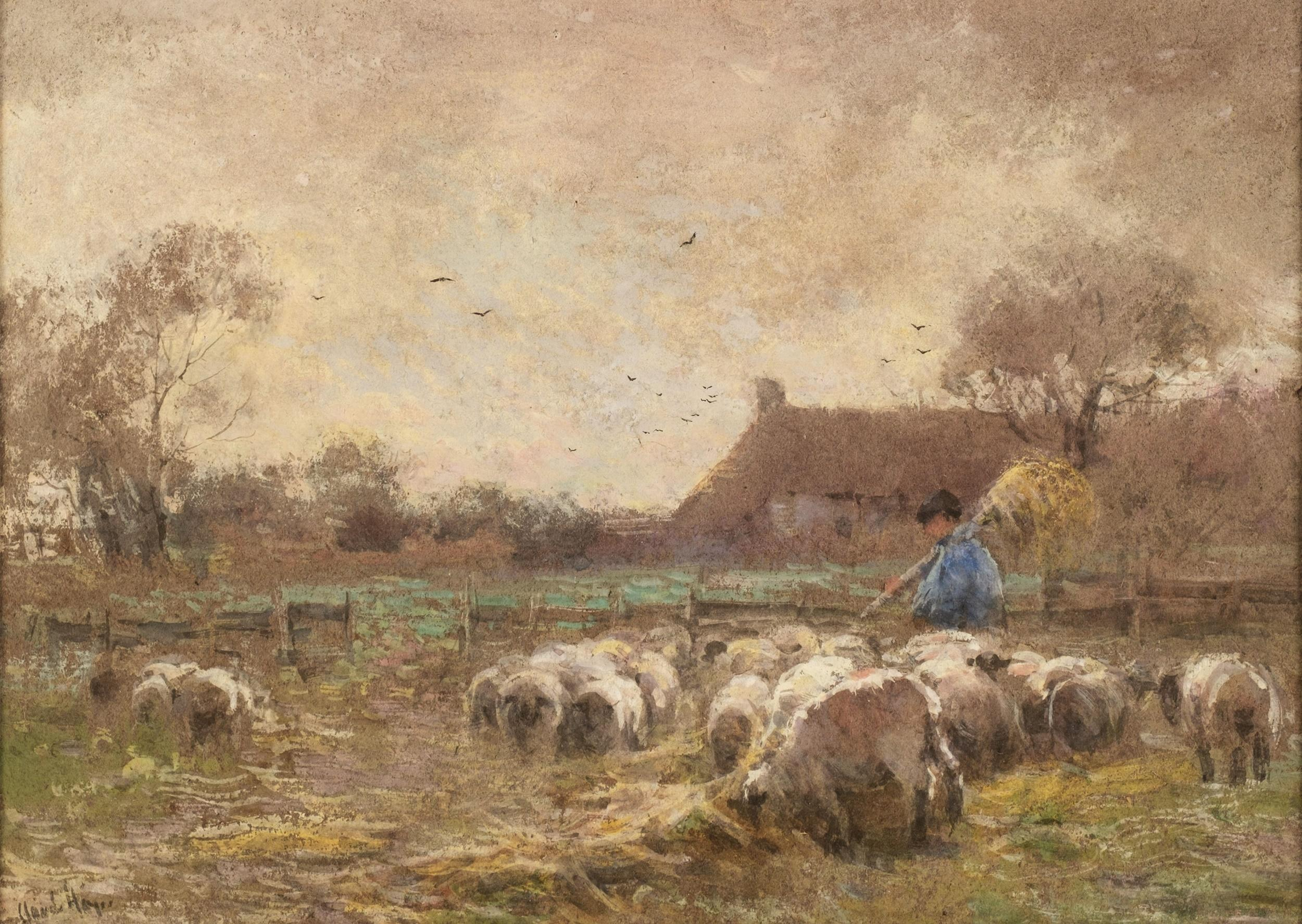
Tending to the Sheep. Gouache on paper

In 1912, Hayes represented England at the Venice Biennale. From 1913, he began to face difficulties. He was unable to arrange for the use of a studio and in 1914 had to undergo an operation, which was not entirely successful and left him in poor health. This restricted his ability to travel to London to maintain contact with dealers and collectors. His illness also made it difficult to paint outdoors, except in the summer months. Nevertheless, according to Reynolds he continued to produce excellent work, including an oil painting called The Sluice, exhibited at the Royal Academy in 1919, and held bi-annual exhibitions in London. During World War I (1914–1918) he donated a considerable part of the proceeds from his exhibitions to war charities.

On the other hand Martin Hardie says that the difficulties over his health and also financial worries "led Hayes to turn out a good deal of hasty and indifferent work" in his last years, though Edward Reynolds defends his late style. His paintings are normally signed, but very few are dated.

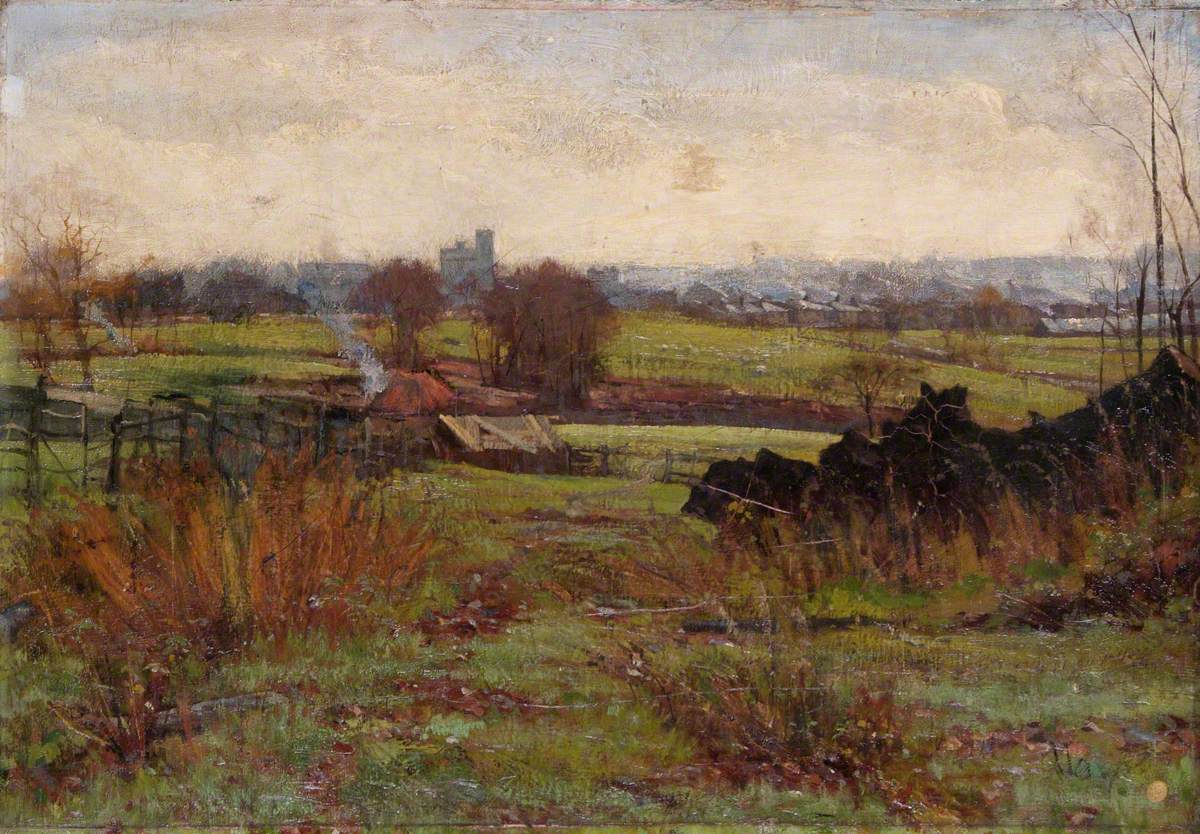
Finchley Road Fields, Hampstead, Holborn Library, oil on canvas

Hayes died on 25 January 1922 in Brockenhurst in Hampshire, where he was then living. He is buried in the local churchyard.

== Collections ==
His work is in various public collections in England and Ireland including the Victoria and Albert Museum, Ulster Museum, Sheffield Museums Trust, Torre Abbey, and the Leeds Art Gallery. Of the two watercolours in the Te Papa Museum of New Zealand, one is a relatively uncommon coastal scene. The Yale Center for British Art has a single example (acquired in 1975), but otherwise Hayes, like many of his contemporary British watercolourists, is not well represented in American museums.

Because of his large production, his watercolours appear frequently for sale on the British and Irish art markets, and rather less frequently in North America and Europe.
