= Thomas Collier (painter) =

English painter

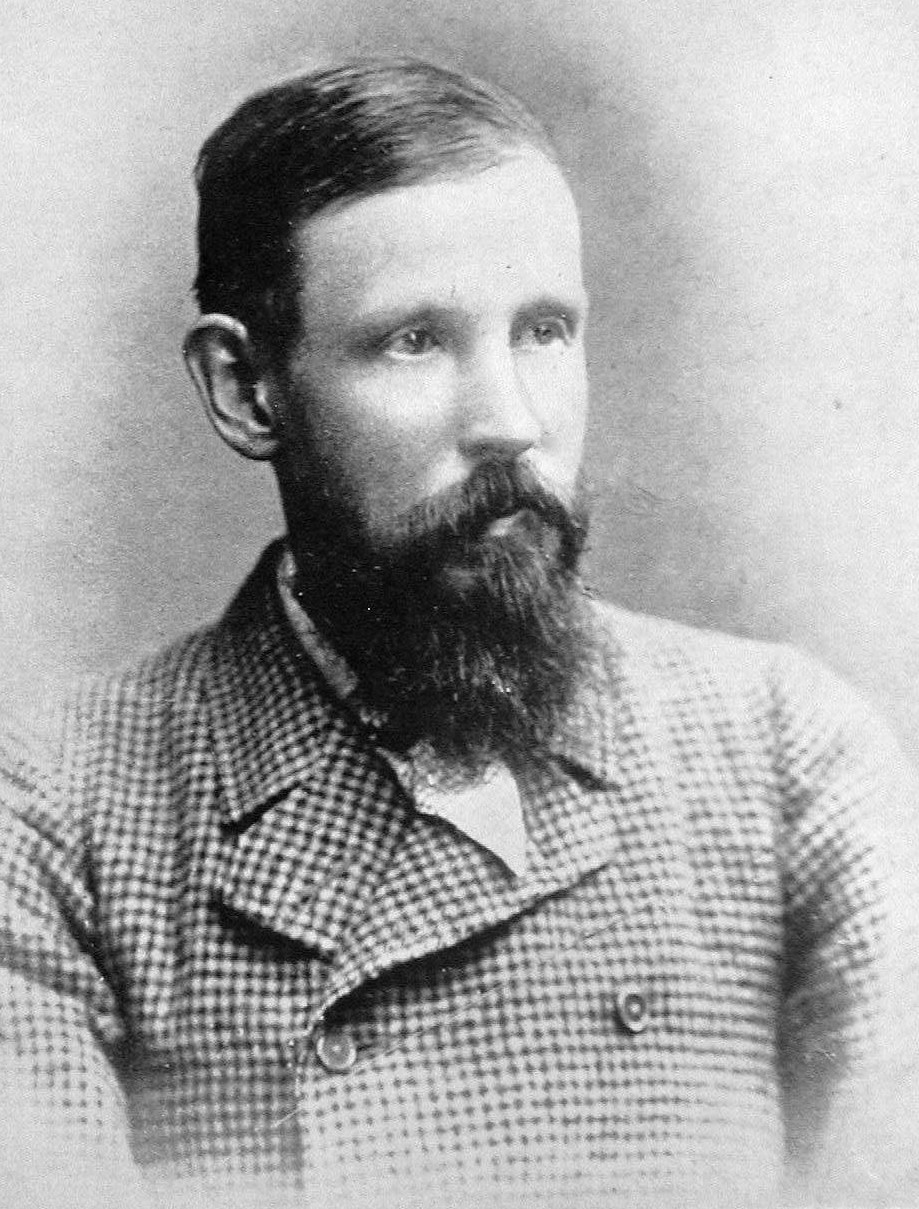
- Born: November 12, 1840; Glossop, Derbyshire
- Died: May 14, 1891 (aged 50); Hampstead
- Resting place: Highgate Cemetery

Thomas Collier RI (12 November 1840 – 14 May 1891) was an English landscape painter, mainly in watercolour. Although not a prolific worker or exhibitor, he is regarded as one of the finest English landscape watercolourists.

Collier was industrious, retiring and often in poor health, yet financially independent, able to work without pandering to popular taste and to travel at will into the Suffolk countryside.

== Biography ==
Collier was born in Glossop in Derbyshire, the son of Martha Siddall and Thomas Collier, who was a prosperous grocer and tea dealer. He received tuition at the Manchester School of Art and, inspired by David Cox's example, lived at Betws-y-Coed in northern Wales between 1864 and 1869. He moved to London in about 1870 after being elected to the New Water Colour Society, as it was then called.

In the 1870s he became a close friend of Edmund Morison Wimperis, who was actually a few years older, but then less experienced in watercolour. The two often toured together, painting side by side, and Wimperis was greatly influenced by him, in stylistic and technical matters. Somewhat later he formed a similar friendship with, and had a similar influence on, the younger Claude Hayes.

Collier was also a close friend of Charles Stuart Millard, the Canadian-born painter (who moved to England before 1879 and was employed as an instructor at the South Kensington Art School, before taking up an appointment as Headmaster at the Cheltenham School of Art).

He was made a Chevalier of the Legion of Honour in recognition of a painting sent to the Paris International Exhibition of 1878. In 1879 he arranged for the construction of a large house and studio at 9 Hampstead Hill Gardens in Hampstead where he spent his days painting and entertaining artist friends.

Collier died in Hampstead, London in 1891 and was buried in a family grave on the western side of Highgate Cemetery.

== Gallery ==
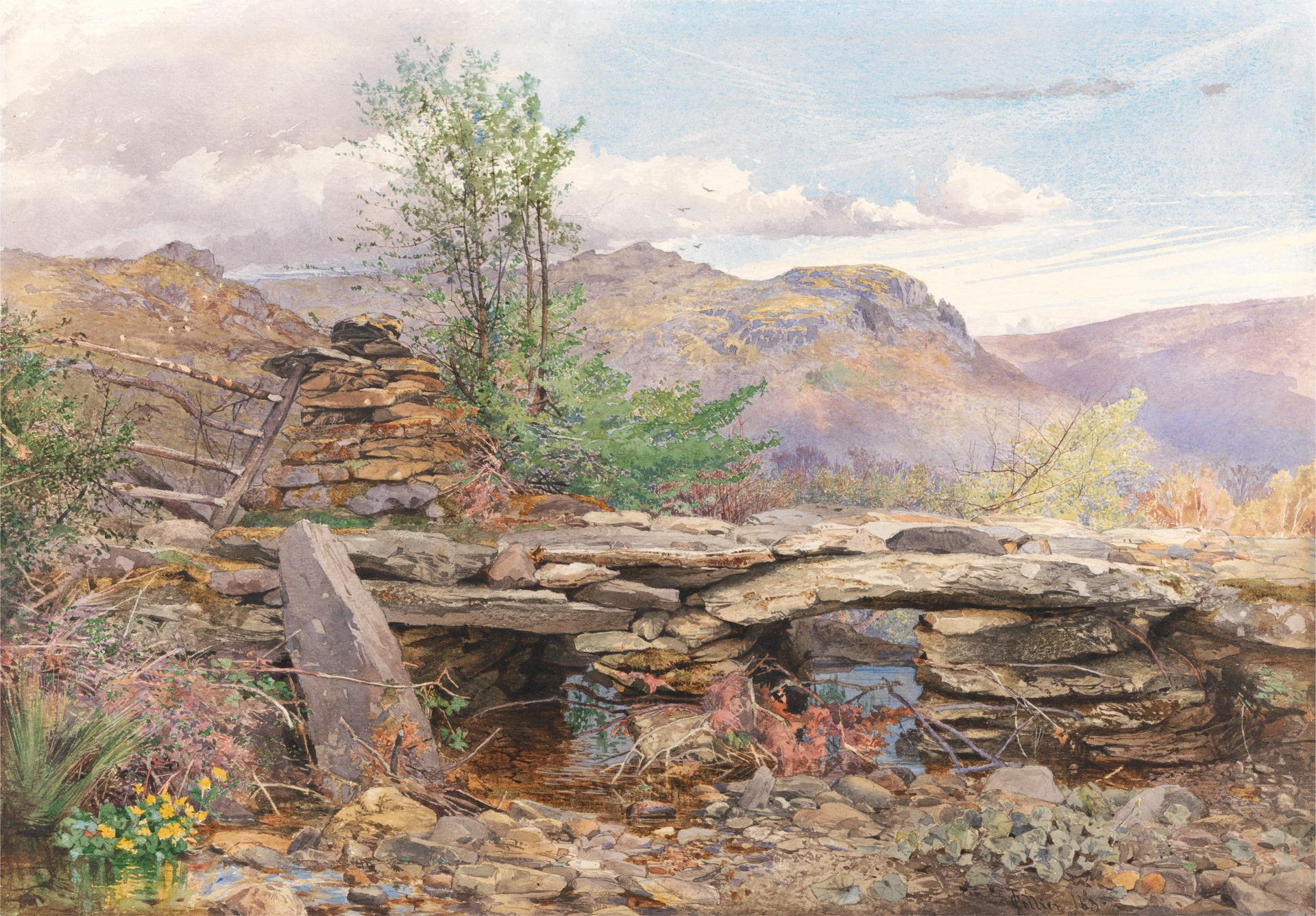
Pentre Ddu Bridge, North Wales, Yale Center for British Art

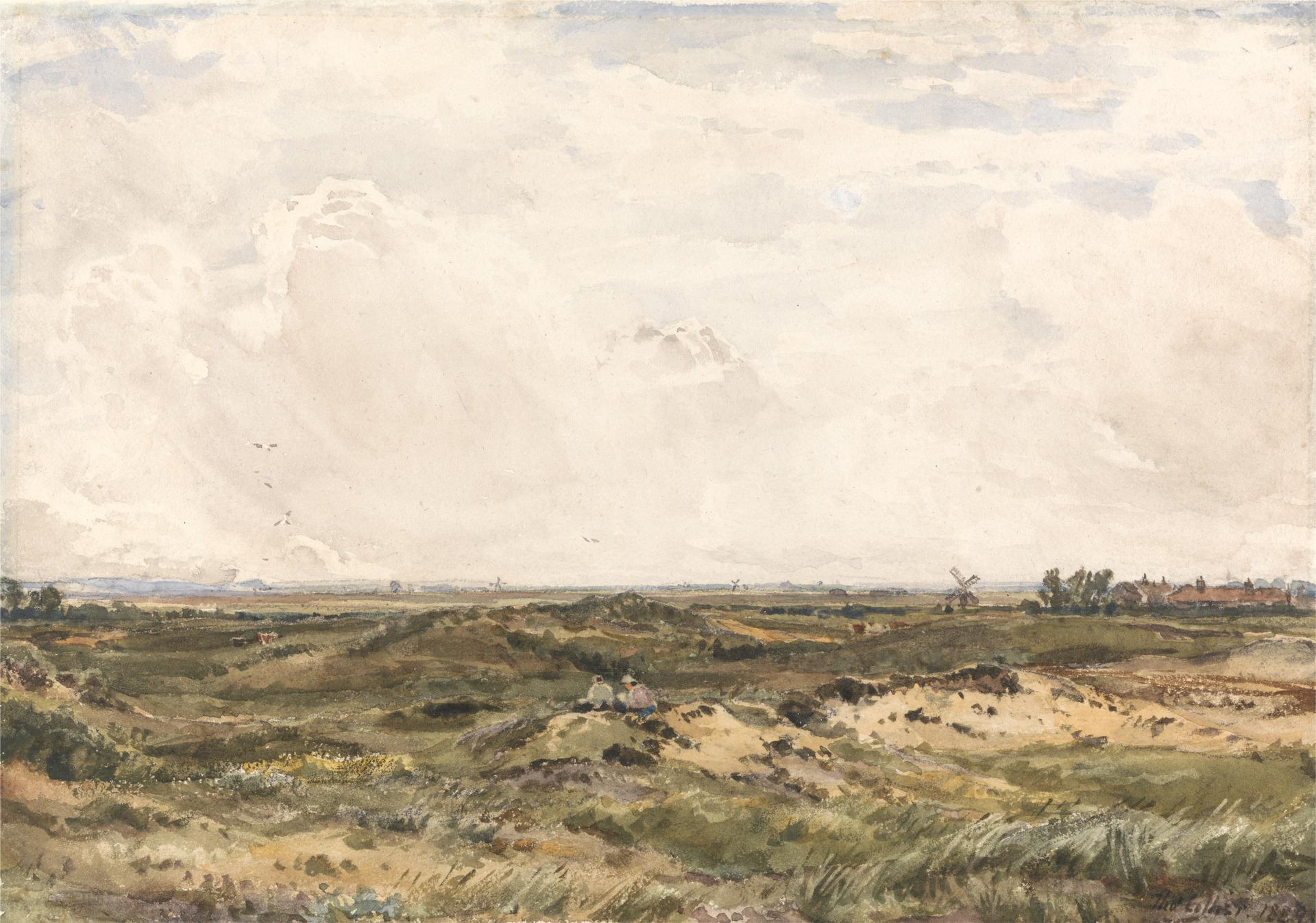
Near Caistor, Yale Center for British Art

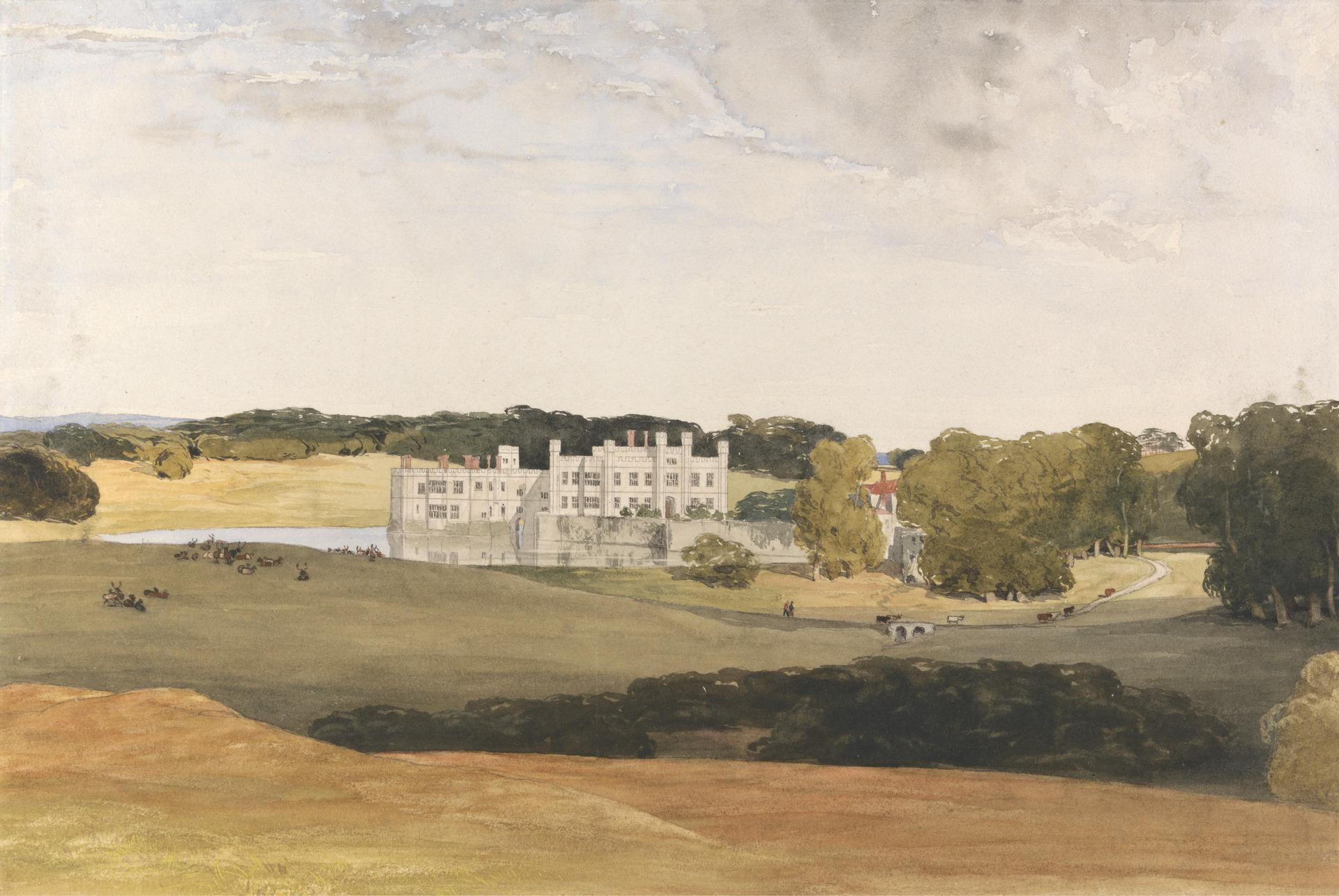
Leeds Castle, Kent, Yale Center for British Art

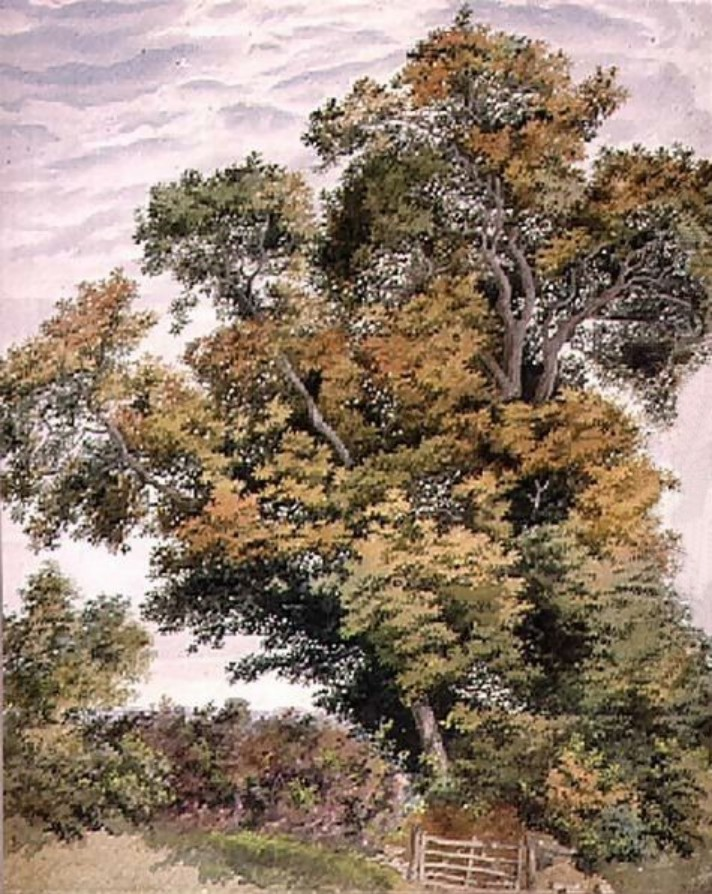
Study of an oak tree

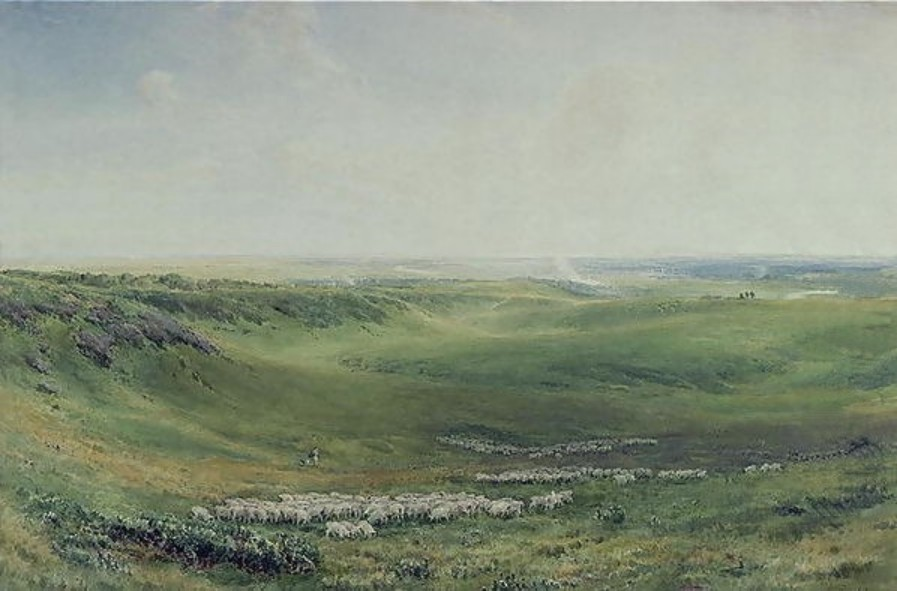
Wide Pastures, Sussex

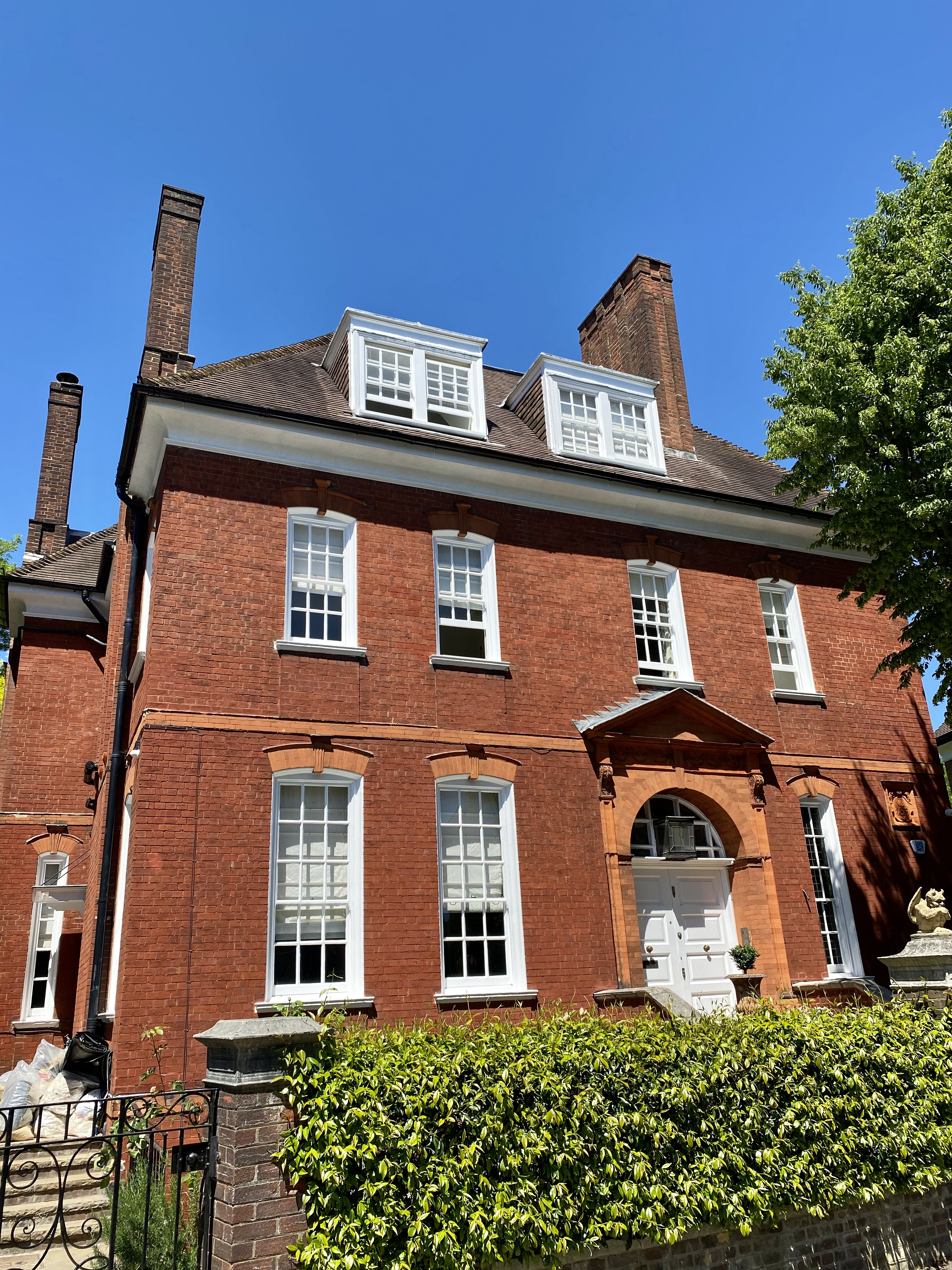
9 Hampstead Hill Gardens, Collier's Hampstead residence, in 2021

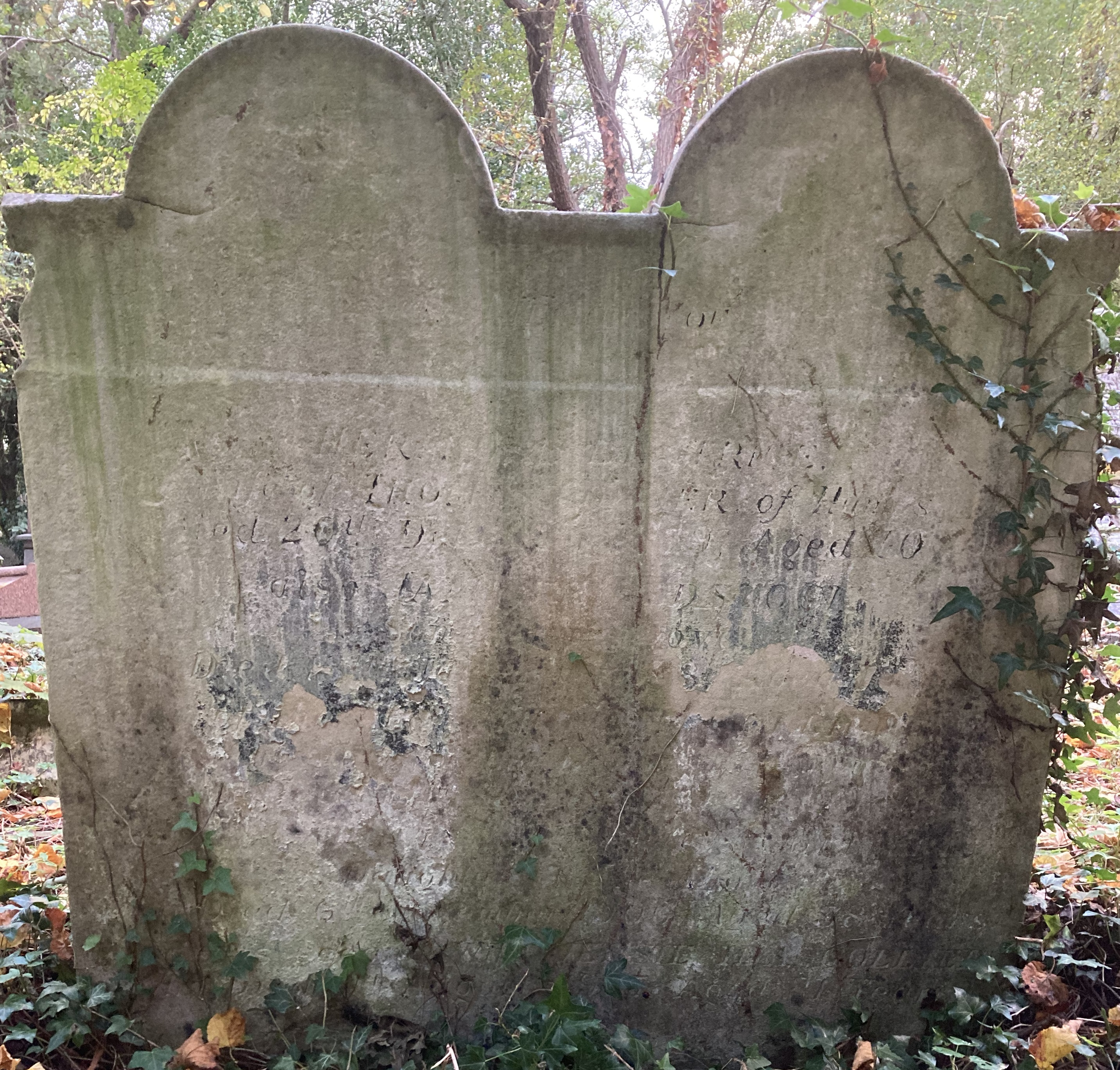
Family grave of Thomas Collier in Highgate Cemetery

== Bibliography ==
- Bury, Adrian. The life and art of Thomas Collier, R. I., Chevalier of the legion of honour 1840-1891, with a treatise on the English water-colour (London: F. Lewis, 1944).
