= Martin Hardie (artist) =

English art historian

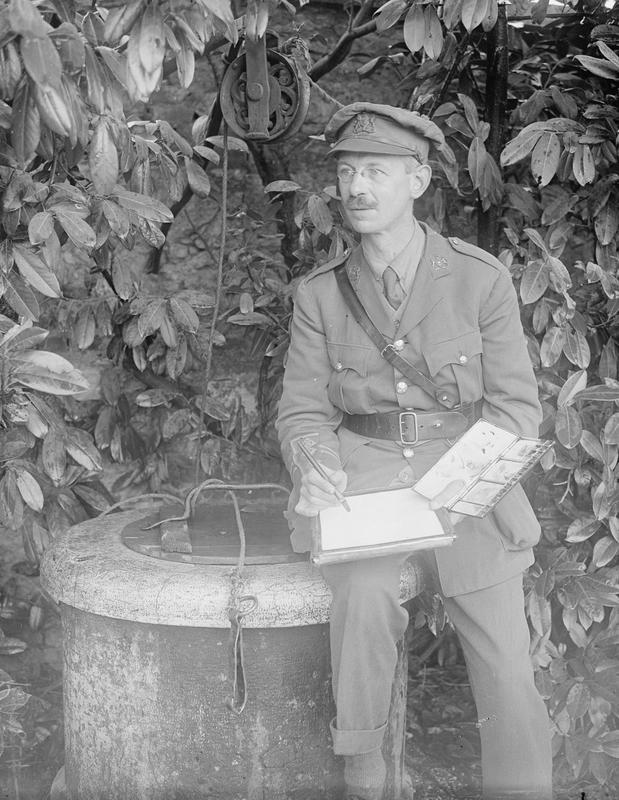
Captain Martin Hardie, sketching in Italy during WW1.

Martin Hardie C.B.E., RWS, RI (1875–1952) was a painter in watercolour, printmaker, art historian and museum curator. His three-volume history of Watercolour Painting in Britain, published posthumously in the 1960s, is recognised as the standard work on the subject.

Born in London, Hardie was an expert on watercolours, and painted many himself. He was a member of the Royal Watercolour Society (1934), the Royal Institute of Painters in Water Colours (1924, Vice-President 1934) and the Royal Society of Painter-Etchers and Engravers, of which he became Honorary Secretary. He received a C.B.E. in 1935. He married Agnes Pattisson in 1903, and from the 1930s onwards lived in Tonbridge, where there is a "Martin Hardie Way" on an estate where the street names are all of artists. He was an army captain during World War I, and some works show the aftermath of war in France.

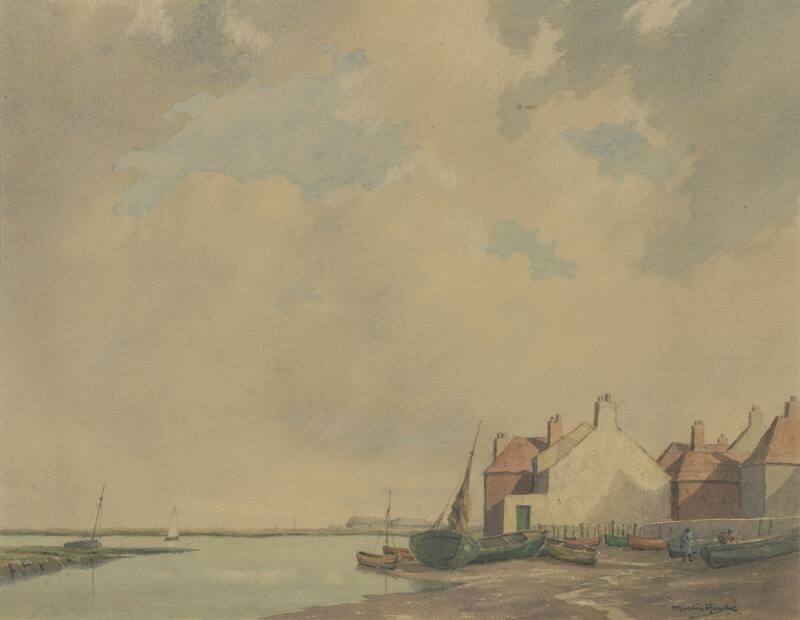
Wells-next-the-Sea, watercolour, c. 1946

His uncles were the Scottish painters Charles Martin Hardie (1858–1916), and John Pettie (1839–1893), on whom he published a book in 1908. After Saint Paul's School, London, he read Classics at Trinity College, Cambridge, and then attended classes at the Royal College of Art while working at the V&A (at that time the two institutions shared buildings). There he learnt printmaking techniques under Sir Frank Short. After several years as the second in charge, from 1914, in 1921 Hardie was appointed Keeper of the Department of Prints and Drawings at the Victoria & Albert Museum, a position he kept until his retirement in 1935. James Laver, who worked under him and wrote the catalogue of his prints, described him as 'the most considerate of chiefs, the most helpful of guides, the most delightful of friends' and said of his art 'his is a refined and delicate talent founded upon good draftsmanship and an exquisite sense of atmosphere'.

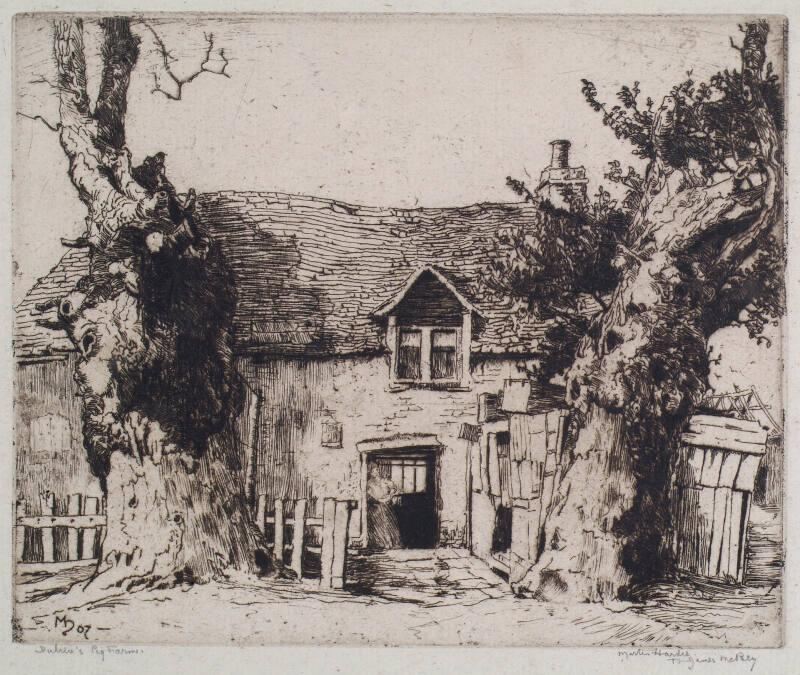
Duhen's Pig Farm, etching, 1908, 20.2 cm (7.9 in); width: 15 cm (5.9 in), edition of 50+3.

Interest in the early work of Samuel Palmer, by then a little known artist, was rekindled in 1926 by a V&A exhibition curated by Hardie: Drawings, Etchings and Woodcuts made by Samuel Palmer and other Disciples of William Blake.

== Art ==
His watercolours are typically fairly small and of English landscapes, or buildings in landscapes. His prints number over 200, in etching and sometimes drypoint, and more often show small, untidy buildings, typical subjects from the British Etching Revival. Over 300 works are in British museums, especially the Victoria & Albert Museum, to which he and later his widow made substantial donations. Tate Britain has three small monochrome landscape works, each described as Blot, in the Manner of Alexander Cozens. The Rijksmuseum in Amsterdam has several etchings, and the Yale Center for British Art has two watercolours and several prints. In July 1925 he exhibited 6 works in the Fifth Annual Exhibition of the Australian Painter-Etchers’ Society, held at Art Gallery, Education Department, Sydney, NSW.

Hardie's son Frank Hardie, a political historian born in 1911, authored the most recent catalogue of his father's prints, published by the Ashmolean Museum in 1975. He had been President of the Oxford Union in 1933, when the King and Country debate was held.

Earlier catalogues had been by James Laver (1937-38) and Frederick Wedmore: The Etched Works of Martin Hardie -- with an appreciation by Sir Frederick Wedmore and a note by Sir Frank Short, 1914, both published while Hardie was still producing prints.

His paintings are usually signed, and often dated: the dates seem to begin during WWI, with one example dated as late as "September 1951".

== Books ==
- Watercolour Painting in Britain, posthumously published in 3 volumes between 1966 and 1968.

Volume I: The Eighteenth Century (1966), London: B. T. Batsford
Volume II: The Romantic Period (1967), London: B. T. Batsford
Volume III: The Victorians (1968), London: B. T. Batsford

- Various catalogues of the national collections
- Engraving and etching - a handbook for the use of students and print collectors (1906), Hardie's translation of a German work
- George Morland; a biographical essay, 1906
- John Pettie, R.A., H.R.S.A., 1908
- Catalogues of the prints of Frank Short, James McBey, William Lee-Hankey (1921), Charles Meryon (1931), and others.
