= Exhibition of Recent Specimens of Photography =

1852 photography exhibit

The Exhibition of Recent Specimens of Photography was an 1852 exhibition organised by the Society of Arts. It was the first exhibition in the world dedicated solely to photography. Earlier exhibitions had been done as part of a larger general exhibition, e.g. at the 1851 Great Exhibition of London. It was held at the House of the Society of Arts in London from 22 December 1852 until 29 January 1853 and featured the work of 76 photographers, for many of whom this was their first public exhibition. It led directly to the creation of the Photographic Society.

== Details ==
The exhibition was proposed by Joseph Cundall and agreed upon by the Society of Arts on 17 November 1852. Organised mainly by Cundall and Philip Henry Delamotte, it opened on 22 December 1852 at the House of the Society of Arts in London. Roger Fenton gave at the night of the opening a lecture titled "On the Present Position and Future of the Art of Photography", which was also included in the catalogue. Some 400 photographs were initially on display. Originally intended to only stay open for a week, it was extended until 29 January 1853 due to the greater than expected success, including visits from well-known painters like Dante Gabriel Rossetti. This also lead to the addition of 400 further photographs and a reprint of the catalogue. In total, 76 photographers had their work shown at the exhibition, many of them British but with a large representation of Continental, mainly French artists as well.

The exhibition wanted to focus on the artistic aspect of photography, not the commercial side, and excluded daguerreotypes. Technology was still fast developing at the time, and the exhibition came at the moment that the older calotype process, with paper negatives, was being replaced by the new collodion process, first described in 1850 and 1851 and already getting very popular. Some 460 exhibited photographs were made with the calotype process, against some 300 for the other processes, mainly the collodion process and albumen prints.

The exhibition lead directly to the creation of the Photographic Society on 20 January 1853. One of its first endeavours was a follow-up exhibition of 83 works that would travel around the United Kingdom, starting in September 1853 and lasting until April 1854. Further similar touring exhibitions were organised in 1854 and 1855.

== Participants ==
- Frederick Scott Archer (1813–1857)
- Cornelius Birch Bagster (1815–1893)
- George Barker
- Either Edmond Becquerel or Pierre-Emile-Joseph Pecarrere (catalogued as E. Pec or as Ed. Pecquerel), contributed 47 prints
- Frederick W. Berger, one of the first council members of the new Photographic Society
- Giovanni Bianchi (1811–1893) Swiss-born but active in Russia, also known as Jean or Ivan
- Robert Jefferson Bingham (1824 or 1825–1870)
- Samuel Buckle (1809–1860)
- Giacomo Caneva (1813–1865), Italian
- Archibald Lewis Cocke (1824–1896)
- Eugène Constant, French but active in Italy
- James Contencin (1814–1879)
- Louis Crette (1823–1872) French-Italian active in Nice, also known a Luigi Cretté or Lodoïsch Crette-Romet
- John Cumming, 1824–1908, father of William Skeoch Cumming
- Joseph Cundall (1818–1895)
- Henry Cundell (1810–1886), early Scottish photographer; two of his brothers were also pioneer photographers
- Philip Henry Delamotte (1821–1889)
- Delatouche, photographic company in London
- Hugh Welch Diamond (1809–1886)
- Maxime Du Camp (1822–1894)
- Patrick Dudgeon (1817–1895)
- Thomas Damant Eaton (1799 or 1800–1871)
- Roger Fenton contributed 41 photographs
- Claude-Marie Ferrier (1811–1889) and Hugh Owen (1808–1897) contributed 72 photographs of The Great Exhibition
- Frédéric Flacheron (1813–1883)
- M. Flech
- Peter Wickens Fry (1795–1860)
- Robert Cameron Galton (1830–1902), cousin of Francis Galton
- Thomas Minchin Goodeve (1821–1902) (also known as T. M. Goodeve), writer on mechanics, professor at King's College London and lecturer at the Royal College of Science
- Thomas Henry Hennah (1826–1876)
- Nicolaas Henneman (1813–1898), Dutch
- J. Heritage
- George Hilditch (1803–1857)
- Fallon Horne (1814–1858), from the company Horne, Thornthwaite, and Wood
- Captain Levett Landon Boscawen Ibbetson (1799–1869)
- Baynham Jones Jr. (1806–1890)
- Calvert Jones (1804–1877)
- Edward Kater (1816–1866), son of Henry Kater
- N. Leberg
- C. L. Le Blanc
- Gustave Le Gray (1820–1884)
- Henri Le Secq (1818–1882)
- Lodoisck = Luigi Crette
- Frédéric Martens (1806–1885) also known as Frédéric Vincent de Martens
- William Clapham Meates (1815–1893)
- Juan, Count of Montizón (1822–1887)
- Lady Henrietta Augusta Nevill (1830–1912)
- Lady Isabel Mary Frances Nevill (1831–1915)
- William John Newton (1785–1869)
- Lieutenant Robert Petley (1809 or 1812–1869)
- Eugene Piot (1812–1890 or 1891)
- J. Player
- Pierre Victor Plumier, one of the Plumier brothers, from Belgium
- Paul Pretsch (1808–1873), Austrian, important in the early printing processes for photographs with his photogalvanography (or Photoelectrotype)
- Walter Waters Reeves (1819–1892)
- Henri Victor Regnault (1810–1878)
- François-Auguste Renard (1806–1890)
- Alfred Rosling (1802–1882)
- Ross & Thomson (James Ross and John Thompson) photographers to the queen, from Edinburgh, won a medal at the Exhibition (c. 1851)
- J. C. Sanford
- George Shaw (1818–1904)
- William Sherlock (born 1813)
- Thomas Sims (1826–1910), active in Tunbridge Wells, brother-in-law to Alfred Russel Wallace
- John Spencer (John Alexander Spencer) (1827–1878)
- John Stewart (1800–1887), brother-in-law to John Herschel
- George B. Stokes (born 1805)
- Henry Fox Talbot (1800–1877), contributed six prints and an album with 59 reproductions of very early photographs
- B. A. Thoms
- Merton Thoms (The porcelain collector?)
- William John Thoms (1803–1885)
- Warren T. Thompson (active 1840–1870)
- Benjamin Brecknell Turner (1815–1894)
- John Urie (1820–1910 or 1920)
- George Weddell
- Joseph Wilks
