= Robert Jefferson Bingham =

English pioneer photographer (1824-1870)

- Born: Billesdon, Leicestershire, England
- Baptised: 7 March 1824
- Died: 21 February 1870; Brussels, Belgium
- Known for: Pioneer photographer, portraits, and reproductions of paintings. Early user and proponent of the collodion process.
- Notable work: Photographic illustrations for The Great Exhibition Report (1851), Photographic Catalogue raisonné of Paul Delaroche's works (1858), reproductions of works by Gustave Courbet and Gustave Moreau.
- Spouse: Emma Reeve (m. 1853; d. 1868)

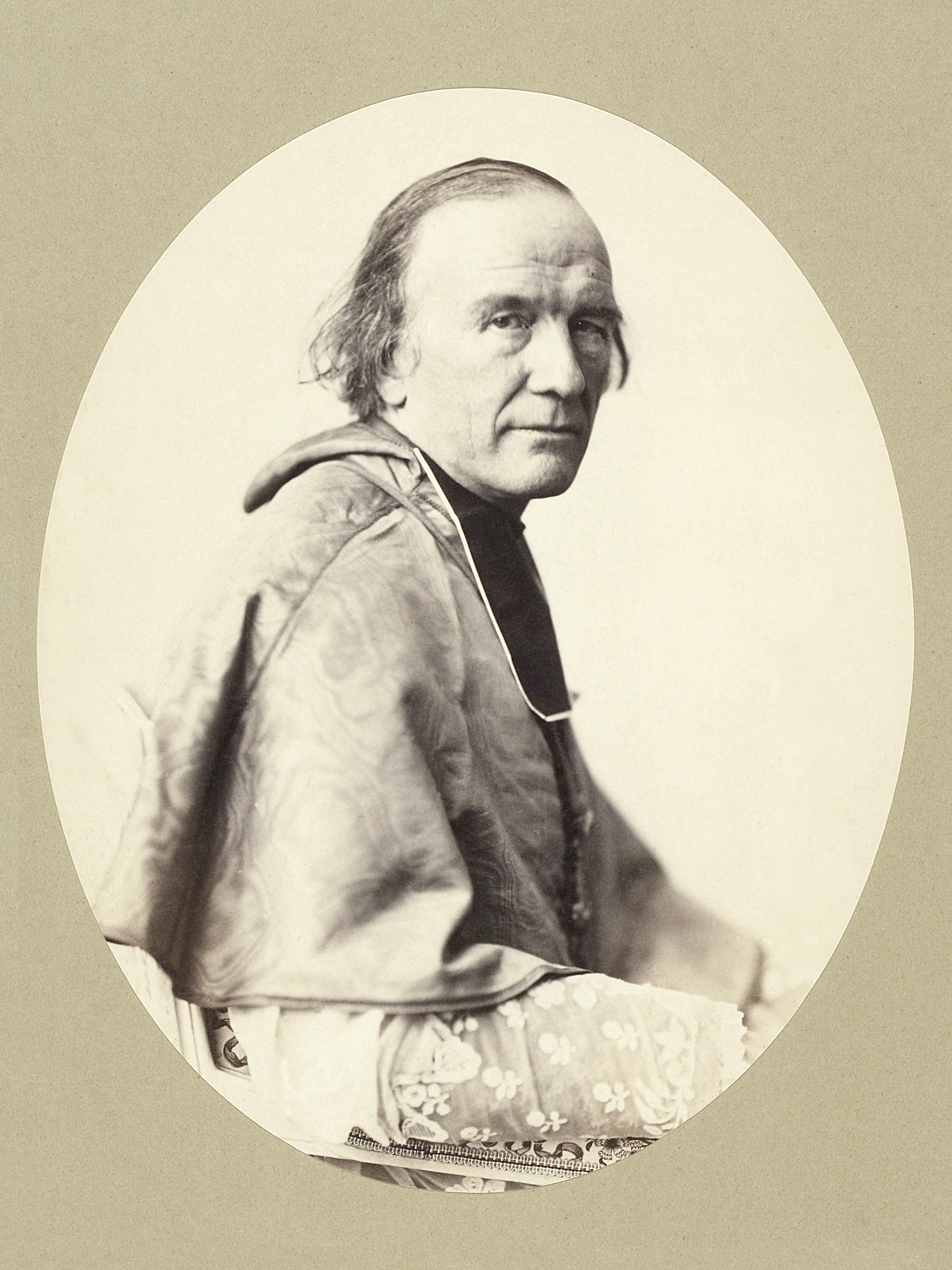
Photograph of archbishop Georges Darboy, ca. 1865

Robert Jefferson Bingham (bapt. 7 March 1824 – 21 February 1870) was an English pioneer photographer, mainly active in France, making portraits and reproductions of paintings. He is one of the first photographers to use and write about the collodion process, which he claimed to have invented.

== Early life and family ==
Bingham was born in Billesdon, Leicestershire, England, where he was baptised in March 1824. His parents were John Cowener Bingham and his wife, Martha.

In 1853, at the British Embassy in Paris, he married Emma Reeve, daughter of surgeon John Reed of Kinver, Staffordshire. She died 15 years later at their home on rue de La Rochefoucauld in Paris.

== Career ==
Bingham first started working as a chemist at the London Institution. In 1847, he published a new edition of "Photogenic manipulation, containing the theory and plain instructions in the art of photography", a work that would be expanded and reprinted at least four times over the next few years.

He showed 19 photographs at The Great Exhibition of 1851, and was commissioned, as a result of the influence of Henry Cole, a member of the Executive Committee, to print the glass plate negatives by Claude-Marie Ferrier of prize winning exhibits as illustrations for the photographically-illustrated presentation copies of the Report by the Juries. Bingham set up a photographic printing establishment in Versailles in order to undertake this contract. Some of the photographs and others by Bingham were shown in 1852 at the exhibition Recent Specimens of Photography held at the Society of Arts, London, the first exhibition to focus solely on photography.

Bingham also made photographs of the Exposition Universelle of 1855 in Paris. His ability to take some 2500 photographs at relatively high speeds on this occasion encouraged other photographers to use the collodion process for their work as well, helping it become the most popular method from 1855 until about 1880. Henry Cole sent him at the same time to the Louvre to photograph the masterpieces of the museum collection. At some point in 1851 1855, or 1859, Bingham moved to Paris to work there as a photographer, at first together with the American Warren T. Thompson until Thompson returned to England in 1856. Bingham not only worked at the 1855 Exposition, but also displayed his own life-size portraits, for which he won a Medal First Class. Due to a lack of commercial success, however, he soon stopped producing these huge photographs and stuck to more standard formats.

His work at the Louvre inspired him to make photographic portraiture a commercial enterprise, and in 1857 he opened his new atelier in the Nouvelle Athènes quarter of Paris, one of the hotspots of artistic activity at the time. He became friends with many artists, photographing them and their works, and started on a new project, a photographic collection of the works of the recently deceased painter Paul Delaroche. Published in 1858, it was the first photographic catalogue raisonné. It was followed over the next few years by similar works about other artists, including one in 1860 on Ary Scheffer and another one with photographs of the major works of the 1860 Salon. Smaller works with only a handful of photographs were produced for particular collections and for the Napoleon Museum in Amiens.

His reproductions of paintings were famed for their suggestion of the original colours in the black-and-white photographs, and were lauded as being far superior to all other similar efforts until then. Gustave Moreau used to send photographs of his paintings, made by Bingham, to people to inform them of his latest creations, without the need to wait for a Salon or other exhibition. Similarly, Gustave Courbet showed his paintings, which were rejected for the Salon, through photographs made by Bingham. His 1863 work "Retour de conférence", which was even rejected at the Salon des Refusés, was destroyed by a fundamentalist Christian, making the photographs by Bingham the only remaining trace of it. But the public outrage about the painting was so great that the government had the negatives destroyed in 1867 as well. Courbet's 1864 "Vénus et Psyché" has disappeared as well and is also only known through Bingham's photographs.

Bingham continued to exhibit in Great Britain and France, winning another medal at the 1862 International Exhibition in London. He was one of the leading members of the Société française de photographie, contributing a lot of works to their exhibitions. Early in 1870, he suddenly left Paris for Brussels, where he died in February of that year. His atelier remained open until 1875, publishing more reproductions of his negatives.

== Bibliography ==
- "Photogenic manipulation : containing the theory and plain instructions in the art of photography", first Bingham edition (fifth edition overall) in 1847, reprinted at least 4 times until 1850, published by George Knight
- 1858: "Oeuvre de Paul Delaroche : reproduit en photographie par Bingham; accompagné d'une notice sur la vie et les oeuvres de Paul Delaroche", published by Goupil & Cie.
- 1859: "Oeuvres de Mr. Chifflart. Grand prix de Rome" published by Alfred Cadart.
- 1860: "Oeuvre de Ary Scheffer, reproduit en photographie par Bingham. Accompagné d'une notice sur la vie et les ouvrages de Ary Scheffer, par L. V.", published by Goupil.
- 1860: "L'album : recueil de photographies des chefs-d'oeuvre de l'art contemporain", published by Paul Durand-Ruel, with texts by Théophile Gautier and others

== Collodion process controversy ==
The invention of the collodion process, the most common process for photography between 1855 and 1881, is usually given to Frederick Scott Archer, who published the method to achieve this in 1851, and said to have invented it as early as 1848. Another candidate was Gustave Le Gray, who published another, less practical collodion process in 1850. But until the end of his life, Bingham proudly proclaimed that he was the first to have written about the collodion process, either in his 1848 book or in the January 1850 edition, making him the inventor of the process. While he is generally acknowledged as one of the first inventors to independently suggest collodion as an alternative for paper, the invention is usually still given to Archer because he published the first practically usable description of the process.

== Gallery ==
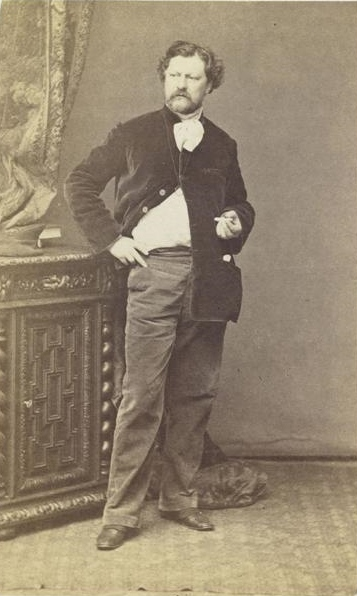
Alexandre Bida, ca. 1855

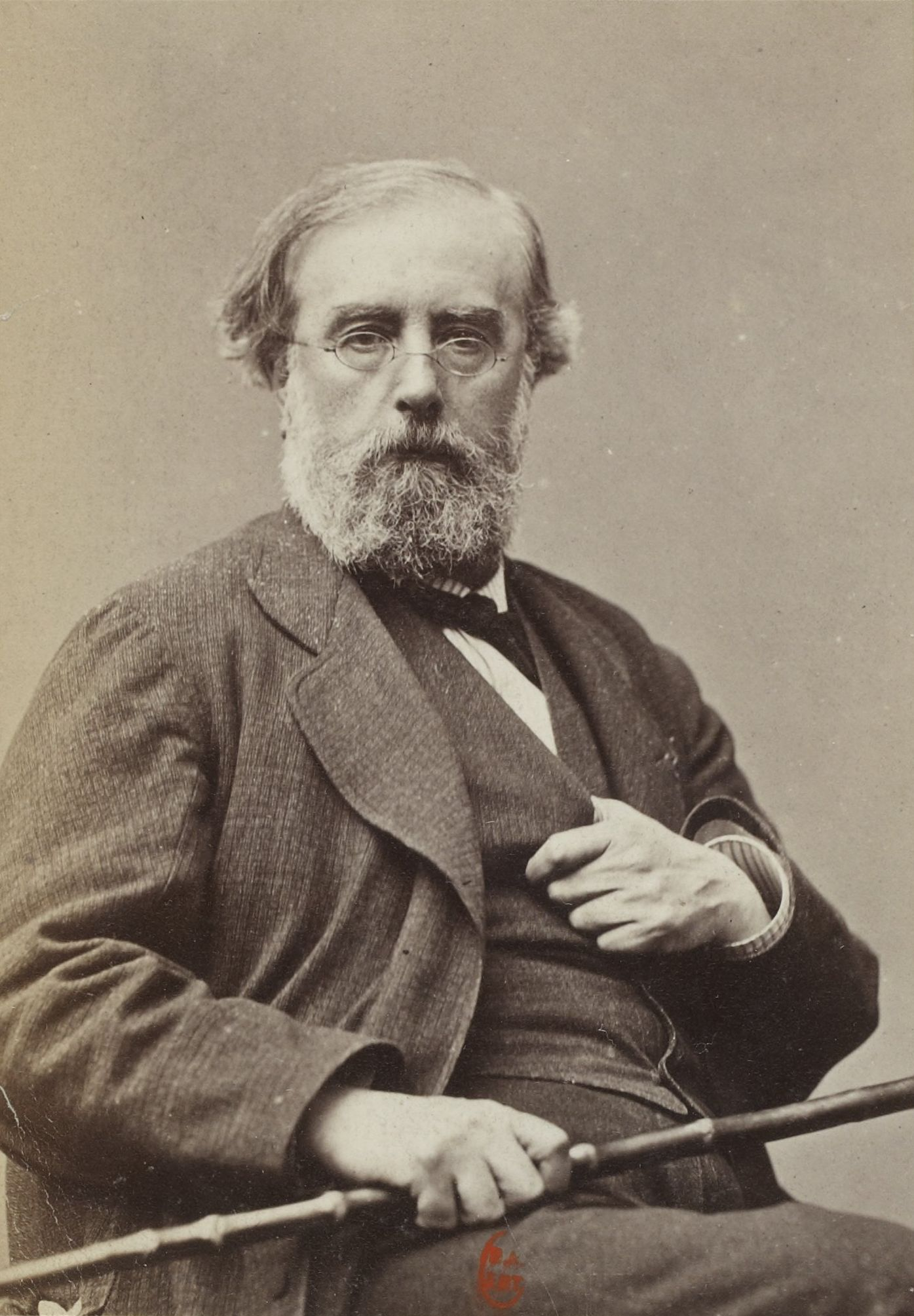
Auguste Gendron

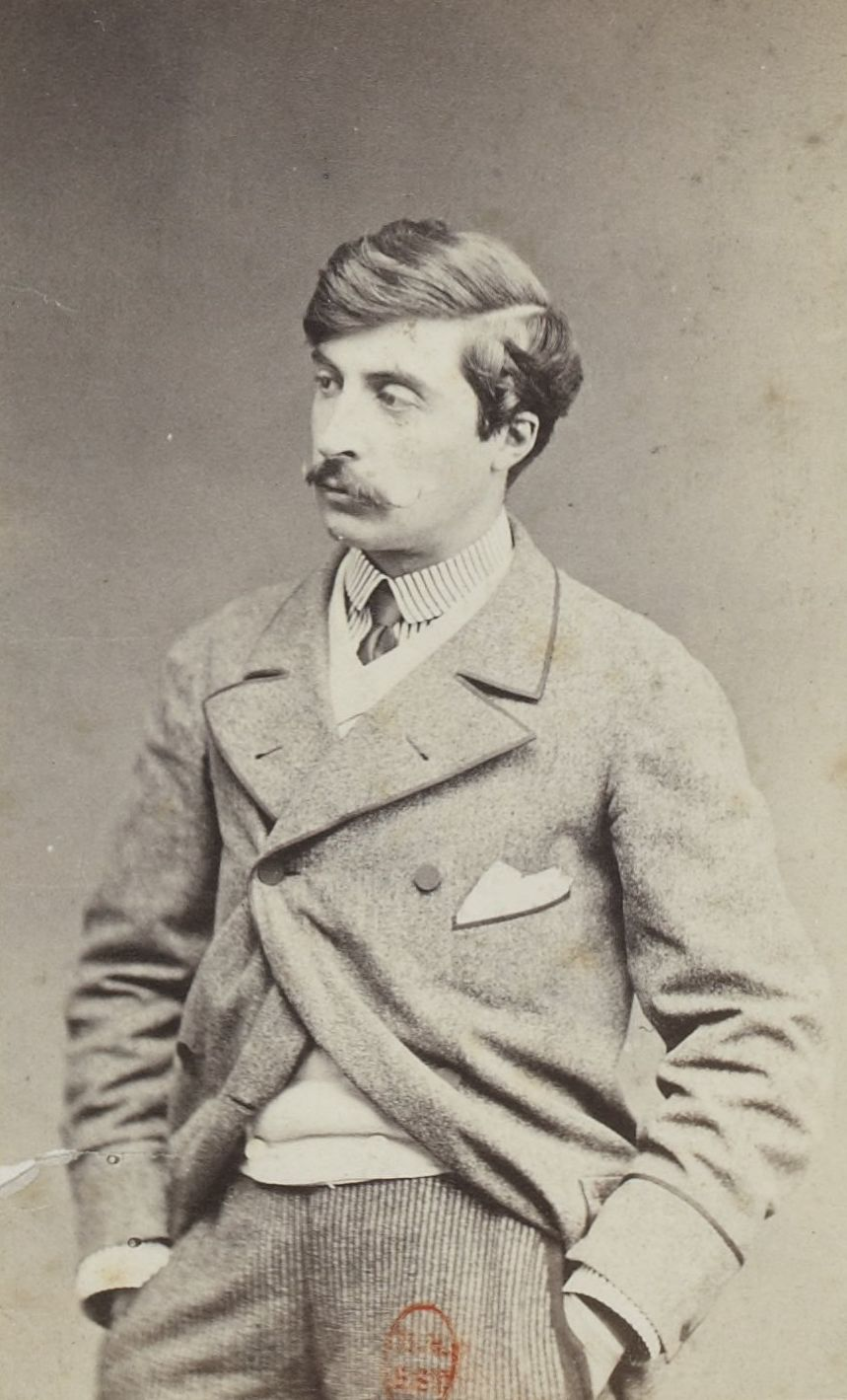
James Tissot

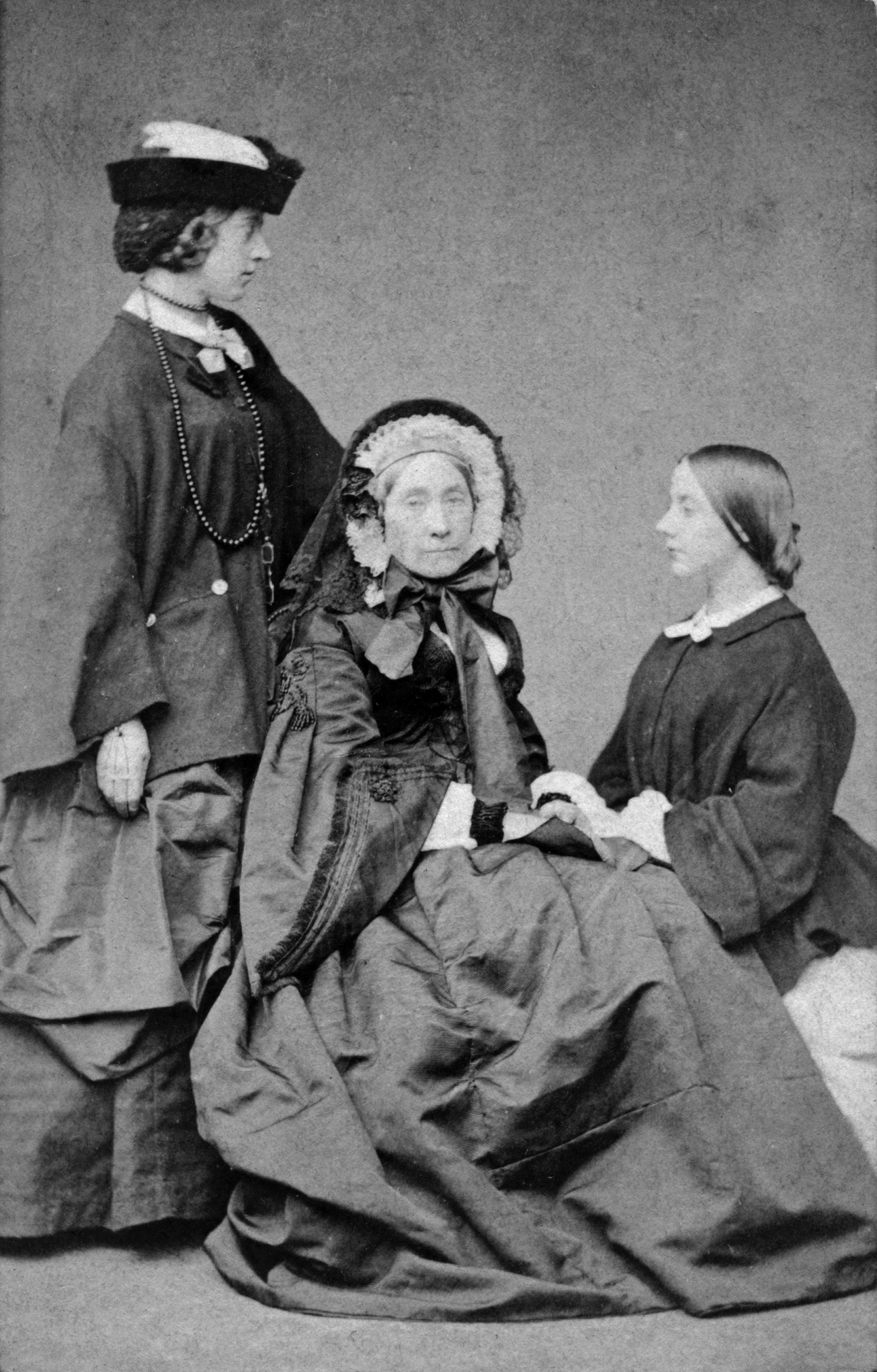
Alexine Tinne, Henriëtte Tinne-van Capellen and Jetty Hora Siccama, 1860
