= The Photographic Journal =

Journal published by the Royal Photographic Society

- The RPS Journal, July 2014
- Editor: Kathleen Morgan
- Former editors: Clare Harris, Andrew Catternach, David Land, Roy Green
- Categories: Photography
- Frequency: 12/year
- Circulation: 11,079 (ABC audit Jan 2018-Dec 2018)
- Publisher: Royal Photographic Society
- Founder: Photographic Society [of London]
- Founded: 1853
- First issue: March 3, 1853
- Company: Royal Photographic Society
- Country: United Kingdom
- Based in: London
- Language: English
- Website: www.rps.org/rps-journal
- ISSN: 1468-8670
- OCLC: 271380515

An issue of the Photographic Journal from May 1894

The Journal of the Photographic Society, later the Royal Photographic Society, was first published on 3 March 1853 and it has been published continuously ever since. The magazine's title was changed with volume 5 (1859) when it was renamed The Photographic Journal and this was recently updated to the RPS Journal. The publication is the oldest photographic periodical in the world. For much of the magazine's history it had an influence that went far beyond the society and a print run considerably in excess of the society's membership. The magazine has had its circulation ABC audited since 2010. From June 2014 Think Publishing took on responsibility for publishing the journal on the society's behalf. The Photographic Journal is not affiliated with ThePhotographicJournal.com, which is an online publication that began in 2013.

== Editors ==
The first editor-in-chief was Arthur Henfry FRS FLS. When Roger Fenton retired as the society's secretary in January 1856 the role of editor and secretary was combined. The Rev. J. R. Major was elected to the post which he held until June 1857 when William Crookes replaced him. In August 1856 Hugh Welch Diamond took over from Crookes who founded his own journal, Photographic News. Diamond remained editor until December 1868 when John Spiller took over until February 1880. The position was taken over by William de Wiveleslie Abney who remained editor well into the twentieth century. The current editor is Clare Harris.

Vols. 1-2 . Arthur Henfry FRS FLS
Vol. 3. Rev J R Major MA FSA
Vol. 4. William Crookes
Vols. 5-12. Hugh Welch Diamond MD FSA
Vol. 13. Hugh Welch Diamond MD FSA and John Spiller FCS
Vol. 14. John Spiller FCS
Vol. 15. John Spiller FCS and H Baden Pritchard FCS
Vol. 16. H Baden Pritchard FCS and R J Friswell FCS
Vols. 17-23. Anon, but possibly William de Wiveleslie Abney
Vols. 24-. William de Wiveleslie Abney RE FRS (later Sir)

== Contents ==
The magazine was an important medium for the announcement and discussion of new discoveries, processes, and exhibitions. It also included ideas other photographers had to help improve their own practice, in a sort of "letter to the editor" style, as well as responses to questions. In addition, it also had a strong interest in scientific photography, particularly under Abney's editorship. From January 1948, the Photographic Journal was split into Part A: Pictorial and Section B: Scientific. In 1953 the latter became the Journal of Photographic Science, now The Imaging Science Journal.

== Availability ==
The magazine is available to members of the society and to institutions on subscription. Runs of the magazine are available in major libraries in the United Kingdom, including the British Library and in the society's own library housed at the National Media Museum. However, complete runs are rare and as a consequence the society decided to digitise the magazine. In January 2014 it was announced that the magazine had been digitised from 1853 and would be made freely available through the Society's website. The RPS Journal is freely available from 1853 to 2012 in a searchable form at: http://archive.rps.org/
