= Cundell =

Cundell is a surname. Notable people with the surname include:

- Edric Cundell (1893–1961), British music teacher, composer and conductor
- Henry Cundell (1810–1886), Scottish painter, artist, and early photographer
- Len Cundell (1879–1939), English horse trainer
- Nora Cundell (1889–1948), English painter
- Pamela Cundell (1920–2015), English character actress

== See also ==
- Cundall (disambiguation)
