= Joseph Forrester =

Joseph Forrester may refer to:

- Joe Forrester, an American crime/drama television series
- Joseph James Forrester (1809–1861), English merchant and wine shipper
