= Daniel Davis Jr. =

American photographer, daguerreotypist and ambrotypist

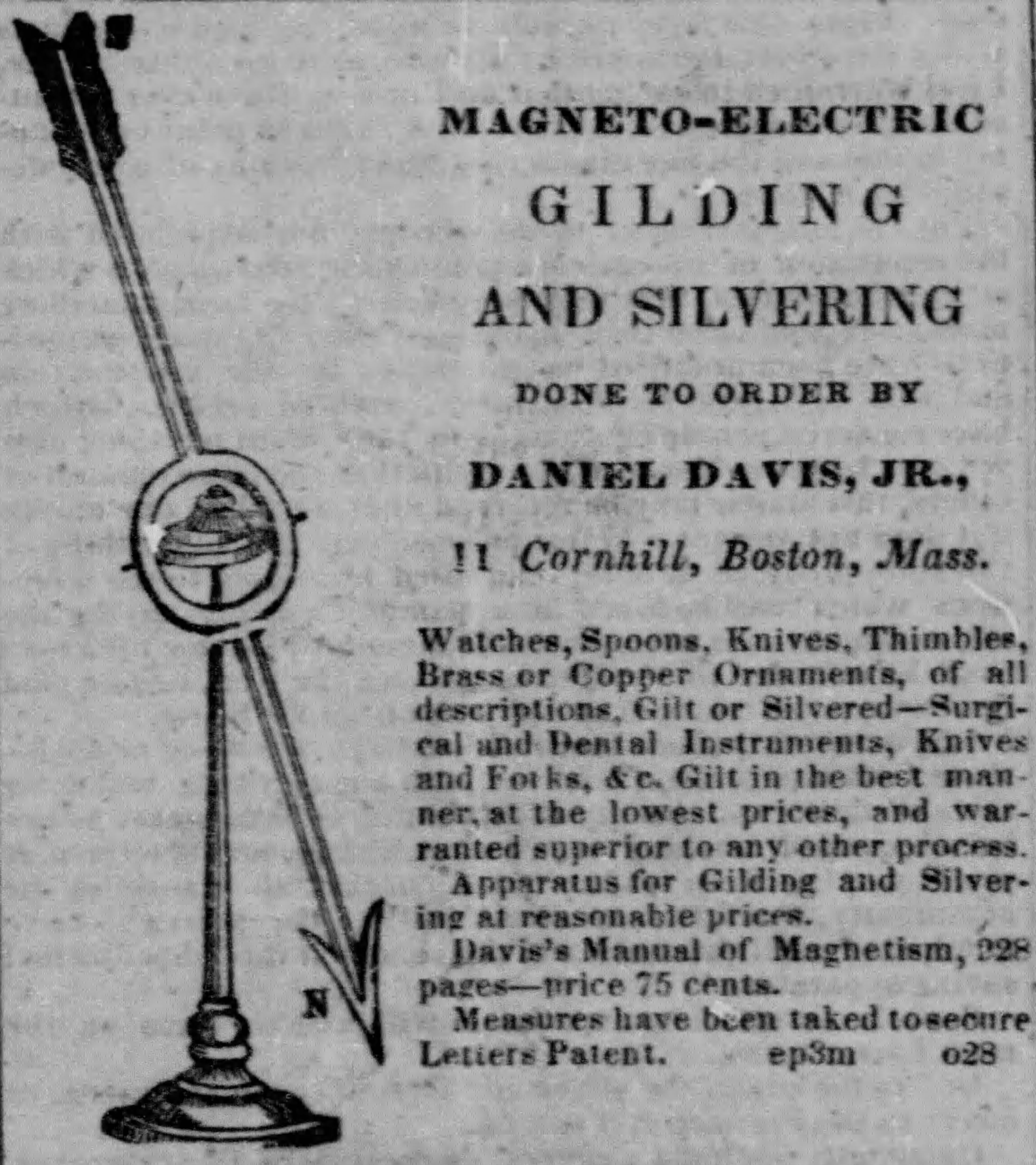
1842 advertisement for Davis's company

Daniel Davis Jr. (1813–1887) was an American photographer, daguerreotypist and ambrotypist.

In 1842 Daniel Davis Jr. patented a method for colouring daguerreotypes through electroplating, and his work was refined by Warren Thompson the following year.

In 1842, Davis published the book Davis's Manual of Magnetism on the subject of electromagnetism and electricity.
