= Samuel Buckle =

English photographer (1808–1860)

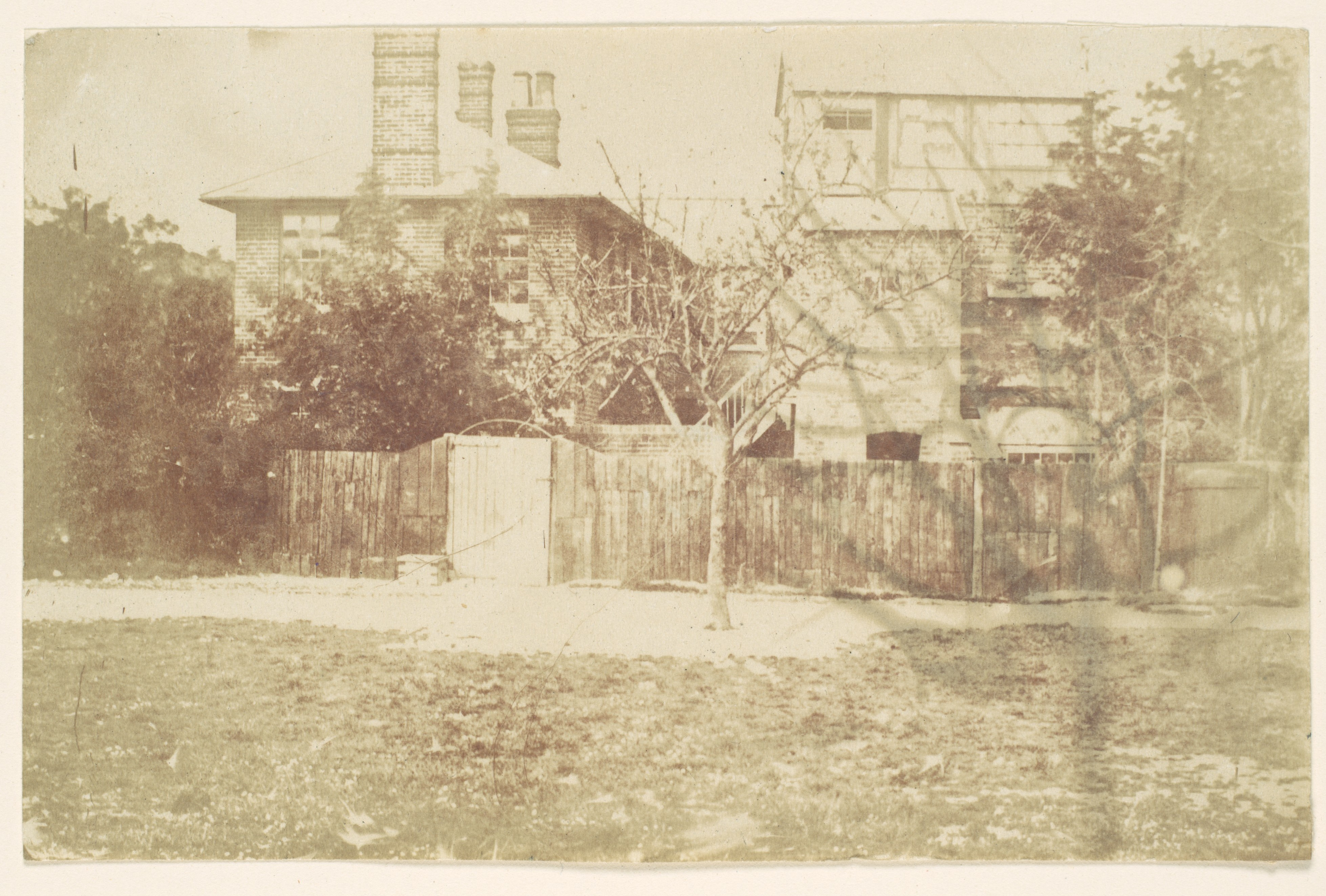
Tree in Yar

Samuel Buckle (14 September 1808 – 1860) was an early English photographer.

== Biography ==
Samuel Buckle was born in Orton Longueville in 1808 as the son of the jockey Francis Buckle. Samuel Buckle was the manager of a brewery in Peterborough between 1841 and 1853, when it was sold. In 1845 he married Anne Ball. They lived in Royal Leamington Spa from about 1853 until he died in 1860. He was seriously ill for the last years of his life.

== Photography ==
Buckle started experimenting with photography at least as early as 1851, and exhibited at The Great Exhibition of 1851, where he got a Council Medal (one of only two British photographers to receive this highest accolade), at the 1852 Exhibition of Recent Specimens of Photography, and other exhibitions until at least 1857. He had contacts with many other early English photographers, including Henry Fox Talbot. Most of his surviving work was made with the calotype process, but by 1858 he was working with the newer collodion process. He had his large laboratory and studio at the back of his house, where he had worked mostly for pleasure. Commercial photographs by Buckle are not known to exist, but he sold cameras and gave lessons in photography, a.o. to Thomas Hesketh Biggs and to Arthur Schomberg Kerr. He made no portraits but stuck to landscapes. In 1853, an album with 30 of his prints was produced. 9 Prints of his work were bought by Prince Albert in 1854. He was also the inventor of the "Buckle Brush", an easy tool made from a glass tube and some cotton wool, to coat calotype paper.
