= Hugh Owen (photographer) =

Early British photographer (1808–1897)

Hugh Owen (1808 – 1897) was one of the first generation of amateur photographers in the United Kingdom.

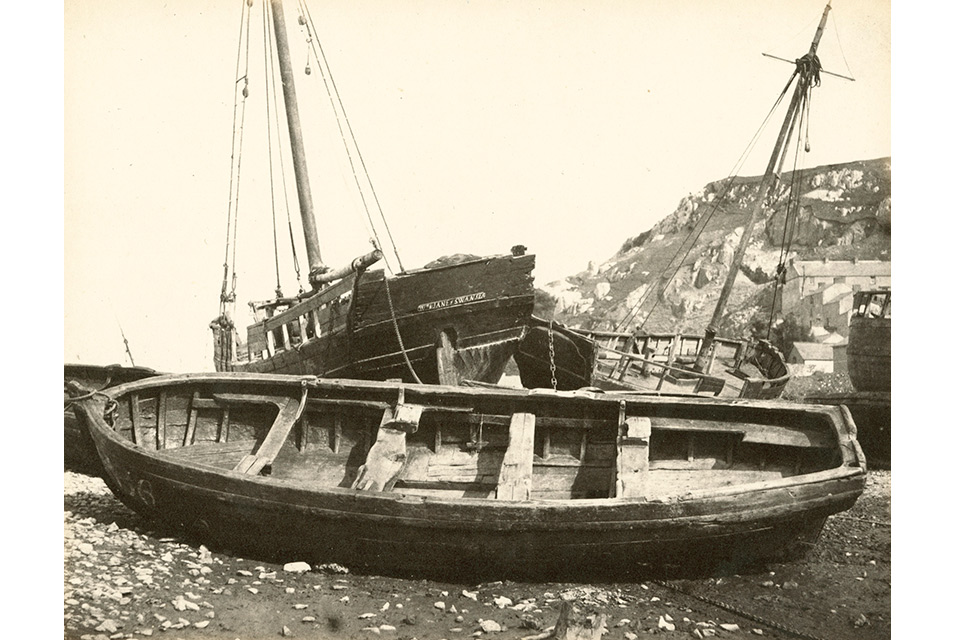
Photo of Oyster Boats by Owen

== Early life ==
Owen was born in September 1808 in Market Drayton, Shropshire, England and baptised in July 1809 as "Hugh Owen Jones son of Lydia Jones", indicating that he was illegitimate. His father, also Hugh Owen, was a British soldier who fought and eventually settled in Portugal. Moving to Bristol, Owen worked as chief cashier for the Great Western Railway of Isambard Kingdom Brunel. His first wife, Mary Anne, died in 1846 when Owen spilt alcohol on her dress and it caught fire from a candle. His interest in photography began shortly thereafter, said by some observers as being a coping mechanism after her death.

== Learning photography ==
It is likely that he was introduced to paper negative techniques by Henry Fox Talbot. He perfected the silver calotype process in experiments conducted at his Bristol home. This complex process involved sensitizing the paper with a silver nitrate solution to produce images upon wet plates. Owen's efforts rapidly received attention and he went on to be an early member of the Edinburgh Calotype Club in 1847. He was a founding member of the Photographic Society of London, attending its Inaugural Meeting on 20 January 1853. He was a vocal opponent of Frederick Scott Archer's collodion process, particularly after he badly stained his fingers in 1855, when using the chemicals required by that process, although the use of chemicals such as collodion would soon supersede the calotype process.

== The Great Exhibition ==
Owen's calotypes were exhibited at the Great Exhibition in London in 1851. His images so impressed the Commissioners that, along with his French contemporary Claude-Marie Ferrier, he was asked to make 155 photographs of the exhibits. More than 140 bound sets of reports and accompanying photographs known as the Exhibition of the Works of Industry of All Nations, 1851: Reports by the Juries on the Subjects in the Thirty Classes into which the Exhibition was Divided were presented to, among others, Queen Victoria, Heads of Foreign Governments, the Exhibition commissioners, and the British Museum. These remain Owen's most famous photographs, and provide a good insight into how he approached his work. He tended to concentrate on individual objects in sharp focus, contrasted with shadowed backgrounds.

Owen exhibited at the Royal Society of Arts in 1852 and a review in The Times listed him among the best photographers of the day. He rarely went too far from his Bristol home although he is known to have visited Portugal in 1853 or 1854, when he met the amateur photographer, Joseph James Forrester, and is likely to have also met another Porto-based photographer, Frederick William Flower. At this time he also met his father, possibly for the first time. Following his visit he wrote "Here and There in Portugal: Notes of the Present and the Past". Although he gave up photography relatively early, he remained active in historical preservation, authoring the well-received Two Centuries of Ceramic Art in Bristol. He left his collection of ceramics to the Bristol City Museum and Art Gallery. He became a Fellow of the Society of Antiquaries of London.

== Rediscovery ==
Owen died in 1897. Although his work has been relatively neglected by historians, there are several of his photographs housed in museums and private collections, in the City of Bristol archives, the Metropolitan Museum of Art, New York City; the J. Paul Getty Museum in Los Angeles; and the Los Angeles County Museum of Art.

Building on a collection of Owen's photographs made by the Bristol photographer and historian, Reece Winstone, an exhibition of his landscapes, entitled Hugh Owen Rediscovered, was held in New York City in 2016, the first exhibition devoted to his work since the 19th century. Winstone had been seeking copies of Owen's photographs since the 1950s. In 1962, an elderly gentleman, W. L. Venn, attended an exhibition by Winstone at the Bristol Cooperative Society. Venn had worked for the amateur archaeologist, Canon R. T. Cole and had purchased his collection of Owen's work when Cole died. He gave that album, containing 100 photographs, to Winstone for his collection, by leaving it at the reception of the Cooperative Society.
