= Joseph James Forrester =

English businessman in Portugal (1809–1861)

His Lordship The Baron of Forrester
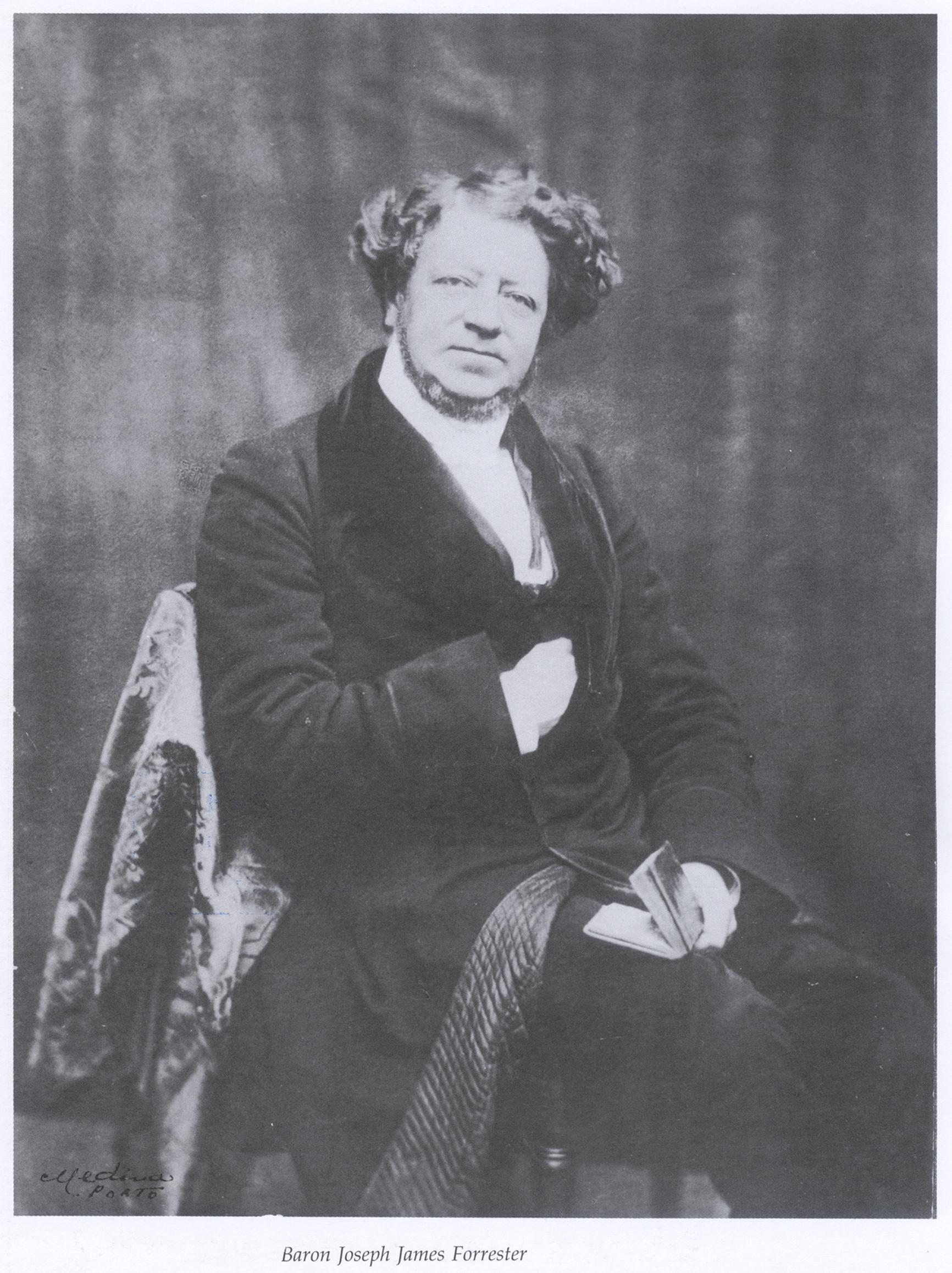
- Born: 27 May 1809; Kingston upon Hull, East Riding of Yorkshire, England
- Died: 12 May 1861 (aged 51); São João da Pesqueira, Viseu District, Portugal
- Occupation: Businessman

Joseph James Forrester, Baron of Forrester (27 May 1809 – 12 May 1861) was an English merchant and wine shipper.

== Biography ==
Forrester was born in Hull on 27 May 1809, of Scottish parentage. In 1831 he went to Oporto, Portugal to join his uncle, James Forrester, a partner in the house of Offley, Forrester, and Webber. He early devoted himself to the interests of his adopted country, and a laborious survey of the Douro, with a view to the improvement of its navigation, was one of the principal occupations of the first twelve years of his residence. The result was the publication in 1848 of a remarkable map of the Douro river from Vilvestre, on the Spanish frontier, to its mouth at St. João da Foz (Oporto), on a scale of 4½ inches to the Portuguese league. Its merit was universally recognized, commendatory resolutions were voted by the Municipal Chamber of Oporto, the Agricultural Society of the Douro, and other public bodies, while its adoption as a national work by the Portuguese government gave it the stamp of official approbation. It was supplemented by a geological survey and by a separate map of the port wine district (Alto-Douro) showing the prominent wine farms (quintas), which was originally published in England in 1843 and reprinted in 1852 by order of a select committee of the House of Commons.

In 1844 Forrester published anonymously a pamphlet on the wine trade, entitled ‘A Word or two on Port Wine,’ of which eight editions were rapidly exhausted. This was the first step in his endeavors to obtain a reform of the abuses practiced in Portugal in the making and treatment of port wine, and the remodeling of the peculiar legislation by which the trade was regulated. To these abuses and to the restrictions enforced by the Douro Wine Company in right of a monopoly created in 1756 he attributed the depression in the port wine trade. The taxation on export imposed by this body was exceedingly heavy, while an artificial scarcity was created by the arbitrary limitation of both the quantity and quality allowed to be exported. The author of the pamphlet was easily identified and bitterly attacked by the persons interested. The inhabitants of the wine country, however, supported him warmly, and he received addresses of thanks from 102 parishes of the Upper Douro.

Forrester was a skilled artist and also became a pioneer of photography in Portugal, together with Frederick William Flower, who also lived in Porto. Forrester had a house built in Vila Nova de Gaia, which contained a photographic studio. His first contact with photography probably took place when fellow Scotsman David Octavius Hill took six photographs of him sometime between 1844 and 1846. He was friends with Hugh Owen, a pioneer of photography who visited Oporto in the 1850s, and also received lessons from Hugh Welch Diamond in London. Forrester became a member of the Photographic Society of London, being elected on 6 July 1854, just 18 months after its establishment. Many of his photographs survive.

The prize of fifty Guineas offered by Benjamin Oliveira, MP, for the best essay on Portugal and its commercial capabilities was awarded in 1853 to Joseph James Forrester for an admirable treatise, which went through several editions and is still a standard work. In 1852 he gave valuable evidence before the select committee of the House of Commons on the wine duties, detailing at greater length all the abuses summarized in his pamphlet. He continued to write on this and other practical subjects, publishing tracts on the vine disease, improved manufacture of olive oil, etc., and was awarded by the commissioners of the Universal Exhibition in Paris in 1855 the silver medal of the first class and five diplomas of honorable mention for the collection of publications and products he there exhibited.

On 12 May 1861 the boat in which he was descending the Douro was swamped in one of the rapids, and he was drowned. The body was never found. The ships in Lisbon and Oporto hoisted their colours half-mast high on receipt of the news, and all public buildings showed similar signs of mourning. In the wine country he is still remembered as the 'protector of the Douro'. A memorial was erected in the churchyard of St James' Church, Porto.

An interesting sketch of his home in Oporto is contained in ‘Les Arts en Portugal,’ by Count Raczynski, who records a visit paid to him in August 1844. He left six children, but had been a widower for many years before his death. There is an excellent portrait of him, a large print in lithography, by Baugniet of London, 1848.

He was named Baron de Forrester for life by Ferdinand II of Portugal in 1855. Forrester was also made knight commander of the orders of Christ and Isabella la Catolica, and received the cross of chevalier of various orders of his adopted country. He was member of the Royal Academies of Lisbon and Oporto, of the Royal Academy of Sciences of Turin, of the English Society of Antiquaries, of the Royal Geographical Societies of London, Paris, and Berlin, and received the highest gold medals reserved for learned foreigners by the pope and by the emperors of Russia, Austria, and France. Charles Albert, king of Piedmont, during his residence in Oporto, not long before his death, detached from his own breast the cross of SS. Maurice and Lazarus, worn by him throughout his campaigns, in order to affix it to the coat of Baron de Forrester.
