= Douro Wine Company =

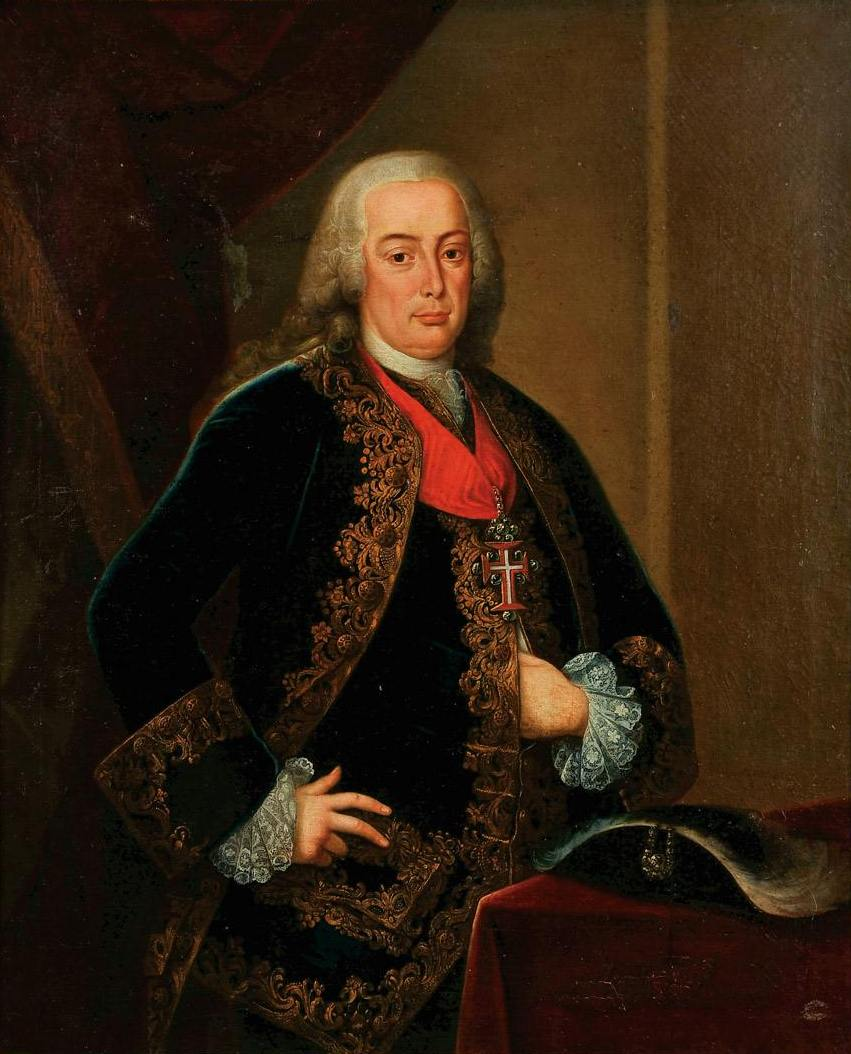
The Douro Wine Company was founded by the Portuguese Prime Minister, the Marquis of Pombal, to bring more Portuguese control and oversight to the Port wine trade.

The Douro Wine Company (also known as the General Company of Agriculture of the Wines of the Upper Douro and in Portuguese Companhia Geral da Agricultura e Vinhos do Alto Douro) was a government oversight organization established by the Portuguese Prime Minister Sebastião José de Carvalho e Melo, Marquis of Pombal to regulate the trade and production of Port wine. Established in 1756, one of the first official duties of the company was the delineation of the boundaries of the Douro wine region. This act essentially made the Douro the world's first regional appellation. While the boundaries of the Chianti and Tokaji wine regions were outlined in 1716 and 1737, respectively, neither of these regions were "technically" appellations in the sense of being subjected to continued government control and regulations. Under their charter, Pombal invested an immense amount of control in the Douro Wine Company to regulate all exports of Port, set production quantities limits, fix maximum and minimum prices for grapes and to serve as sole arbitrator in any disputes between vine growers and Port shippers. In 1761, the company was further granted a monopoly on the sale of brandy which was used in the fortification process of Port winemaking. The Douro Wine Company continued to operate to 1833 (and was briefly revived from 1843 and 1853). Today, many of it functions have been deregulated with the Instituto dos Vinhos do Douro e do Porto or (Port and Douro Wines Institute) being the official regulating body of Port wine and Douro table wine production.

== Background ==
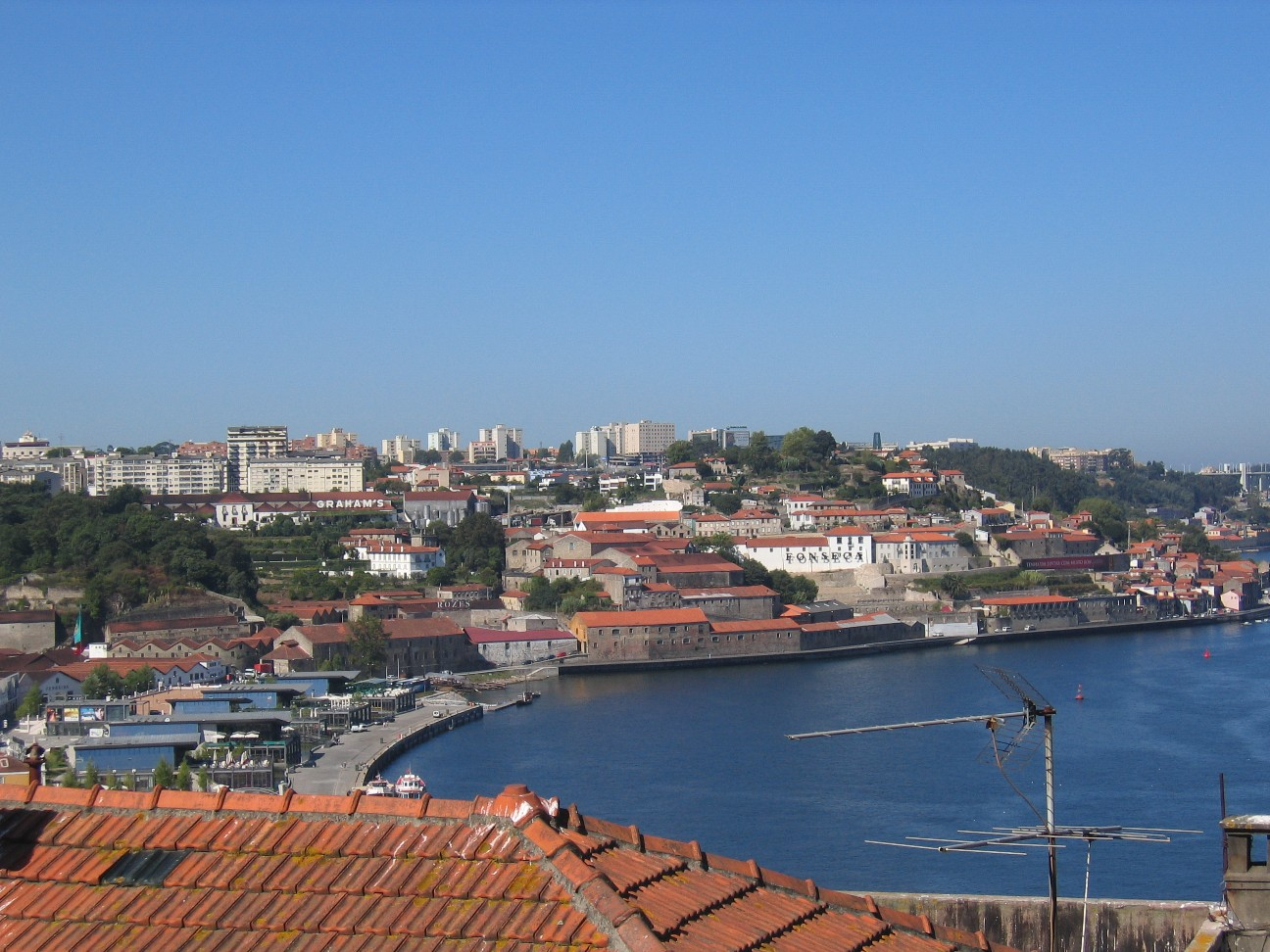
In the 17th and early 18th century, British wine merchants worked to consolidate their control over the Port wine industry which included building large warehouses in Vila Nova de Gaia (pictured) where they could store long term wine they bought on credit from Portuguese growers.

Since the 17th century, British wine merchants had been consolidating their power over the Portuguese wine trade—particularly in the Douro region, which produced the style of wine that included some addition of brandy, which was becoming popular in the London market. The 1703 Methuen Treaty between England and Portugal had both direct and indirect effects on the Portuguese wine industry. The treaty not only stipulated that the amount of duties on Portuguese wines was to never be more than two-thirds that of which was levied on French wines, it also allowed English woolen cloth to be admitted into Portugal free of duty. This second stipulation ended up having a devastating effect on the Portuguese textile industry, leading to huge numbers of shepherds and weavers becoming unemployed. In and around the Douro region, this segment of labor turned to the wine industry and encouraged a boom in vineyard planting. Over the next few decades the resulting grape surplus, coupled with some unscrupulous examples of wine fraud and adulteration, led to a general decline in Port quality and a depression in prices.

The British wine merchants used this opportunity to leverage their strength in order to maximize profits. In 1727, they grouped together to form a trade association and built the Factory House, a private gentlemen's club, where they could meet and collude on details pertaining to the wine trade. They bought all the wine from growers on credit, holding off payment till the wine was sold. They built large warehouses in Vila Nova de Gaia where they could keep the wine for years aging. Less than scrupulous shippers also committed widespread wine fraud by importing grapes from regions outside the Douro to blend, as well as adding non-grape based wine ingredients like elderberry juice for coloring and dried pimentos to add spicy flavors. These tactics increased the leverage of the British shippers and meant they could set whatever prices they wanted to pay the Portuguese grape growers. To ensure more fair pricing, the growers often had to resort to more unorthodox business dealings such as the prostitution of their daughters to the British shippers.

Complaints and dissatisfaction with the business practices of the British made their way to the Portuguese government. Following the 1755 Lisbon earthquake, the Prime Minister of Portugal, the Marquis of Pombal, saw an opportunity to reestablish Portuguese control over the Port wine industry. The lucrative revenues from the Port wine trade were needed to rebuild the country in the aftermath of the earthquake and the Marquis sought out ways to interject more Portuguese influence over the process. His efforts lead to the founding of the Douro Wine Company and investing it with massive amounts of control, taking away the pricing leverage of the British shippers and reducing their role essentially to being "middlemen".

== Early actions ==
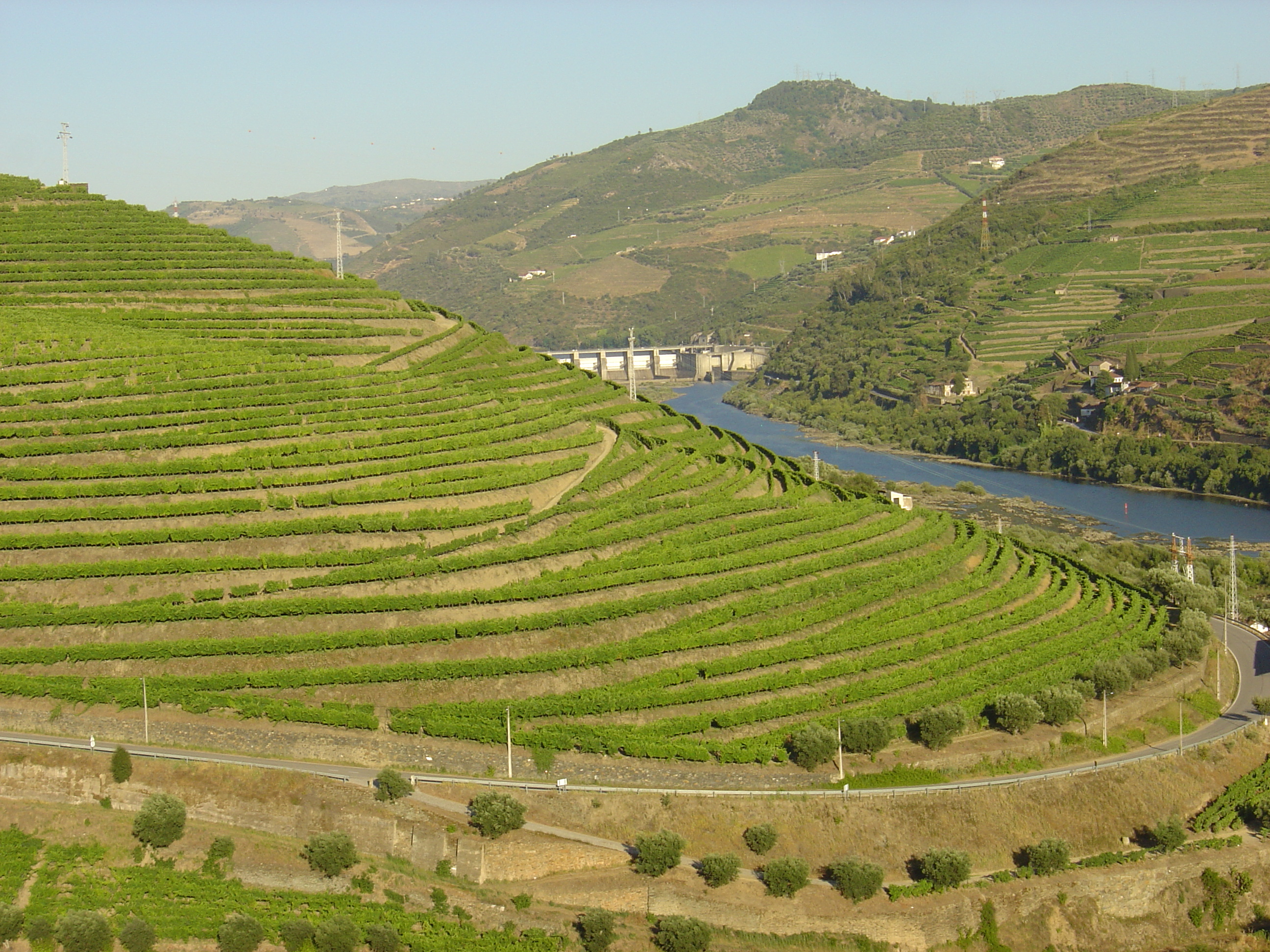
One of the first actions of the Douro Wine Company was to delineate the boundaries of the Douro wine region, making it the world's first regional appellation that was continuously regulated by a governing body.

One of the first actions of the Douro wine company was to respond to the "scandal" and wine frauds that contributed to the overall depression in sales and pricing of Port wine. Uninhibited and reckless blending of inferior wine and foreign ingredients contributed to many substandard examples of Port flooding the London market. To reestablish the reputation of Port, the Douro Wine Company first delineated the exact boundaries of Douro and dictating what areas could and could not produce Port. Under the guidance of Pombal, they specified the areas the contained predominately schistous soil along the Douro river and its tributaries. This distinguished the areas from the outcrops of granite that flanked the region and produced Port wine grapes of lesser quality. Pombal also specified this delineation to ensure that grapes were not planted where corn itself needed to be produced, which was a sorely needed food crop. This delineation essentially made the Douro the world's first regional appellation.

The company banned the use of elderberry juice and other adulterants, going so far as to mandate that all elderberry trees in the Douro be ripped out. The use of manure as fertilizer was prohibited, which served the benefit of limiting yields that would not only flood the market with over supply but also produce lower quality grapes. The Douro Wine Company further demarcated and classified the production of Port vineyards into two broad categories. The highest rated vineyards were designated as feitoria and were destined for the important British wine market and northern Europe. The remaining vineyards were designated as ramo and used for domestic consumption as well as export to the Portuguese colony of Brazil.

Under the company's charter and by individual grants by Pombal, the Douro Wine Company soon came to wield enormous power of the Port wine trade. They had complete control over mandating production limits by individual vineyards and set maximum and minimum prices that the British wine shippers would pay for their grapes. The company also employed "tasters" to ensure that all wine labeled as feitoria passed certain quality standards or else it could not be imported. In 1761, Pombal gave the company a complete monopoly over the sale of Portuguese brandy to be used in the fortification process. Control of the Port wine trade was almost completely in Portuguese hands, with the exception of the British shippers who were still the primary warehouse holders and exporters. Stipulations in the charter of the Douro Wine Company mandated that all officers of the company be Portuguese but eventually foreign nationals were allowed to become shareholders in the company.

== Criticisms ==
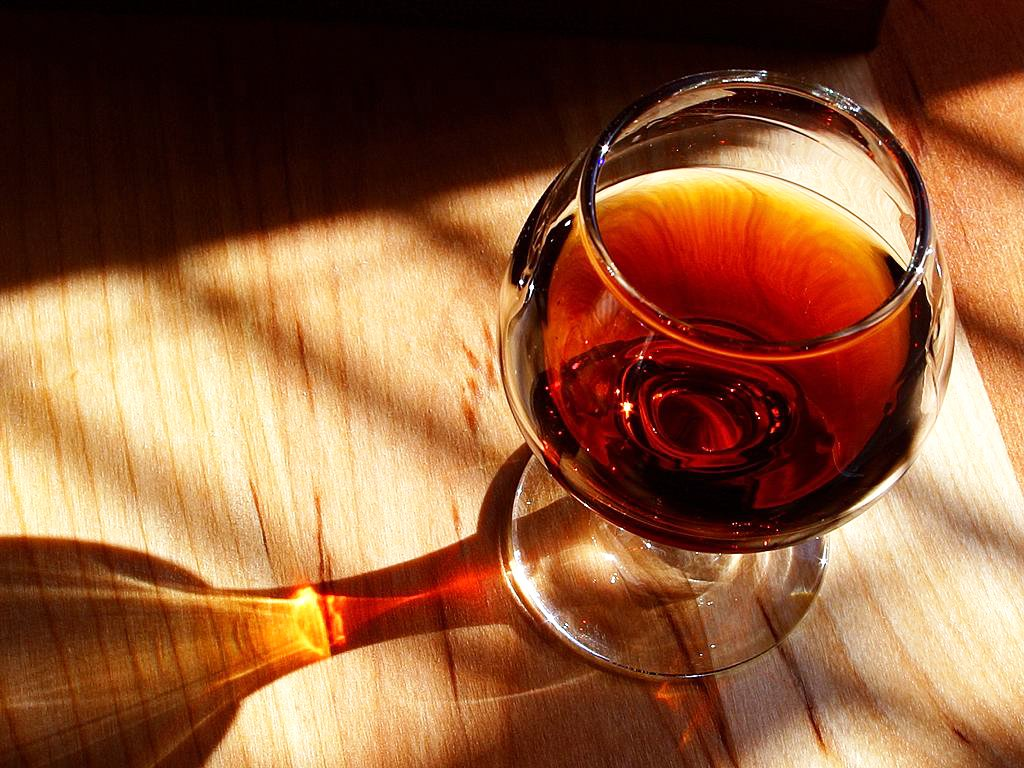
The fact that the Douro Wine Company also bought and sold Port wine on the international market led to charges of the company having a conflict of interest.

The British were early and vocal critics of the Douro Wine Company. With its founding, they lost substantial control of their near monopoly of the Port wine trade. As wine historian Hugh Johnson notes "...they were now reduced to mere middlemen who were told what they could buy and at what price, and where they could sell it." Since the Douro Wine Company also bought wine and sold it to shippers on the international market, they were criticized for having a distinct conflict of interest in their role as regulators. Other criticism circulated around the Marquis of Pombal himself who was granted certificates of authenticity by the Douro Wine Company for "port" produced at his estate in Carcavelos outside Lisbon even though it was clearly outside the official boundaries of the Douro wine region.

One vocal critic of the Douro Wine Company was the British winemaker Joseph James Forrester. Despite being British, Forrester was well integrated into the Portuguese community and even received the title "Baron" for his work in defending the Portuguese wine growers and creating the first extensive maps of the Douro river and its wine region. In his 1844 pamphlet "A Word or Two about Port Wine" he criticized the Douro Wine Company for its control over the Port wine industry and its encouragement of producers to add substantial amounts of brandy to the wine. In Forrester's view, the best wines of the Douro were "natural"-meaning without fortification or, if used, in very small amounts. With its monopolistic control over the brandy used in fortification, it was in the Douro Wine Company's interest to encourage extensive fortification.

== Later history ==
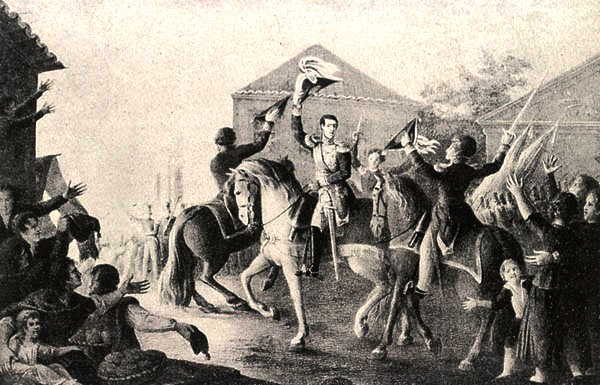
Miguelites, loyal to the former King of Portugal Miguel I, blew up the brandy storage depot of the Douro Wine Company which led to nearly 3.4 million US gallons (13,000 m^{3}) of boiling hot Port flooding into the Douro river.

The Douro Wine Company continued to function until 1833 (though it was briefly revived from 1843 to 1853). By the mid-19th century, the tight restriction on the Port wine trade and (in particular) its monopoly on brandy was creating contempt among the Portuguese themselves. In 1852, the Douro region was seized by Miguelites loyal to the former King of Portugal, Dom Miguel. During the 18-month siege, the Miguelites blew up the brandy storage depot of the Douro Wine Company. With the warehouses of several Port shippers nearby, the fires quickly spread with an estimated 27,000 pipes (between 12,825,000 and 12,960,000 litres; over 3.4 million US gallons) of boiling hot Port wine flooding the streets and flowing into the Douro river.

The Company was broken up and many of its powers were subsumed by other organizations, some public and some private. Today the primary government regulating body of the Douro is the Instituto dos Vinhos do Douro e do Porto or IVDP.

== See also ==
- History of Portuguese wine
