= Cundall =

Cundall may refer to:

- Cundall, North Yorkshire, a hamlet in England
- Cundall Johnston and Partners, a multi-disciplinary engineering consultancy
- Peter Cundall (1927–2021), horticulturalist and television personality in Australia
- James Cundall (born 1959), British theatrical producer
- Joseph Cundall (1818–1895), Victorian English writer, under the pseudonym of "Stephen Percy"

== See also ==
- Cundell
