= Auguste Gendron =

French painter

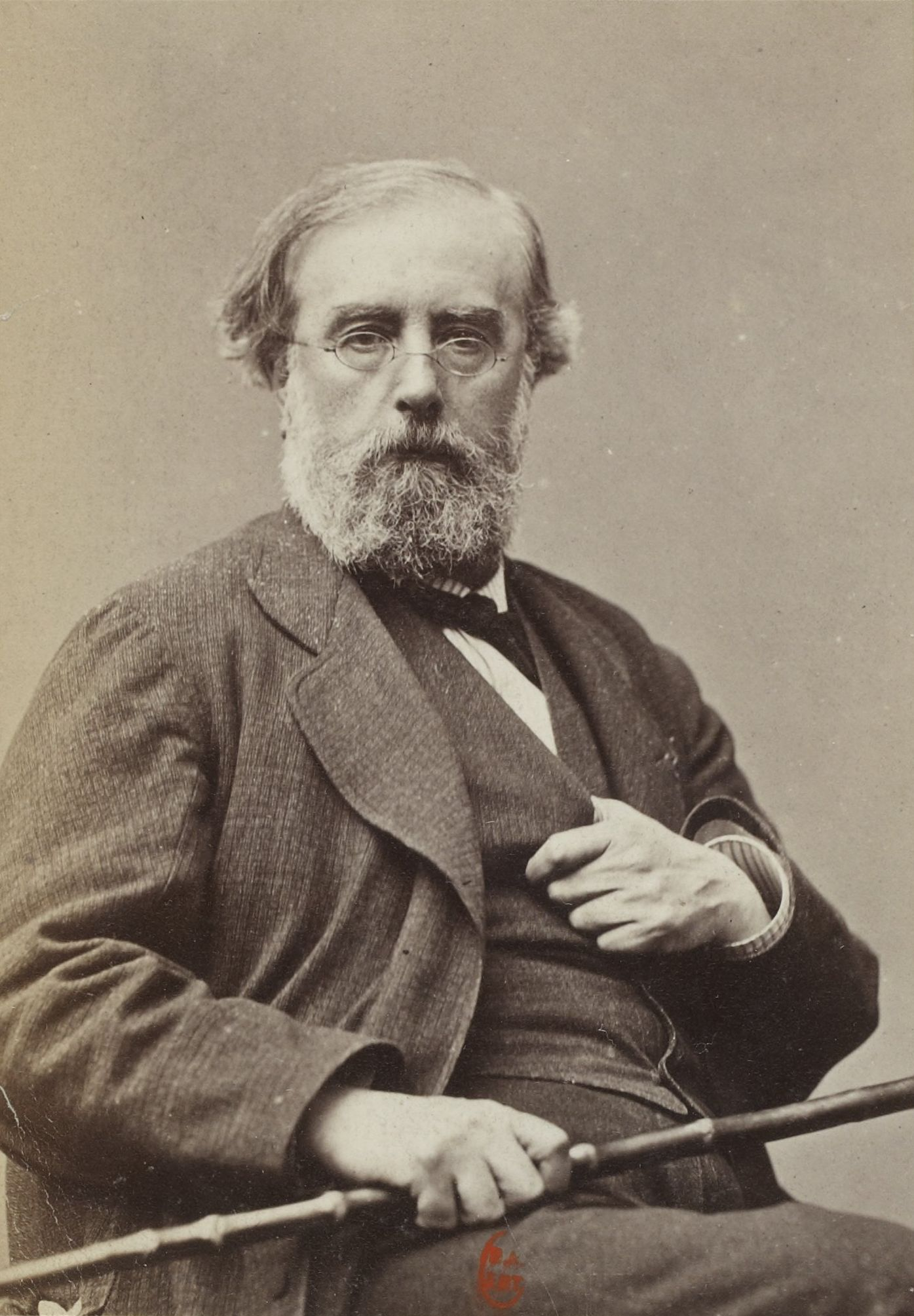
Photograph of Gendron by Robert Jefferson Bingham

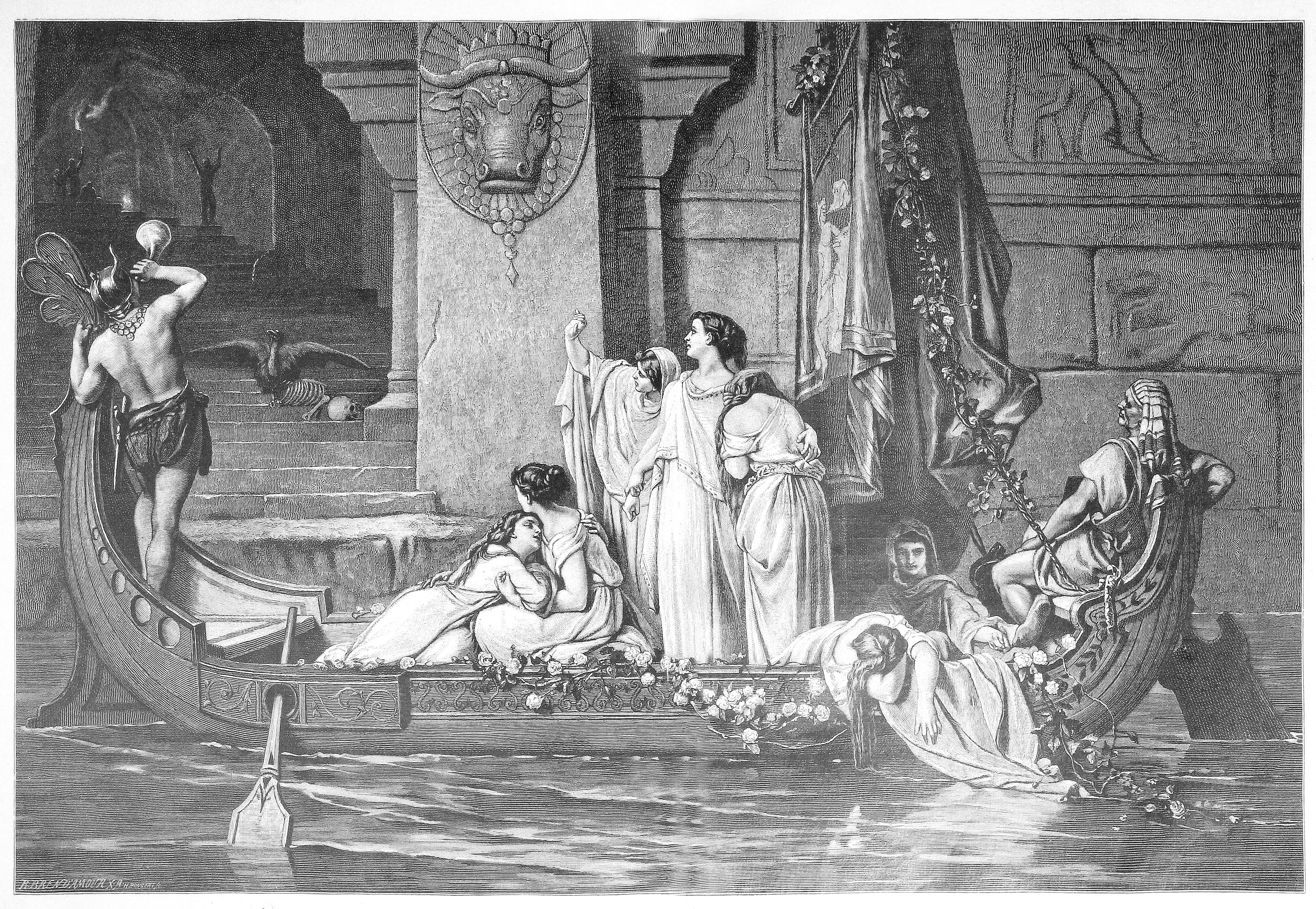
Victims to the Minotaur, print after a painting by Gendron

Auguste Gendron, also known as Ernest Augustin Gendron (17 March 1817 – 12 July 1881) was a French painter.

Born in Paris in 1817, he learned painting under Paul Delaroche. Gendron painted mainly mythological subjects in an academic style, and exhibited at the Salon in Paris for many years. Between 1844 and 1847, he travelled in Italy with Delaroche and the younger painter Jean-Léon Gérôme. He won multiple medals at the Salon. In 1855 he was made a Knight in the Legion of Honour.

A series of 12 panels, commissioned for the Palais d'Orsay, was lost after the building was demolished. Other paintings were commissioned for the State Ministry in Saint-Cloud, and for the Saint Catherine chapel in the St-Gervais-et-St-Protais church.

== Collections ==
Works by Gendron can be found in many collections, including the Louvre, the Museum of modern art André Malraux - MuMa, the Museum of Saint-Maur-des-Fossés, and the Dahesh Museum of Art.
