= William Thoms =

British writer (1803–1885)

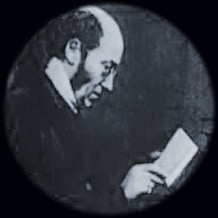
William Thoms

William John Thoms (16 November 1803 – 15 August 1885) was a British writer credited with coining the term "folklore" in 1846. Thoms' investigation of folklore and myth led to a later career of debunking longevity myths, and he was a pioneer demographer.

== Career ==
He was born on 16 November 1803.

Thoms worked as an antiquary, and miscellaneous writer, for many years a clerk in the secretary's office of Chelsea Hospital. He was made a fellow of the Society of Antiquaries and became secretary to the Camden Society in 1838. In 1845, he was appointed Clerk to the House of Lords, and subsequently Deputy Librarian at the House of Lords Library. In 1849, he founded the quarterly journal Notes and Queries, which for some years he also edited.

His first book, Early Prose Romances (3 vol. 1827-1828), was published with encouragement from Francis Douce, and gave versions of English tales such as "Robert the Devyl, Thomas a Reading, Friar Bacon, Friar Rush, Virgilius, Robin Hood, George a Green, Tom a Lincolne, Helyas, and Dr. Faustus". Among his publications are Lays and Legends (1834), The Book of the Court (1838), Gammer Gurton's Famous Histories (1846), Gammer Gurton's Pleasant Stories (1848). He also edited John Stow's Survey of London in 1842.

Thoms was also an early amateur photographer and Notes and Queries regularly carried reports on photography in its pages. He exhibited in the 1852 Society of Arts exhibition of photographs and was a founder member of the Photographic Society of London in 1853 exhibiting in its 1854 and 1855 exhibitions

In the 1870s, William Thoms began investigating claims to "ultra-centenarianism." He is credited with first formulating the concept that claims of very old age are typically exaggerated. His book Human Longevity: Its Facts and Fictions (1873) laid down some rules for validating longevity claims.

Thoms died on 15 August 1885 and is buried in Brompton Cemetery, London.

== Folk-Lore ==
Thoms is associated with many publications, as editor, compiler or author. He used the pseudonym Ambrose Merton for several works.

Thoms is credited with inventing the term "folklore" in an 1846 letter to the Athenaeum. He invented this compound word to replace the various other terms used at the time, including "popular antiquities" or "popular literature". He was fond of the works of Jacob Grimm, which he considered remarkable.

Thoms' letter to the Athenaeum led to the creation of a column on 'Folk-Lore' written by Thoms, which ran in the journal from 1846 to 1849.

He began a column titled Folk-Lore in Charles Wentworth Dilke's Athenaeum in 1846. Charles Wentworth Dilke, the publisher of the Athenaeum encouraged Thoms to begin a new journal, Notes and Queries, which was launched in 1849. Thoms remained editor of Notes and Queries until 1872, also writing a column in the journal on Folk-Lore. It has been calculated that during this time, Thoms published around three thousand separate notes and queries under the heading of Folk-Lore. This corpus has been hailed as one of Thoms's "foremost achievements: the importance of which is heightened by the absence of any national folklore archive in England".

In July 1876, in response to a letter sent to Notes and Queries, Thoms replied by suggesting that "steps should be taken to form a society for collecting, arranging, and printing all the scattered bits of folk-lore which we read of in books and hear of in the flesh". His early attempt to produce a collection of folk tales, advertised as "Folk-Lore of England", did not appear, but his later antiquarian publications sometimes reprinted his articles and material from subscribers. The Folklore Society was eventually founded in 1878 and Thoms was a leading member of the Society in its early years.

== Works ==
The following is an incomplete list of works:

- The Book of the Court, 1838
- Anecdotes and Traditions illustrative of Early English History and Literature from Manuscript Sources, Camden Society 1839.
- Stow's Survey of London (London, 8vo), 1842 ed.
- He prepared for the Early English Poetry series (Percy Society) The History of Reynard the Fox, 1844, (Caxton in 1481)
- Gammer Gurton's Famous Histories of Sir Guy of Warwick, Sir Bevis of Hampton, Tom Hickathrift, Friar Bacon, Robin Hood, and the King and the Cobbler (Westminster, 16mo)
- Gammer Gurton's Pleasant Stories of Patient Grissel, the Princess Rosetta, and Robin Goodfellow, and ballads of the Beggar's Daughter, the Babes in the Wood, and Fair Rosamond (Westminster, 16mo).
- Primeval Antiquities of Denmark. London, 1849. translating Jens Jacob Asmussen Worsaae.
- Human Longevity, its Facts and its Fictions, including an inquiry into some of the more remarkable instances, and suggestions for testing reputed cases, illustrated by examples. London: J. Murray, 1873.
- The Longevity of Man. Its Facts and Its Fictions. With a prefatory letter to Prof. Owen, C.B., F.R.S. on the limits and frequency of exceptional cases. London: F. Norgate, 1879.

== See also ==
- Folklore
- Longevity claims
- Longevity myths
- Notes and Queries
- Supercentenarian
