= Frederick William Flower =

Pioneering British photographer living in Portugal

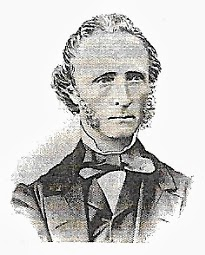
- Born: 22 February 1815; Leith, Scotland
- Died: 18 July 1889 (aged 74); Porto, Portugal
- Occupations: Wine producer and exporter
- Known for: Photography pioneer

Frederick William Flower (22 February 1815 – 18 July 1889) was a Scottish-Portuguese photographer. He is considered one of the pioneers of photography in Portugal. Most of his photographs from between 1849 and 1859 have been well-preserved.

== History ==
Frederick Flower was born on 22 February 1815 in Leith, Scotland, where his father had been sent to work. At an early age his parents moved back to England, living in Hull. It was from there that he sailed to Porto in 1834, where he took up a position with the Port wine exporters, Smith Woodhouse & Company. He stayed at the home of the owner of the company, Robert Woodhouse, as was customary for young Englishmen moving to Portugal to work in the wine trade. Following the death of his father, he was joined in Portugal in 1836 by his mother, brother and two younger sisters.

It is not known exactly when Flower took up photography or from where he obtained the necessary expertise. He was one of the first people in Portugal to use the salted paper and calotype processes developed by Henry Fox Talbot in England from the late 1830s. He may have learned of the calotype process from Joseph James Forrester, famous for mapping the Douro river, who took up amateur photography around 1853, although information was first made available in the Revista Literária published in Porto. Flower made most of his calotypes between 1853 and 1858. He was also the Portuguese pioneer of the use of strip photography. Flower is likely to have obtained his photographic supplies from British suppliers and received instructions along with those supplies.

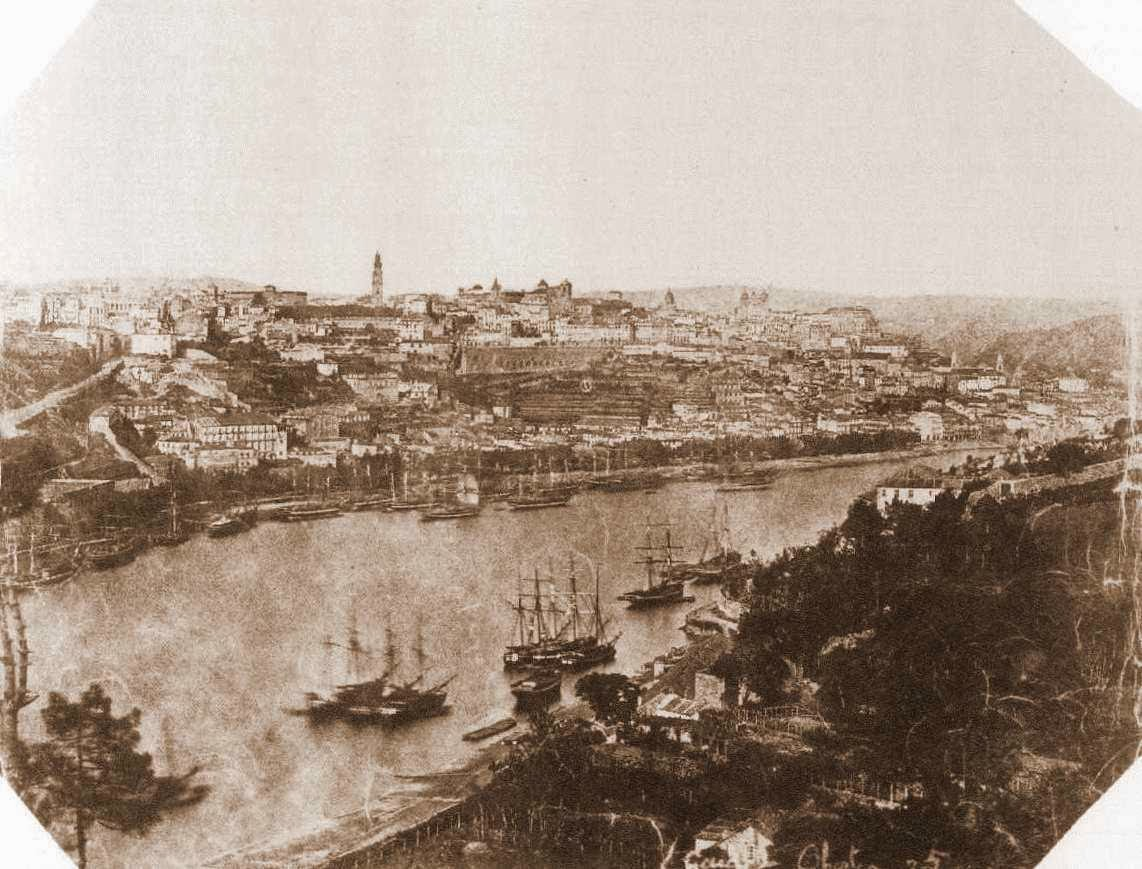
View of Porto taken by Flower in 1849

Flower prepared his own photographic emulsion and was known to sometimes touch up the negatives to create an artificial cloud effect. His photographs were usually taken in Porto and in Vila Nova de Gaia on the opposite bank of the Douro, where the port companies were based. However, he also travelled widely in northern Portugal. His photographs provide an important record of aspects of everyday life in Portugal at that time.

== Preservation and exhibition of photographs ==
Flower briefly returned to England in 1874 for health reasons but he and his wife returned to Porto later, where he died on 18 July 1889. For more than a century, Flower's direct descendants ensured the conservation of his photographs before donating them to the National Photography Archive of the General-Directorate of Cultural Heritage of Portugal. In 1928, his grandson, Harold M. Flower, commissioned new prints obtained from the calotypes and toured the north of Portugal to try to identify the places photographed by his grandfather. The family had carefully preserved the photographs, also collecting historical memories about its author. Although the Flower family remained an Anglo-Portuguese family, they never transferred the photographs to England. Whenever a member of the family returned to England, he or she deposited the collection with another family member who remained in Portugal. The calotype negatives have mainly survived in good condition, but some of the prints have not.

Because his photographs were retained by the family, Flower had been relatively unknown in Portugal, apart from through one or two magazine articles. This changed after the State acquired his photographs and an exhibition was held at the National Museum of Contemporary Art in Lisbon in 1994. The total collection consists of 216 calotypes and 101 proofs on salted paper (together with later proofs). This allowed the photographs to be appraised not just for their historical record but also for their artistic style, as noted by André Rouillé in the Exhibition Catalogue. An examination of the collection shows strong evidence of Flower's technical skills and mastery of photographic techniques as well as deliberate attempts to experiment.

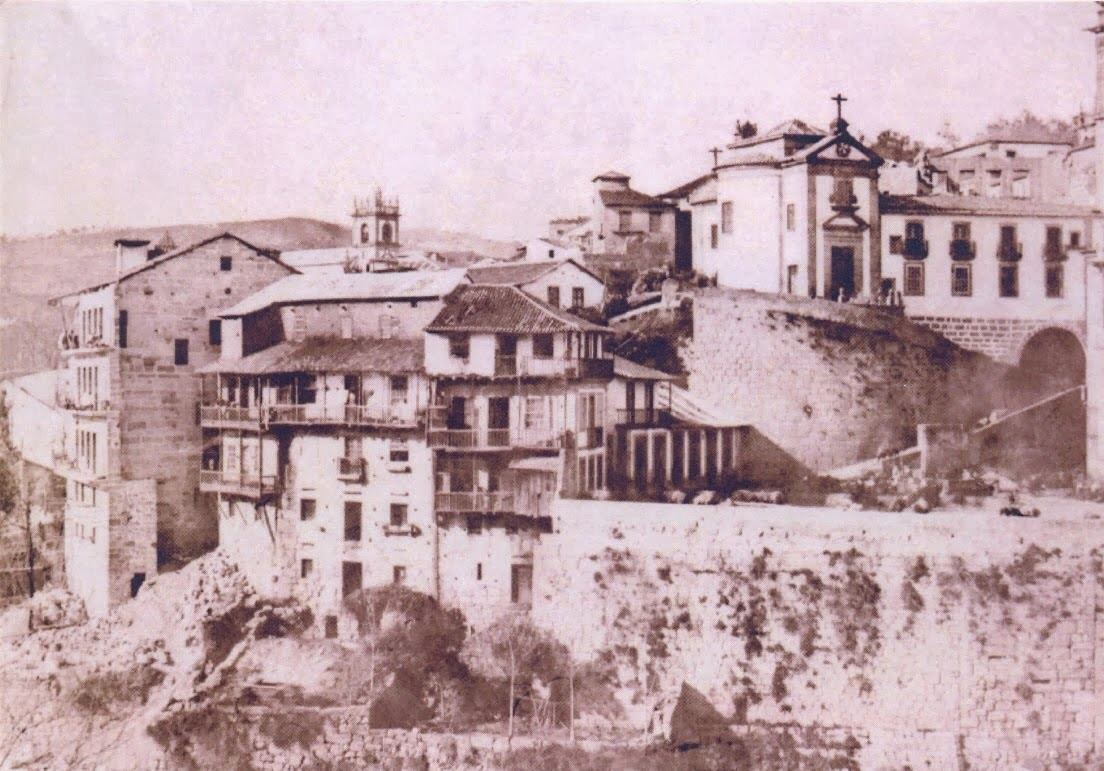
View of Amarante on the Tãmega River, North Portugal
