= Clare Harris (anthropologist) =

British anthropologist, art historian

Clare Elizabeth Harris, FBA (born 29 March 1965) is a British anthropologist, art historian, and academic, specialising in South Asia, Himalayas, and Tibet. She has been curator for Asian Collections at the Pitt Rivers Museum since 1998, and Professor of Visual Anthropology at the University of Oxford since 2014.

Harris was born in Wallingford, Oxfordshire, and educated at King Edward VI School, Bury St Edmunds, Robinson College, Cambridge (BA) and SOAS, University of London (MA, PhD). She was elected a Fellow of the British Academy (FBA), the United Kingdom's national academy for the humanities and the social sciences, in July 2019.
