= George Hilditch =

British artist

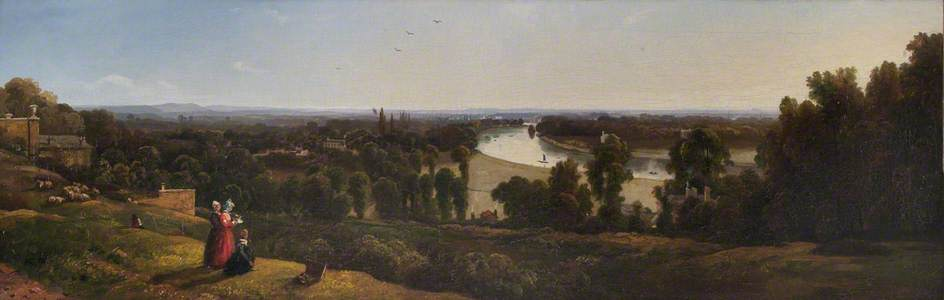
View from Richmond Hill

George Hilditch (1803–1857) was a British artist known for his landscape paintings. He was the son of a silk merchant from the City of London. As a child he frequently holidayed by the River Thames at Richmond then some miles west of London in Surrey. He also later stayed at Montpelier Row in Twickenham. While there he became a pupil of Thomas Christopher Hofland.

Hofland encouraged him to pursue a career as a painter and in 1823 he displayed his work for the first time at the age of twenty at the Royal Academy Exhibition of 1823 at Somerset House. He exhibited frequently at the Royal Academy and at the Society of Artists over the following decades. Hilditch particularly specialised in producing landscapes from or around Richmond Hill and became known as the "Richmond painter". He also worked in the new art of photography.

A number of his works are today in public collections.

== Gallery ==
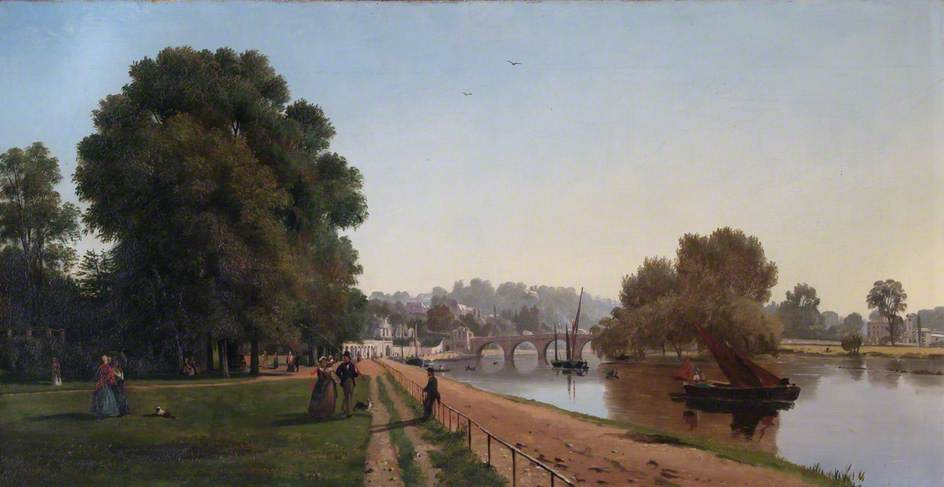
Cholmondeley Walk, Richmond

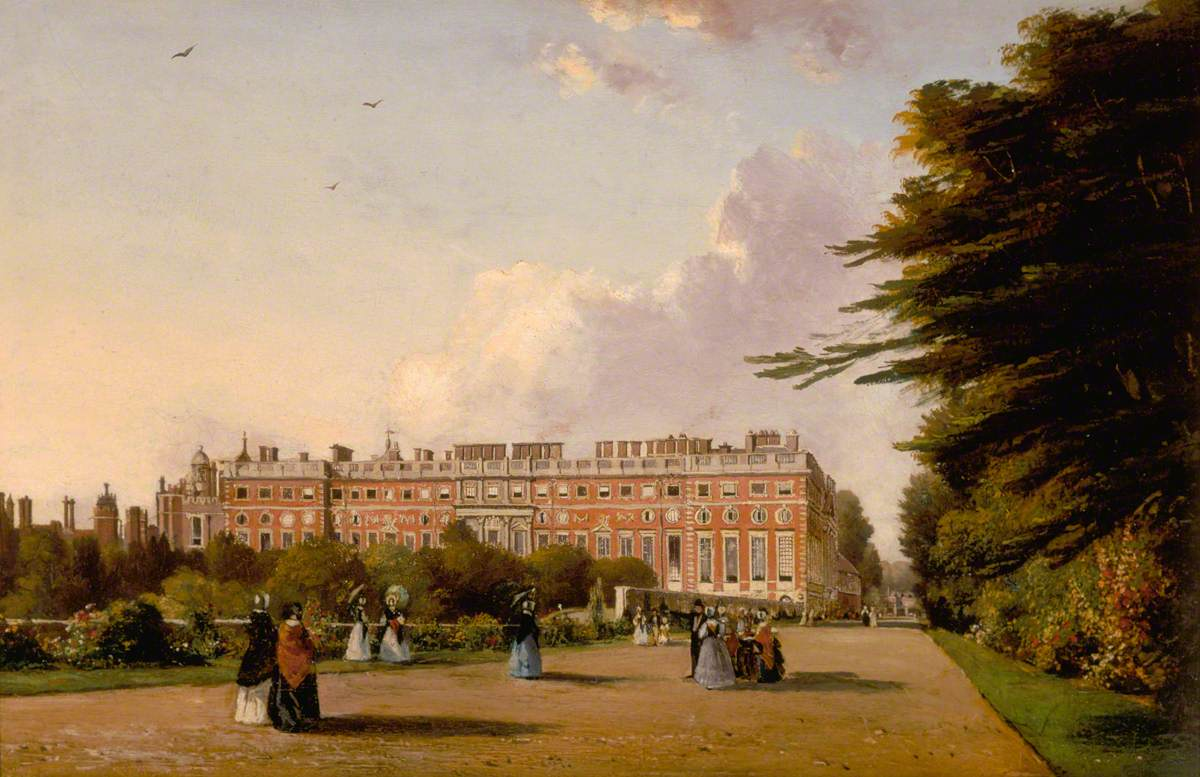
View of the South Front of Hampton Court Palace

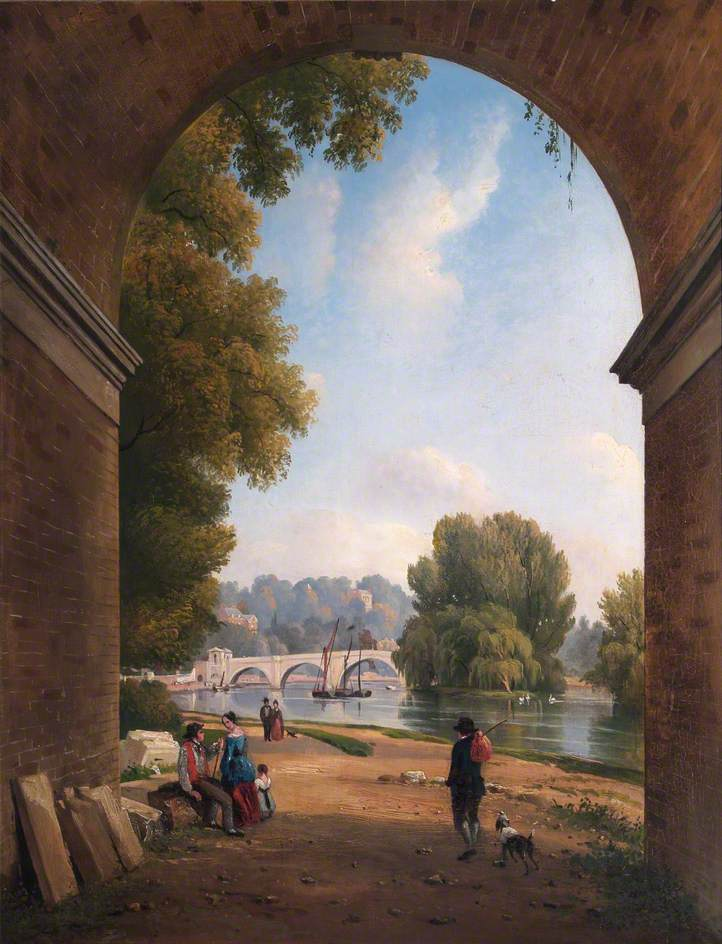
Richmond from Beneath the Railway Arch

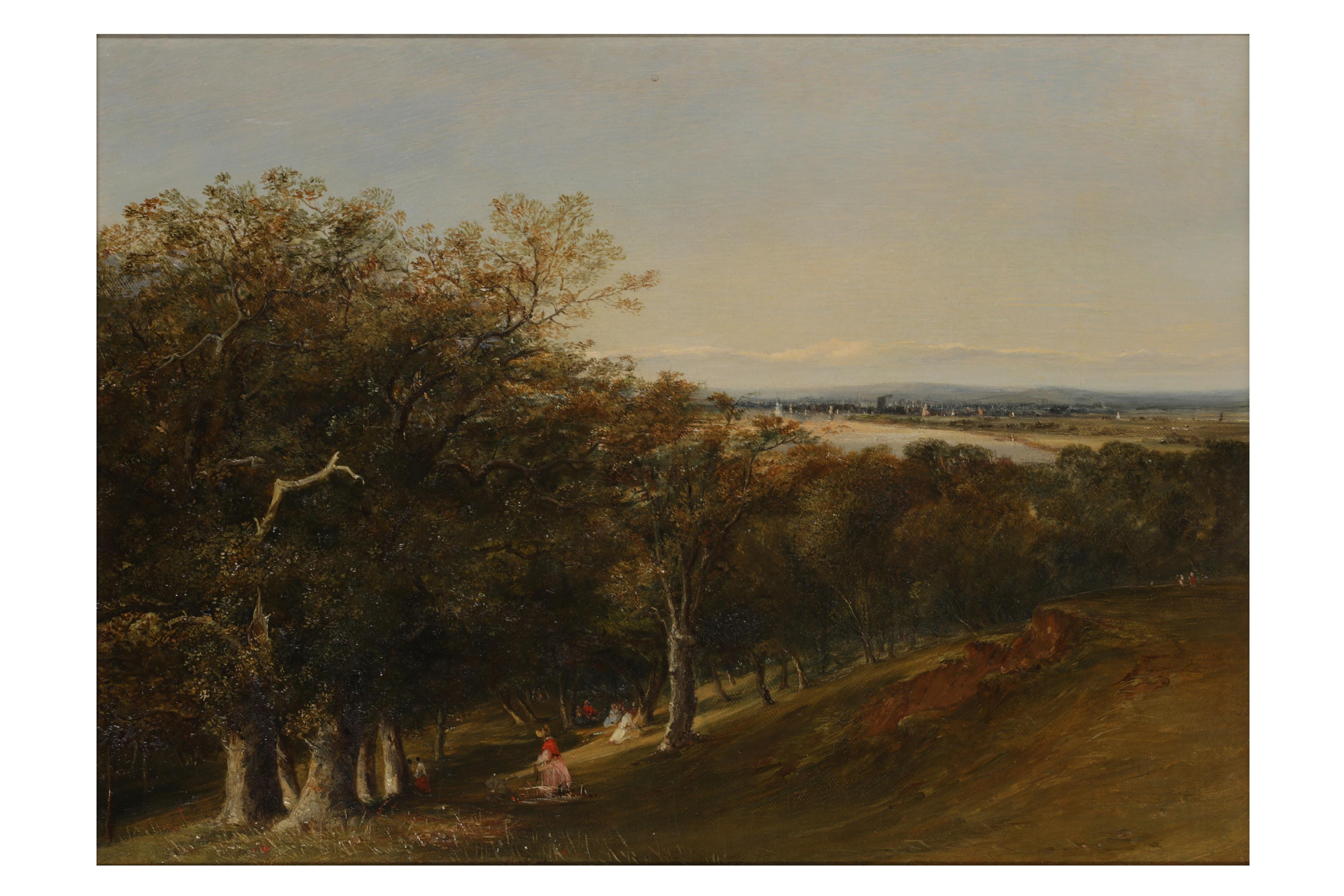
Picnicking above Greenwich

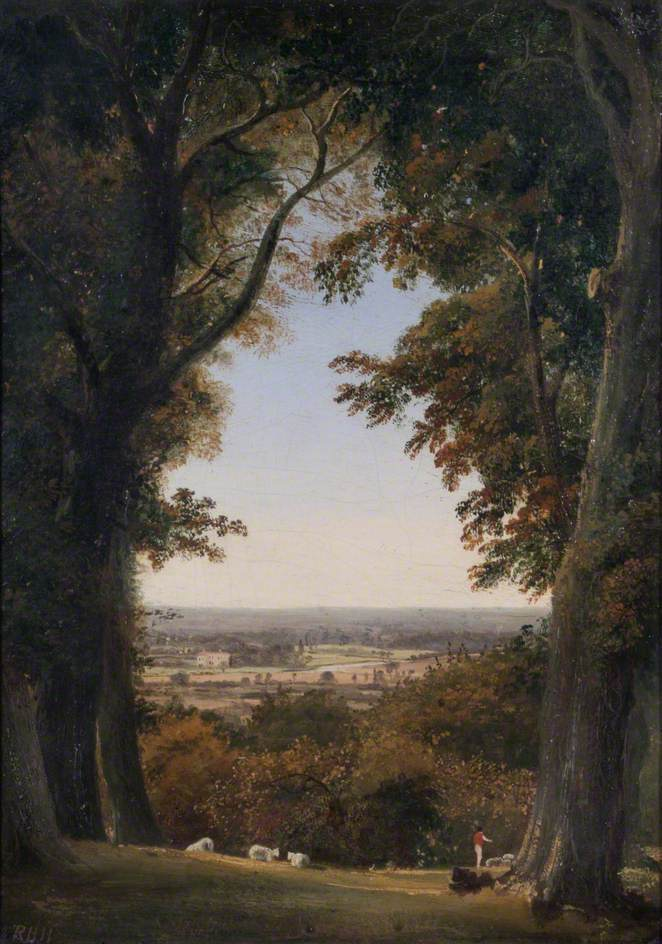
Distant View of Twickenham

== Bibliography ==
- Brigden, Tom. The Protected Vista: An Intellectual and Cultural History. Taylor & Francis, 2019.
- De Novellis, Mark. Highlights of the Richmond Borough Art Collection. Orleans House Gallery, 2002.
- Hannavy, John. Encyclopedia of Nineteenth-Century Photography. Taylor & Francis, 2013.
- Taylor, Roger. Impressed by Light: British Photographs from Paper Negatives, 1840-1860. Metropolitan Museum of Art, 2007.
