= Warren T. Thompson =

American photographer

Warren T. Thompson (active 1840–1870) was an American photographer. Between 1840 and 1846 Thompson worked in Philadelphia and in 1843 refined Daniel Davis Jr.'s electroplating method for colouring daguerreotypes by using a gum tragacanth resist. With this technique colours could be built up in the manner of some types of printmaking. According to an article in the 1892 American Journal of Photography by editor Julius Sachse, Thompson traveled to Paris in 1845 from New York without speaking any French and with an introduction from the Russian Consul in New York to the Russian Vice-Consul in Paris who in turn arranged an introduction to Russian photographer Sergei Lvovich Levitsky. Levitsky is quoted by Sachse as declaring Thompson's daguerreotypes were 'works of art'. Sachse further claims that Thompson influenced for the development of portrait daguerreotypes in Paris. From 1849-50 Thompson was listed as a photographer at 14 boulevard Poissonnière, rue Basse-du-Rempart in 1851, then 22 rue de Choiseul from 1853-59. Levitsky returned to Russia by 1849 but came back to Paris by 1859 where he took over Thompson's Choiseul address. This was also the premises for the French arts club.

Thompson (a.k.a. surname 'Warren-Thompson') produced daguerreotypes in Paris as well as very fine stereo daguerreotypes and a number of theatrical self-portraits some of very large size, but his body of known work is scant. The skill of his surviving work suggests he may have trained as a painter. For a pioneer era photographer whose role appears to have been quite prominent in Paris in the 1840s and 50s, Thompson's career is poorly known.
