= Henry Cundell =

Scottish painter, artist, and early photographer

- Born: 1810
- Died: 1886 (aged 75–76)
- Occupations: painter, artist, and early photographer

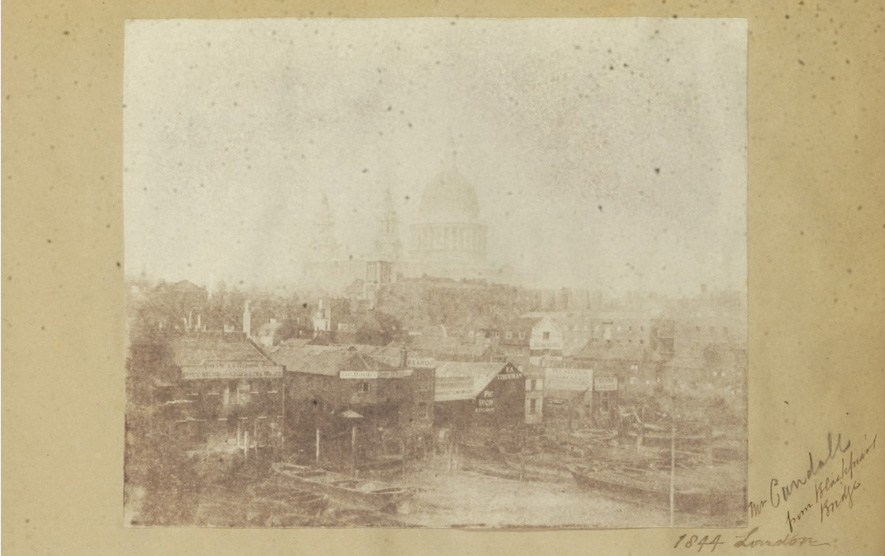
London in 1844

Henry Cundell (1810-1886) was a Scottish painter, artist, and early photographer. He exhibited for a short time in the 1850s.

== Biography ==
Trade card in the British Museum collection says

Henry Cundell, Chymist and Druggists... Makes and Sells all Sorts of Cymical and Galenical Medicines, with all Sorts of Drugs, Pyrmont and Spa Waters, &c. Physicians Perscriptions carefully Prepar'd, & Medicine-Chests fitted out in the neatest Manner, &c. likewise, Hamilton's Tincture for the Tooth-Ach [sic], and preserving the Teeth and Gums... Spirit of Pepper-Mint, Perfectly pure... Spirit of Penny-Royal & Mint...Pectoral Balsam of Honey... Chymical liquor for the Itch... [etc., etc.].

Henry Cundell's photographs are often attributed to either his brothers—George, Joseph, and Edward—or to his contemporary, Joseph Cundall. (Note: "Joseph Cundall was a publisher, author and photographer from Norwich who was involved in setting up the Photographic Club (sometimes known as the Calotype Club) in 1847.") Sara Stevenson and A. D. Morrison-Low wrote that Henry Cundell "figured in touring exhibitions set up by the London Society of Arts between 1852 and 1854. His photographs ranged from pictures taken in North Wales, to Perthshire, Durham, and Kensington."

His best-known photo of London in 1844 was wrongly attributed to Joseph Cundall. Julie L. Mellby of the Princeton University wrote about that calotype:

One day in 1844, twenty-six year old Joseph Cundall walked from his printing shop on Old Bond Street down to the Thames River carrying the box camera he recently designed and built, along with bottles of’ silver nitrate and gallic acid. Once settled on the Blackfriars Bridge, under a black cloth, he painted the chemistry onto some writing paper that had already been treated with silver nitrate and potassium iodide and then, inserted it into the camera. Focusing on St. Paul's Cathedral in the distance, Cundall opened the lens and made a single exposure. This calotype (paper negative) was used later to make several positive prints, one of which was given to his friend, optician Richard Willats, who pasted it into an album. That album and what might be the earliest photograph taken by Joseph Cundall is now at Princeton University.
