= Hugh Welch Diamond =

British photographer and psychiatrist (1809–1866)

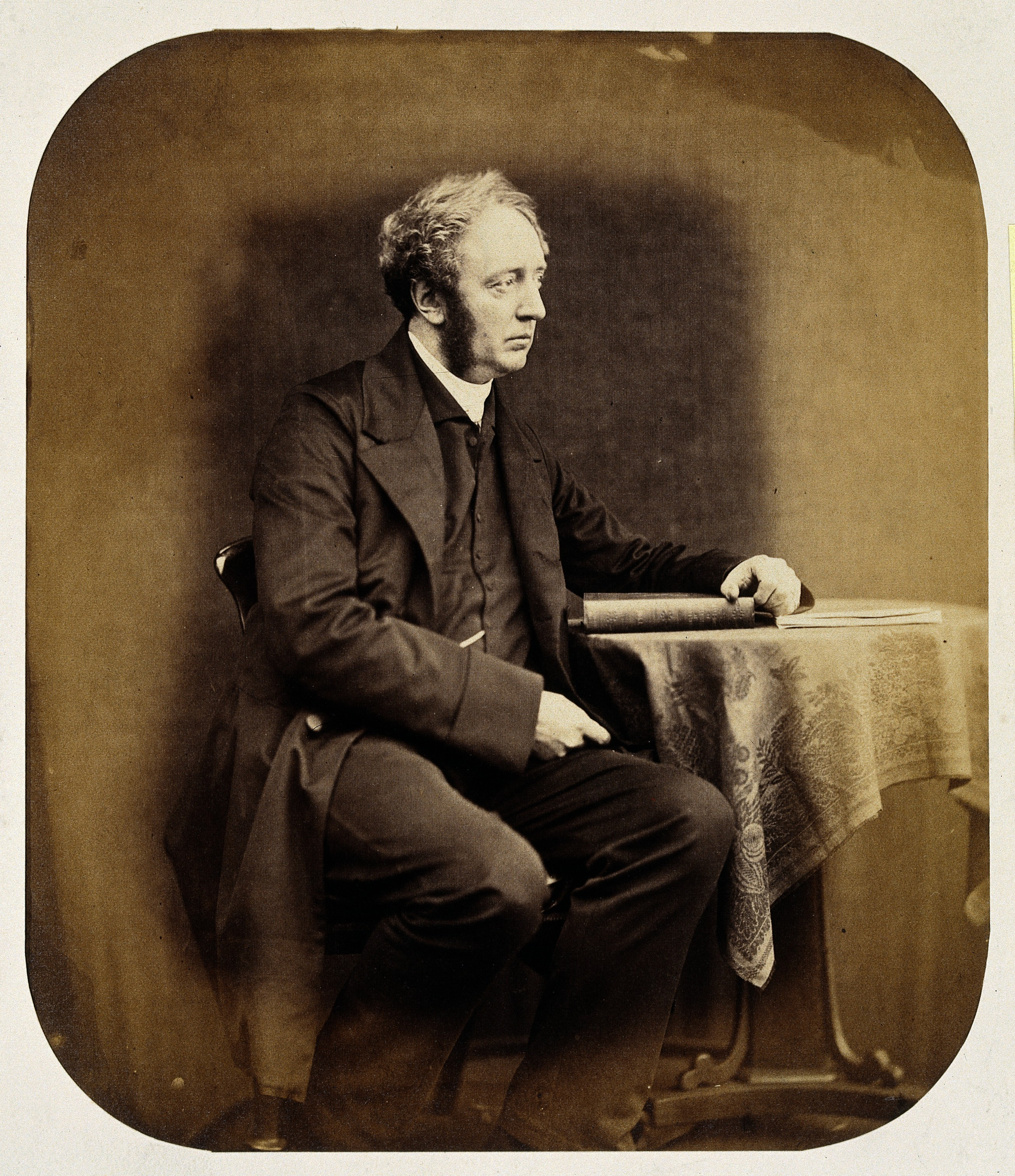
Portrait photograph of Hugh Welch Diamond, 1856.

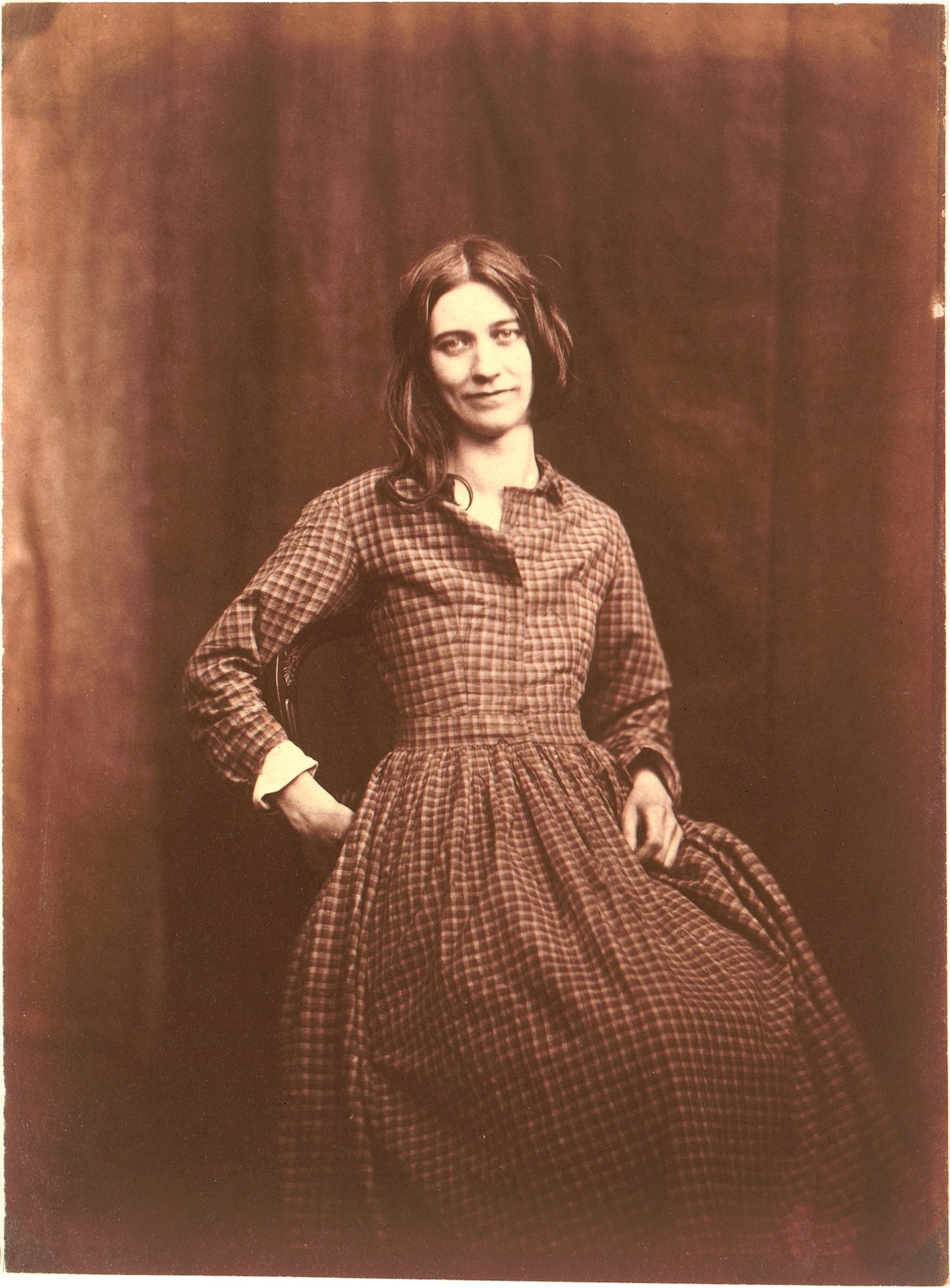
Photo of asylum patient, circa 1850–58

Hugh Welch Diamond (1809 – 21 June 1886) was an early British psychiatrist and photographer who made a major contribution to the craft of psychiatric photography.

== Early life ==
Diamond was educated at Norwich School and later studied medicine at the Royal College of Surgeons in 1824. He set up in private medical practice in Soho, London, and then decided to specialise in psychiatry, being appointed to Springfield asylum, the first Surrey County Asylum. Diamond later moved to Brookwood Hospital, also in Surrey. Diamond was one of the founders of the Photographic Society, was later its Secretary and also became the editor of the Photographic Journal. He was also a founder member of the Royal Aeronautical Society.

== Work ==
Diamond was fascinated by the possible use of photography in the treatment of mental disorders; some of his many calotypes depicting the expressions of people suffering from mental disorders are particularly moving. These were used not only for record purposes, but also, he claimed in the treatment of patients - although there was little evidence of success.

Perhaps it is for his attempts to popularize photography and to lessen its mystique that Diamond is best remembered. He wrote many articles and was a popular lecturer, and he also sought to encourage younger photographers. Among the latter was Henry Peach Robinson, who was later to refer to Diamond as a "father figure" of photography.

Recognition for his encouragement and for his willingness to share his knowledge came in 1855, in the form of a testimonial amounting to £300 for services to photography; among those who subscribed were such people as Delamotte, Fenton and George Shadbolt. In 1867, the Photographic Society awarded him its Medal in recognition of "his long and successful labours as one of the principal pioneers of the photographic art and of his continuing endeavours for its advancement." The following year, at his own initiative, he relinquished any further salary as Secretary of the Society, and became its Hon. Secretary.

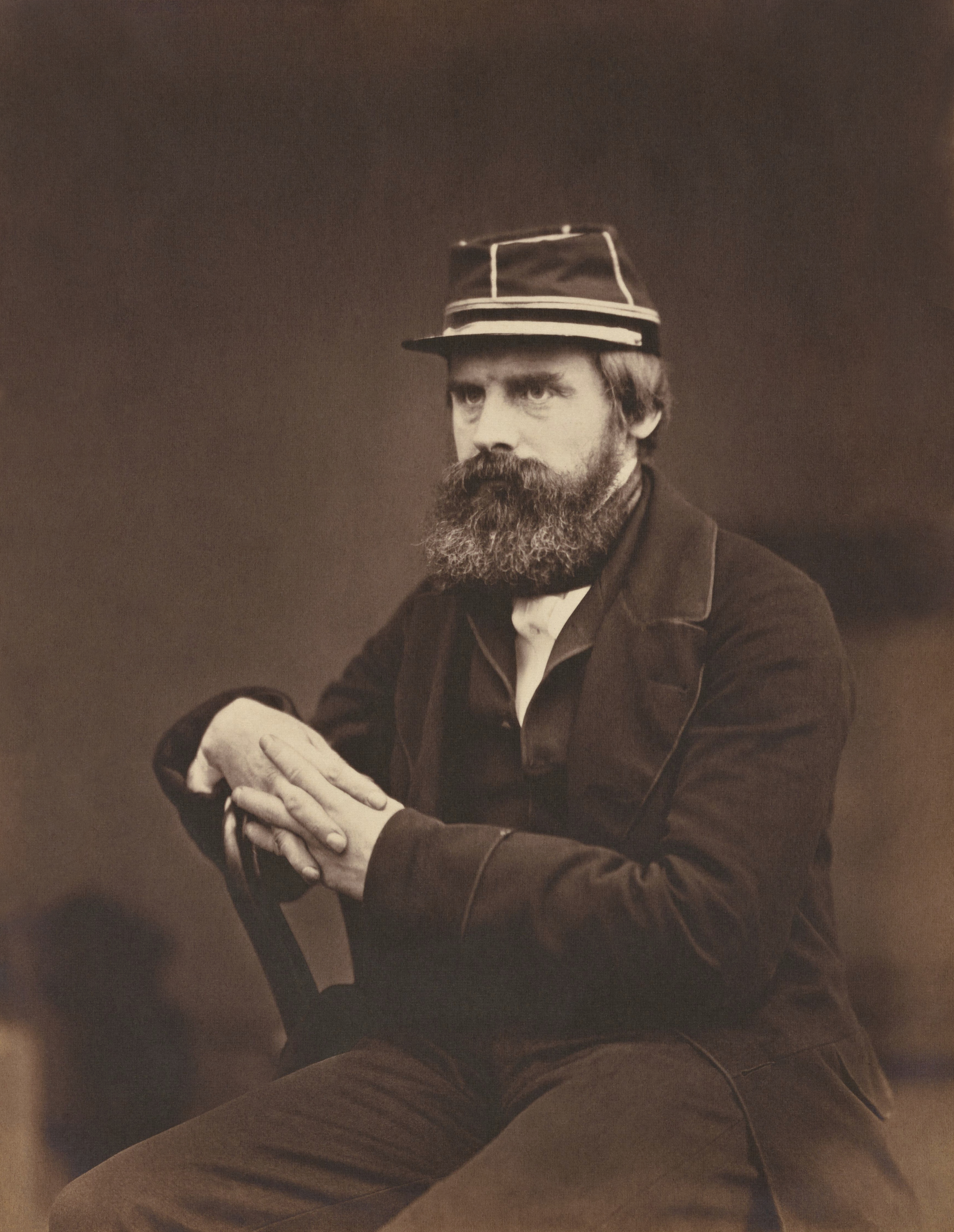
Photograph by Diamond of Roger Fenton
