= Claude-Marie Ferrier =

French photographer (1811–1889)

- Born: 1811; Lyon, France
- Died: 13 July 1889
- Occupation: Photographer

Claude-Marie Ferrier (1811–1889) was an early French photographer, known for his portraits of prominent French people, his work at the London Great Exhibition, and for his production of stereoviews to be viewed through the stereoscope invented by David Brewster.

== Biography ==
Ferrier was born in 1811 in Lyon, France. He began his career as an artist, studying at the École nationale supérieure des beaux-arts de Lyon. He then became interested in photography and began to experiment with the new medium, initially becoming known for his portraits of notable French people. By 1851 he had settled in Paris and in that year he exhibited at the Great Exhibition in London. His work so impressed the organisers that, together with the English photographer, Hugh Owen, he was asked to make photographs of the exhibits. More than 140 bound sets of reports and accompanying photographs, known as the Exhibition of the Works of Industry of All Nations, 1851: Reports by the Juries on the Subjects in the Thirty Classes into which the Exhibition was Divided were presented to, among others, Queen Victoria, Heads of Foreign Governments, the Exhibition commissioners, and the British Museum.

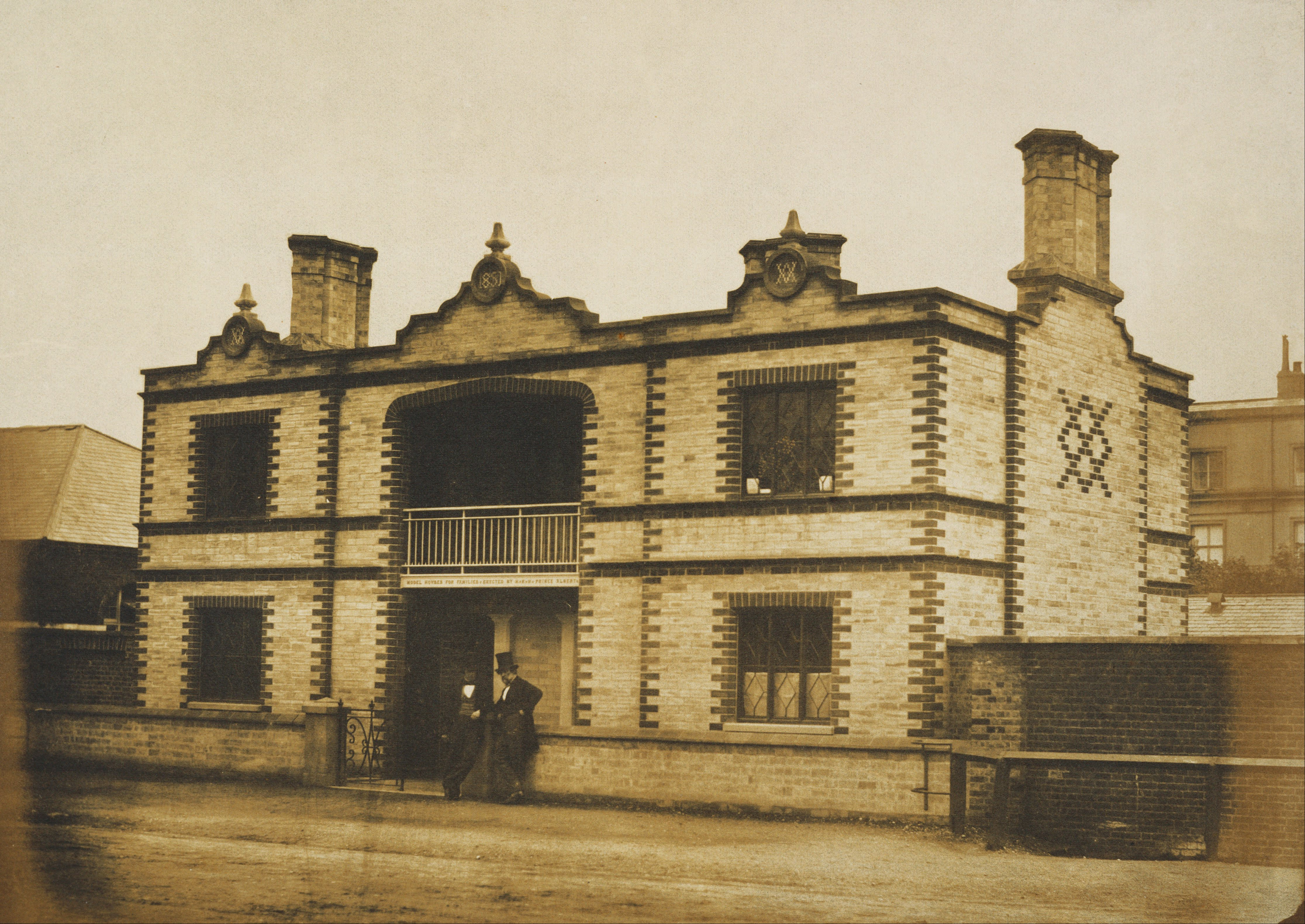
Photograph by Claude-Marie Ferrier of Prince Albert's Model Cottage, exhibited during the Great Exhibition

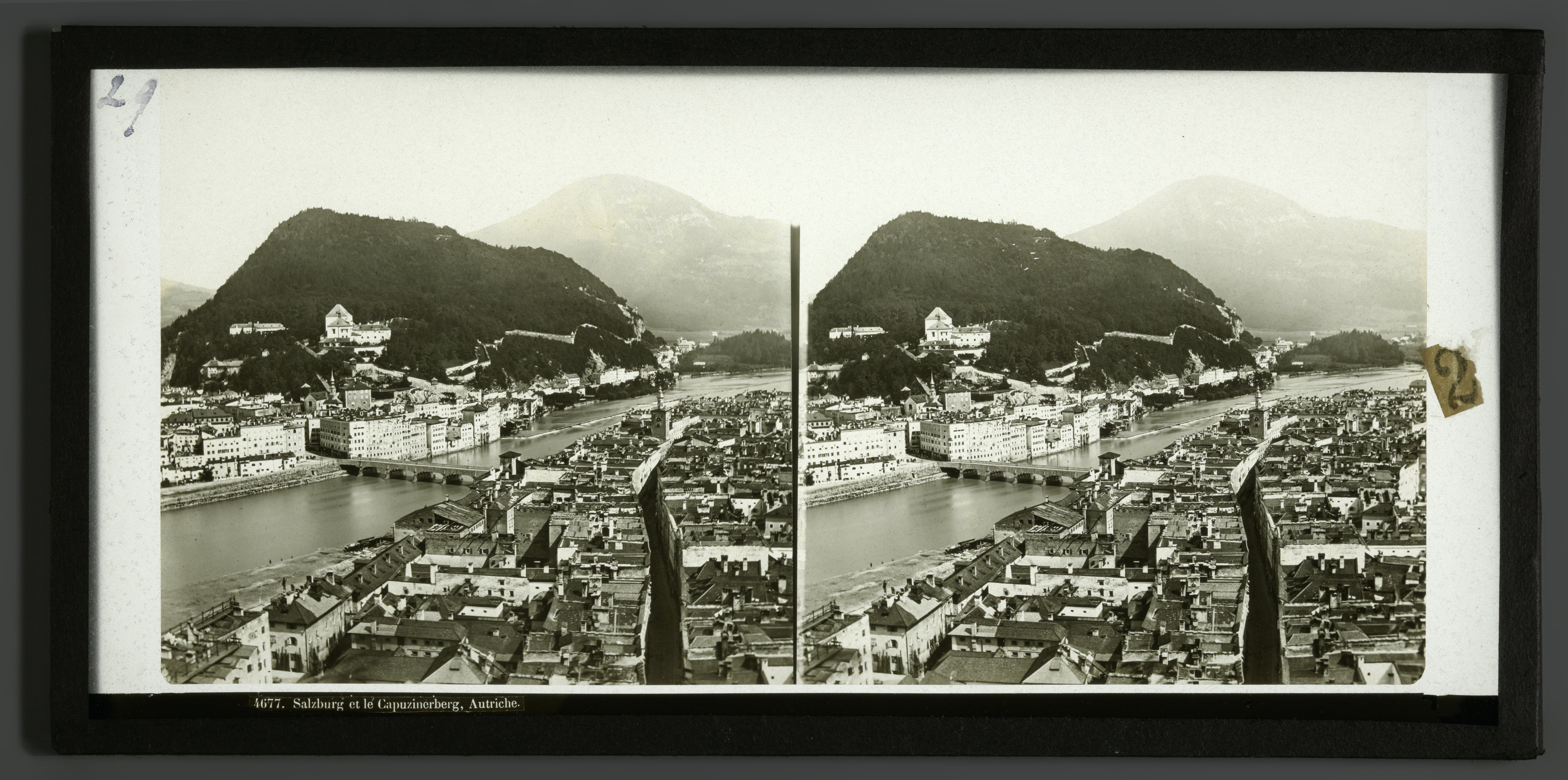
Stereoview of Salzburg by Ferrier and Soulier

In 1855, Ferrier exhibited at the Exposition Universelle of Paris, where he was awarded a silver medal. He is credited with creating the first glass stereoviews for the Brewster stereoscope in 1852. These became very popular and in 1857 he produced several series of stereoviews of France, Switzerland, Germany, Italy, Greece, and Turkey. Initially, he collaborated with Jules Duboscq, with the two selling each other's stereoviews. This arrangement came to an end when Duboscq experienced financial difficulties. In 1859 Ferrier went into partnership with his son and with another stereo photographer, Charles Soulier, with the business being sold in 1863 to Léon & Lévy, a company that specialized in stereoscopic views and picture postcards. However, Ferrier and Soulier continued to sell their photographs through the company.

Ferrier continued to work as a photographer until his death on 13 July 1889. His photographs are held in collections around the world.
