= Thomas Charles Wageman =

British painter

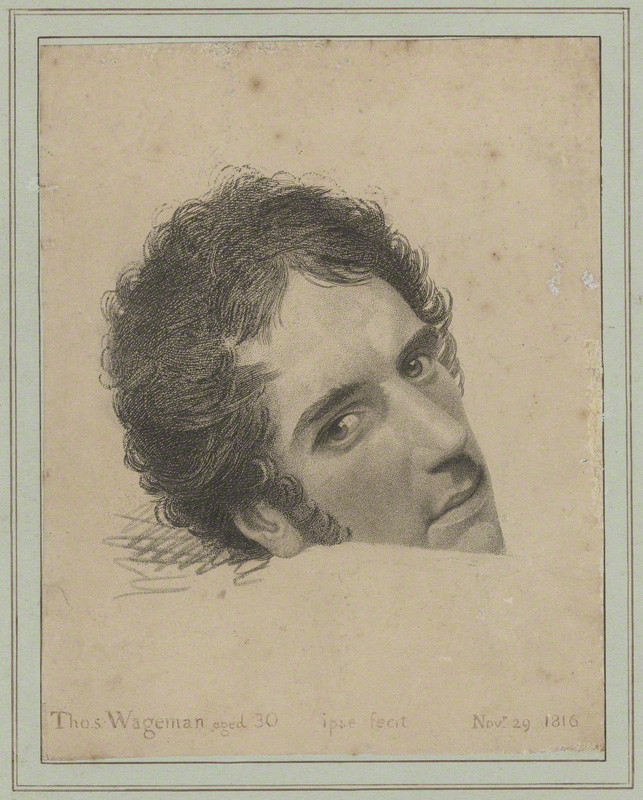
- Aged 30 (self portrait)
- Born: 1787
- Died: 20 June 1863

Thomas Charles Wageman (1787 – 20 June 1863) was a British painter, engraver and writer. He was known as a prolific portrait artist.

Wageman was a founder of the New Society of Painters in Water-Colours in 1831 together with William Cowen, James Fudge, Thomas Maisey, O. F. Phillips, J. Powell and W. B. S. Taylor.

== Works ==
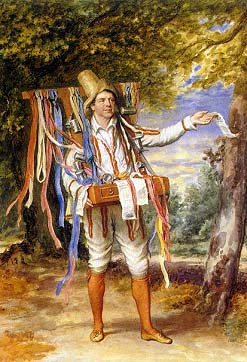
John Fawcett as Autolycus in "The Winter's Tale" (1828) by Wageman

Wageman painted many portraits that were turned into engravings, and was an engraver in his own right.

Some of his portraits and prints are held in the national collections of the United Kingdom. His 1828 Autolycus from The Winter’s Tale, is in the Victoria and Albert Museum. His portrait of Thomas Stothard is in the National Gallery. His portrait of the Irish actress Charlotte Mardyn is in the Royal Collection.

He illustrated Travels through Russia, Siberia, Poland, Cracow, Austria, Bohemia, Saxony, Prussia, Hanover ... undertaken during the years 1822, 1823, 1824, while suffering from total blindness, comprising an account of the author being conducted a state prisoner from the eastern parts of Siberia. by James Holman (London, Smith, Elder, and Co., 3rd ed 1834), among many other volumes

== Published works ==
- The military costume of Turkey : illustrated by a series of engravings, from drawings made on the spot. 1818, with John Heaviside Clark, pub T. M'Lean.
