= Henry John Sylvester Stannard =

English painter

Henry John Sylvester Stannard RBA FRSA
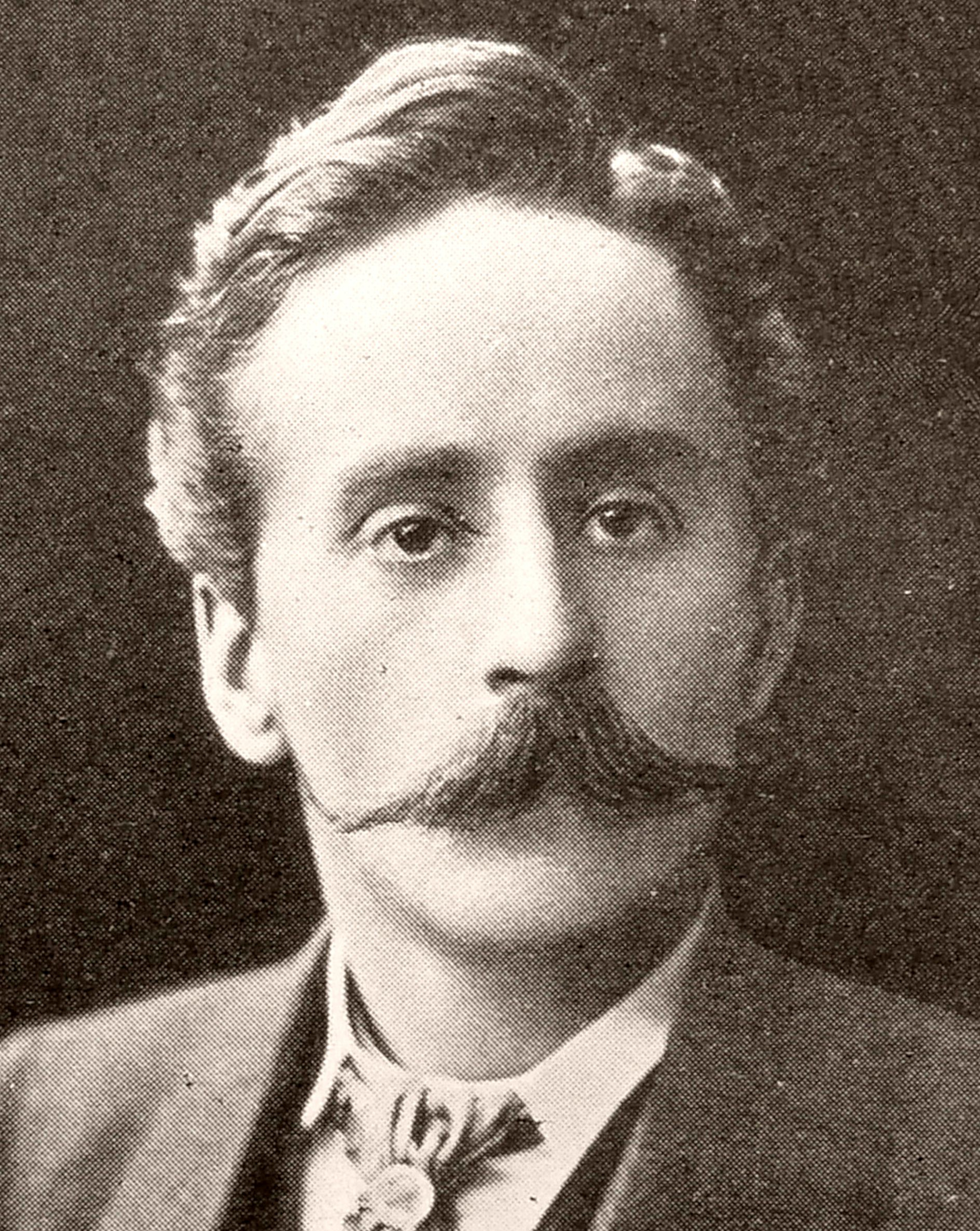
- Stannard, in 1907
- Born: 12 July 1870; London, England
- Died: 21 January 1951 (aged 80); Bedford, Bedfordshire, England
- Other names: Harry Stannard, H.Sylvester Stannard
- Known for: Watercolour artist
- Spouses: Minnie Callaway; Annie Clark; Violet Page; Wilhelmina Fordyce
- Children: Theresa Sylvester; William Henry Lawrence

Henry John Sylvester Stannard (12 July 1870 – 21 January 1951) was a British watercolour artist whose patrons included the British royal family.

== Life ==
Henry John Sylvester Stannard, also known as Harry Stannard and professionally as H. Sylvester Stannard, was born in London on 12 July 1870, the son of Henry Stannard, a sporting painter, and Ruth (née Willsher).

Stannard and his father descended from a family of well known Bedfordshire artists that included his sisters Lilian Stannard and Emily Stannard. He was educated at Bedford Modern School, and the National Art Training School in South Kensington. He was elected to the RBA in 1896 remaining a member until 1909.

In his work, Stannard typically depicted pastoral scenes and the rural idyll. He exhibited fifteen works at the Royal Academy (including “The Old Homestead”, “The Trees Began to Whisper” and “The Trysting Lane”), the Royal Institute of Painters in Water Colours, the New Gallery, the Royal Society of British Artists and the Royal Cambrian Academy of Art.

In 1906 Stannard was honoured by Queen Alexandra with a commission for a number of pictures including Her Majesty's Wild Garden and Woods at Sandringham. In 1922 he held an exhibition with his daughter at Brook Street Galleries in London where Queen Mary became a patron of his colour drawings. In 1934 he was commissioned by the Governors of Guernsey to paint a view of St Fermain's Bay and the harbour, a painting that was subsequently presented to the Prince of Wales. In 1936 he painted a view of the Prince of Siam's gardens at Virginia Water, and in 1937 two of his water colours of the River Dart were hung in the Royal Institute of Painters in Water Colours.

Stannard was married four times. In 1892 he married Minnie Callaway who died from complications in childbirth, secondly he married Annie Clark, a musician by whom he had a daughter Theresa Sylvester Stannard (1898-1947), also an artist. In 1917 he married Violet Page and after their divorce in 1933 he married for the fourth time, Wilhelmina Fordyce, with whom he had a son William Henry Lawrence Stannard (1934-2001), an occasional painter who exhibited with his father.

== Gallery ==
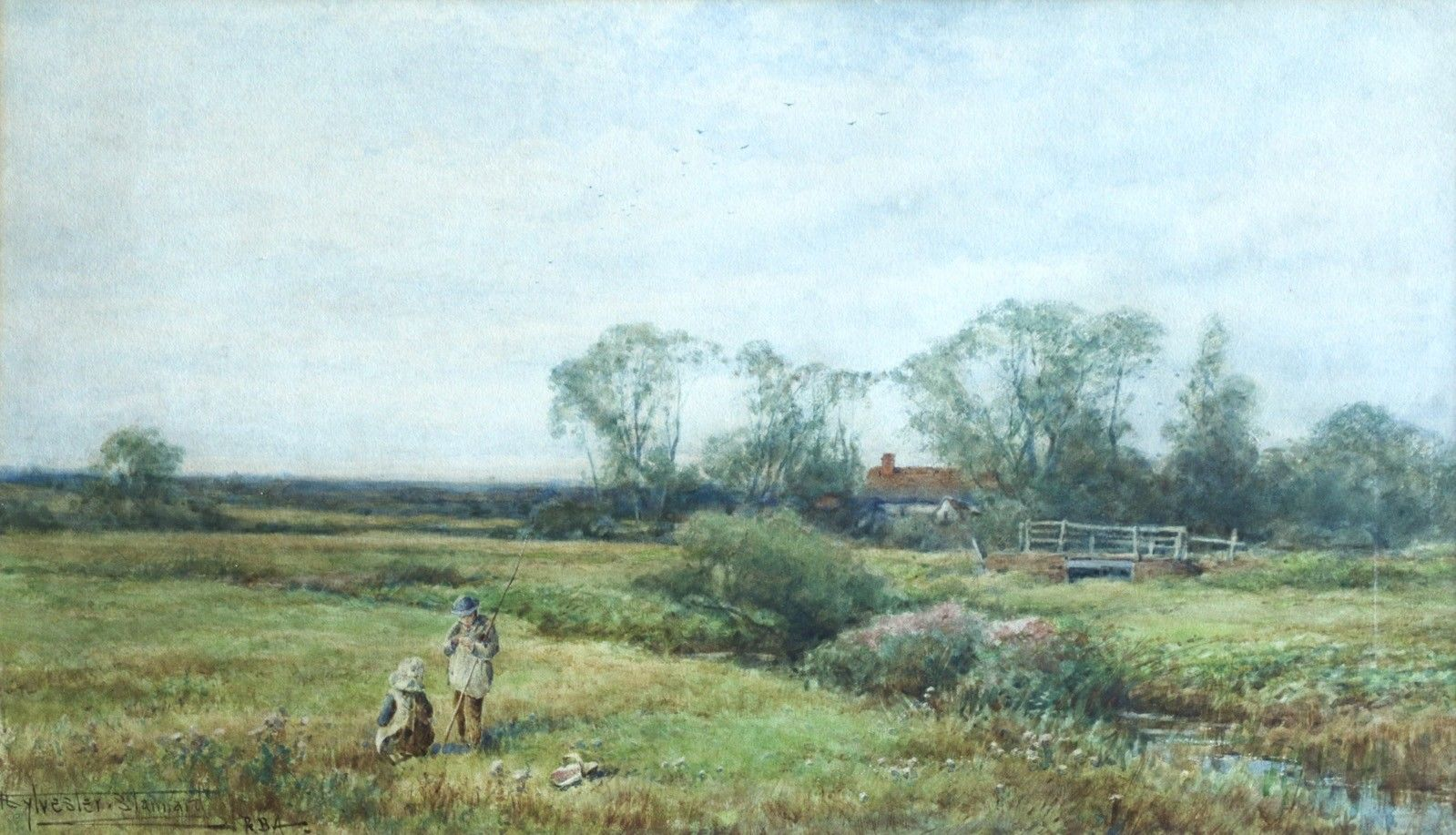
Happy moments at Wenhaston Mill, Suffolk

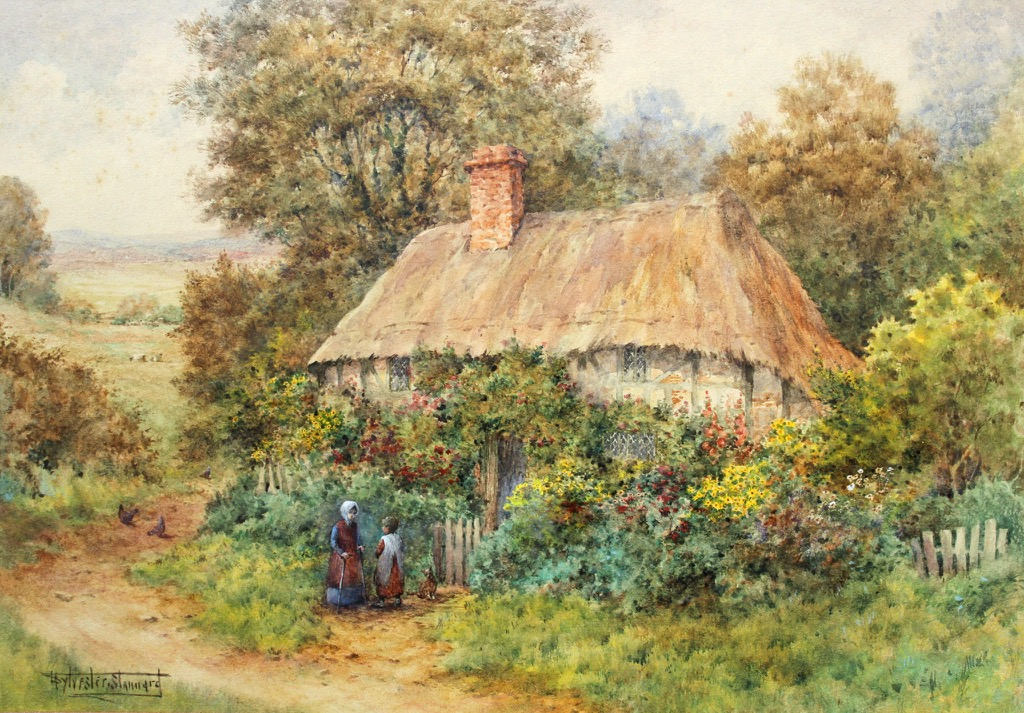
A typical rural scene with thatched cottage near Flitwick in spring

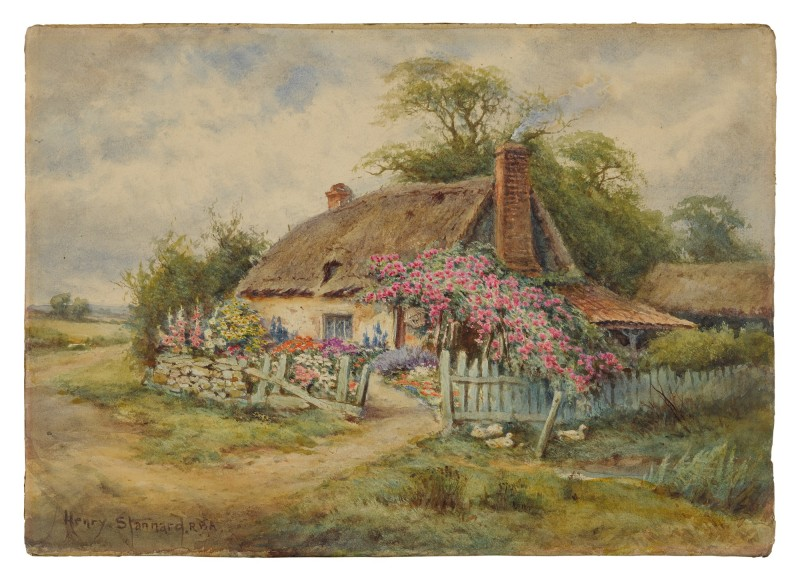
The Old Homestead

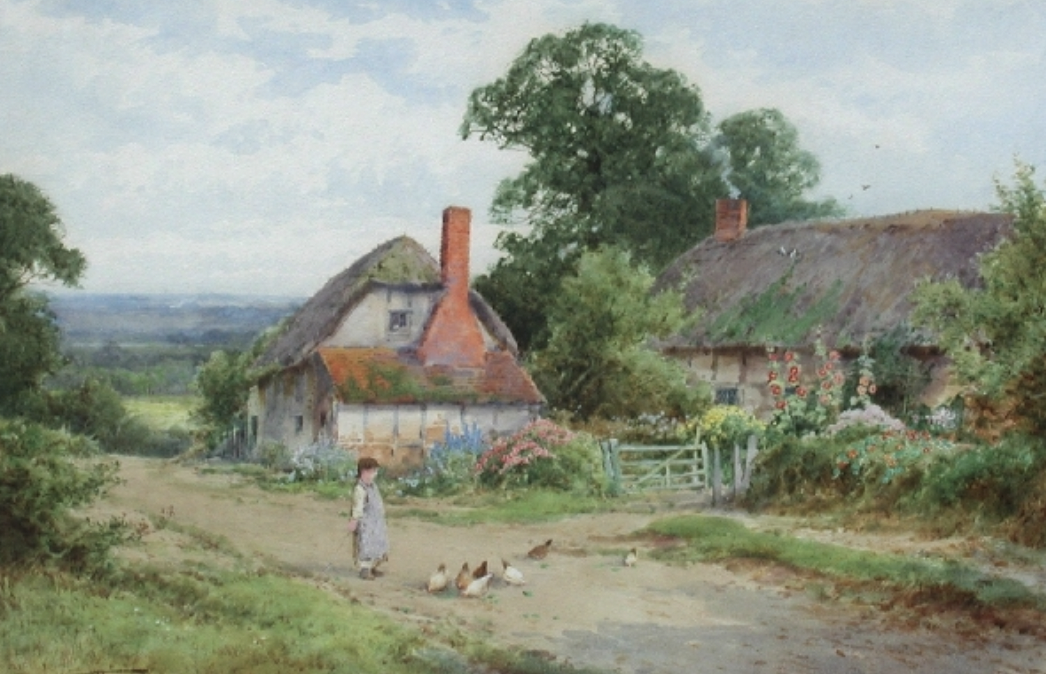
A Country Lane

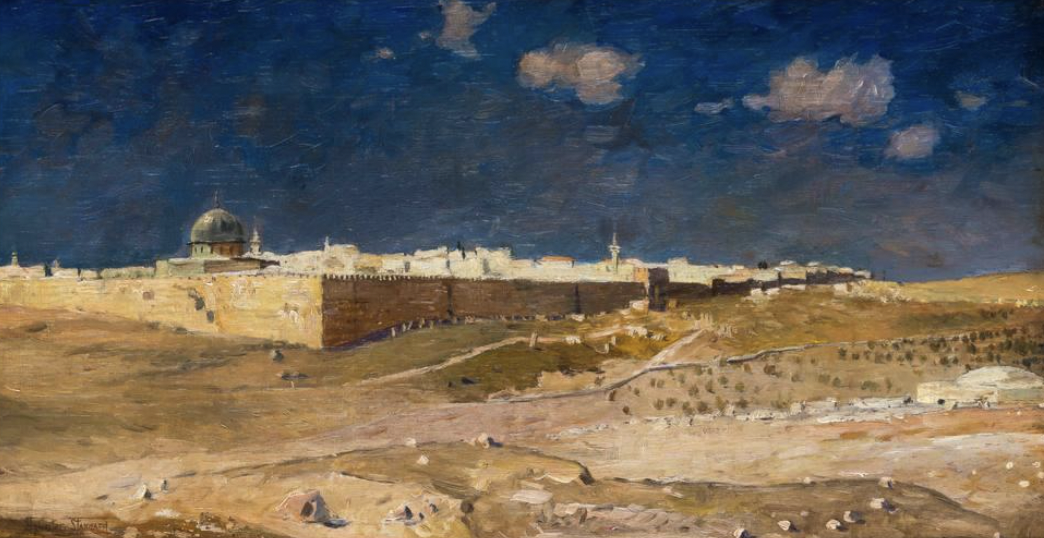
Panorama of Jerusalem

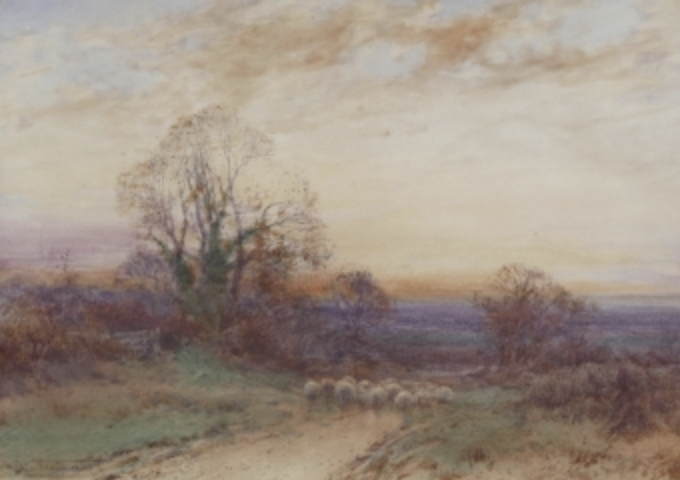
Sheep on a Country Lane at Dusk
