= Lilian Stannard =

English artist known for painting (1877–1944)

- Born: 24 March 1877; Froxfield, Bedfordshire, England
- Died: 24 November 1944 (aged 67); Blackheath, England
- Known for: Watercolours of gardens and flowers, butterflies, portrait miniatures.
- Notable work: An Old Watergarden (1904), Flowers of middle summer (1930), Summer Gardens of England (series of watercolours).
- Movement: garden painters
- Awards: Royal Institute of Painters in Watercolours, Royal Society of British Artists

Lilian Stannard RI (1877-1944) was an English illustrator and painter, primarily of watercolours. She was one of the select group of 'garden painters' that included George Samuel Elgood and Helen Allingham whose primary subject was the English garden. A prolific artist, whose work became widely known through reproductions, first showed at the Royal Society of British Artists in 1898 and exhibited twenty-eight watercolours of garden scenes at the Royal Academy of Arts between 1902 and 1930. She also exhibited at the Society of Women Artists, Royal Birmingham Society of Artists, Walker Art Gallery, Royal Cambrian Academy and held a large number of solo shows, especially at the galleries of Arthur Ackermann & Son and the Mendoza gallery in London. Illustrations of her work were used for a series of postcards and were included in Horace and Walter Wright's popular gardening volumes: The Perfect Garden (1908), Beautiful Flowers and How to Grow Them (1909) and Popular Garden Flowers (1911)

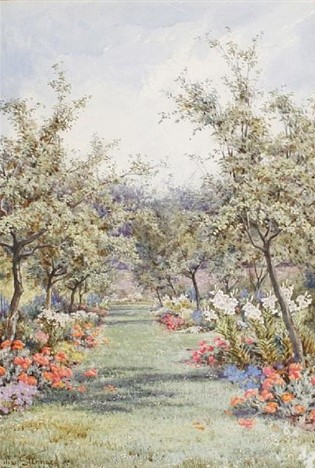
Lilian Stannard: A Garden at Queens College Cambridge

== Life and career ==
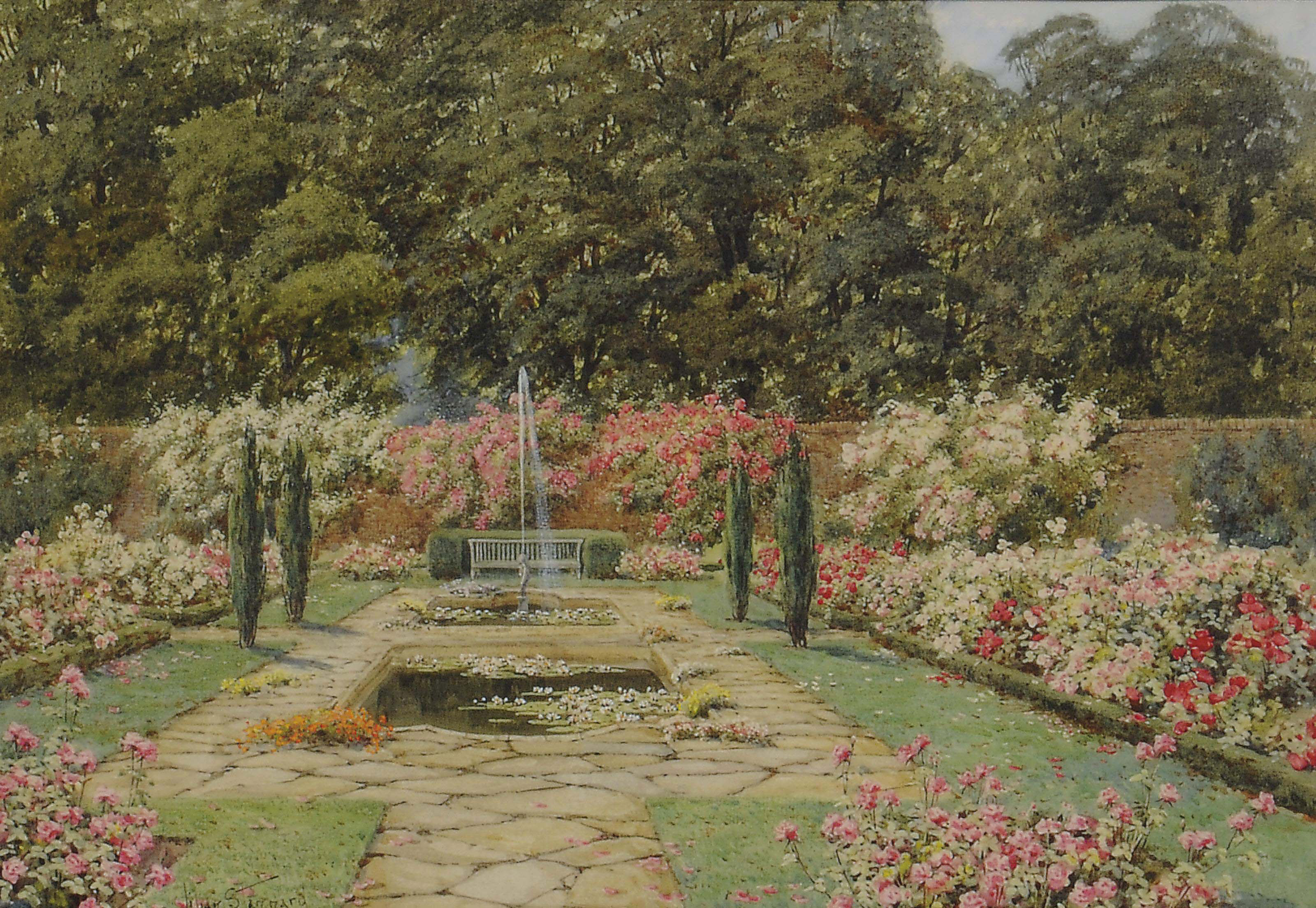
Lilian Stannard:The Walled Garden.

Lilian Stannard was born in Froxfield in Bedfordshire on 24 March 1877, the second daughter of Henry Stannard (1844-1920), a sporting painter and art teacher and his wife Ruth Willsher. She was one of five siblings, all of whom were taught to paint by their father. Her sister Emily Stannard (1875-1906) was a professional artist specialising in landscape scenes who also exhibited at the Royal Academy. Her brother Henry Sylvester Stannard (1870-1951) was also a successful landscape painter. Her other siblings Ivy Stannard (1881-1968) and Alexander Molyneux Stannard (1878-1975) were primarily skilled amateur artists, the later earning his living as an art tutor. as did his daughter Joan Molyneux Stannard (1903-1942) whose name occurs in the 1923 Women's Academy Exhibition at Kensington Olympia bur rarely afterwards. Lilian's niece Theresa Sylvester Stannard (1898-1947) was also a watercolourist who favoured landscapes and gardens. (Note: Some members of Lilian's immediate family believed there was a family connection to the Stannards of the Norwich School of painters, most of whom were active in the first part of the 19th-century. If there was then it was likely back several generations.) Lilian Stannard attended Howard College in Bedford, a private institution for girls established in 1852. with much of her artistic education at her father's studio, the Bedford Academy of Arts.

Her initial London showing in 1898 at the Royal Society of British Artists was atypical of her subsequent work being a watercolour study of a Small tortoiseshell and Cornflowers. She completed a series of detailed studies of butterflies at this time including Butterfly On Blackberry Bush shown at the Bedford Society of Artists which the Bedfordshire Times described thus ... of such minute fidelity as to bear scrutiny with a magnifier. This lady's exact drawing and colouring should be of great value to publishers and men of Science, but there is also poetry in the motion and the composition .... This was a perspicacious review as Stannard's colourful reproductions began to appear on postcards and to be included in popular gardening books such as those by Walter and Horace Wright. Lucrative commissions from owners of some of the finest gardens in England also materialised. In June 1906 a solo exhibition of fifty-two watercolours at the Mendoza Gallery entitled Summer Gardens of England was patronised by the Princess of Wales who bought, The Lover's Walk, Wavendon House. Many of England's grandest gardens and houses were represented: Woburn Abbey, Penshurst Place, Hampton Court, Levens Hall are all featured. The Observer newspaper review was fulsome in its praise ...I defy any lover of an old-fashioned English garden to see these drawings without real delight. There is a peace, a repose, almost a fragrance about each and all of them ... The Times critic was less effusive but described Stannard as ... a serious rival of other artists who have devoted themselves to gardens ... A major commission came from Lady Anastasia Wernher (1892-1977), for whom she painted a series of views of the gardens at Luton Hoo in Bedfordshire. A further exhibition of thirty watercolours entitled Flower Gardens of England at the Mendoza Gallery in 1907 was similarly well received.

In 1911 she married Dr. Walter Silas (1874 - 1959), thereafter moving from Bedfordshire to London where her two daughters Elizabeth and Kathleen were born. In 1914 and again in 1923 she held a joint exhibition of her work with Charles E. Brittan Jr (1870 - 1949). At the earlier exhibition An old garden gateway in Surrey sold to Queen Alexandra. Stannard held a series of solo exhibitions in the 1920s and 30s at venues that included Arthur Ackermann's New Bond Street gallery and Cambridge University. Stannard was well established by the end of World War I and her style of painting changed little in the inter-war years. Her vibrant use of colours and the nostalgia that was evoked by her depictions of grand and cottage gardens remained popular with the public but largely ignored by art critics and historians.

Following the end of the Great War, she lived for a decade in Bedford and then returned to London, dying in Blackheath on 24 November 1944.

== Solo Exhibitions (selected) ==
- 1906 Summer Gardens of England - Mendoza Gallery, London (52 paintings)
- 1907 Flower Gardens of England - Mendoza Gallery, London (30 paintings)
- 1914 Flower Gardens (shared with C.E. Brittan), Arthur Ackermann & Son Ltd., London (c.30 paintings)
- 1923 Flower Gardens of England (shared with C.E. Brittan), Arthur Ackermann & Son Ltd., London (32 paintings)
- 1932 Flower Gardens of England (shared with C.E. Brittan), Henry Graves & Co, London (14 paintings)

Details of Exhibitions from Lester, AJ (1984), The Stannards of Bedfordshire: A Family of Watercolour Painters Patronised by Royalty. Eastbourne Fine Arts

== Bibliography ==
- Summer gardens of England : water-colour drawings of Miss Lilian Stannard. Catalogue of an exhibition held at and published by Mendoza Gallery, London, 1906.
- Dictionary of Women Artists. An international dictionary of women artists born before 1900. By Chris Petteys. Boston: G.K. Hall & Co., 1985.
- Clayton-Payne, Andrew, Stannard Lilian et al. (illustrations), (1988 revised) Victorian Flower Gardens' George Weidenfeld and Nicolson, London, 1988. ISBN 0297830171
- Lester, Anthony J (1984), The Stannards of Bedfordshire: A Family of Watercolour Painters Patronised by Royalty. Eastbourne Fine Arts.ISBN 0902010115
- Walpole, Josephine (2006), A History and Dictionary of British Flower Painters 1650-1950 published by The Antique Collectors' Club.ISBN 1851495045
- Wood, Christopher (1978), The Dictionary of Victorian Painters Second edition. Woodbridge, England: Antique Collectors' Club.

== Gallery (selected) ==
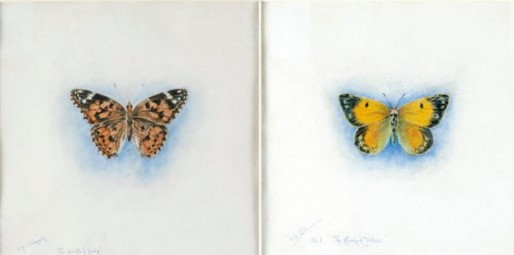

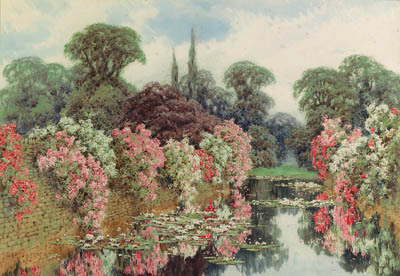

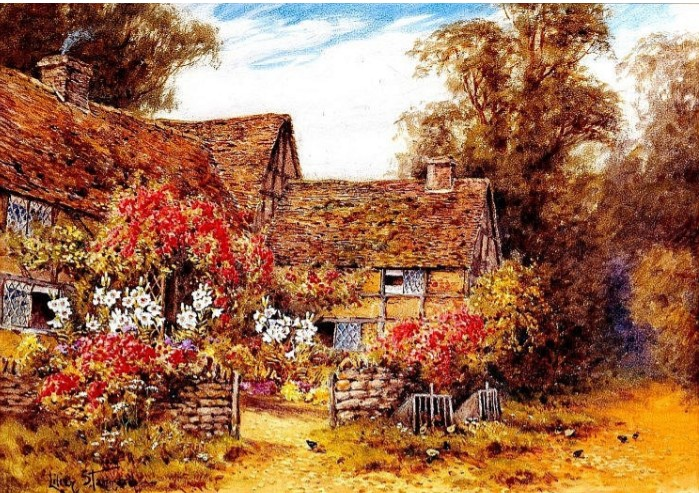

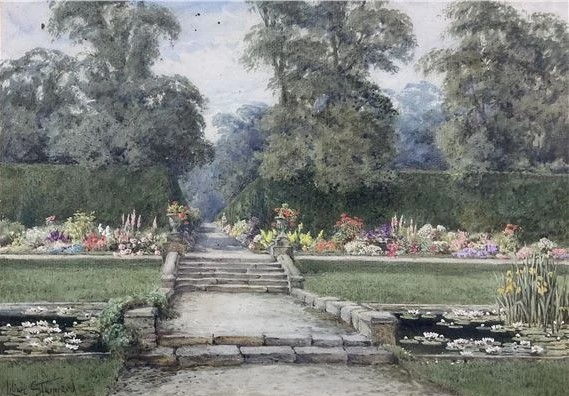

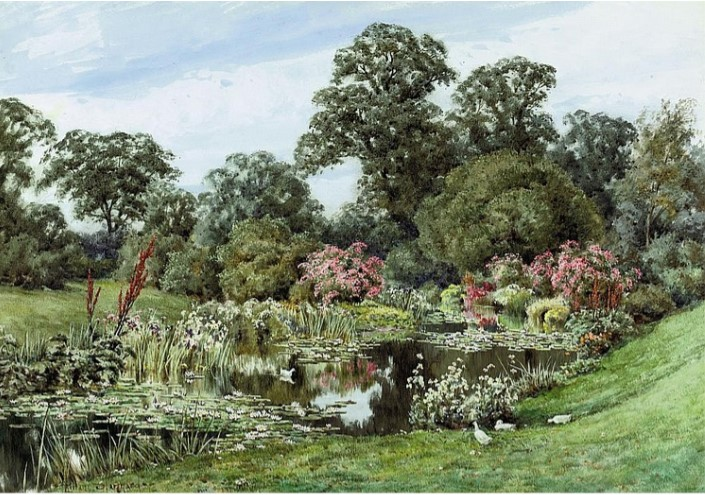

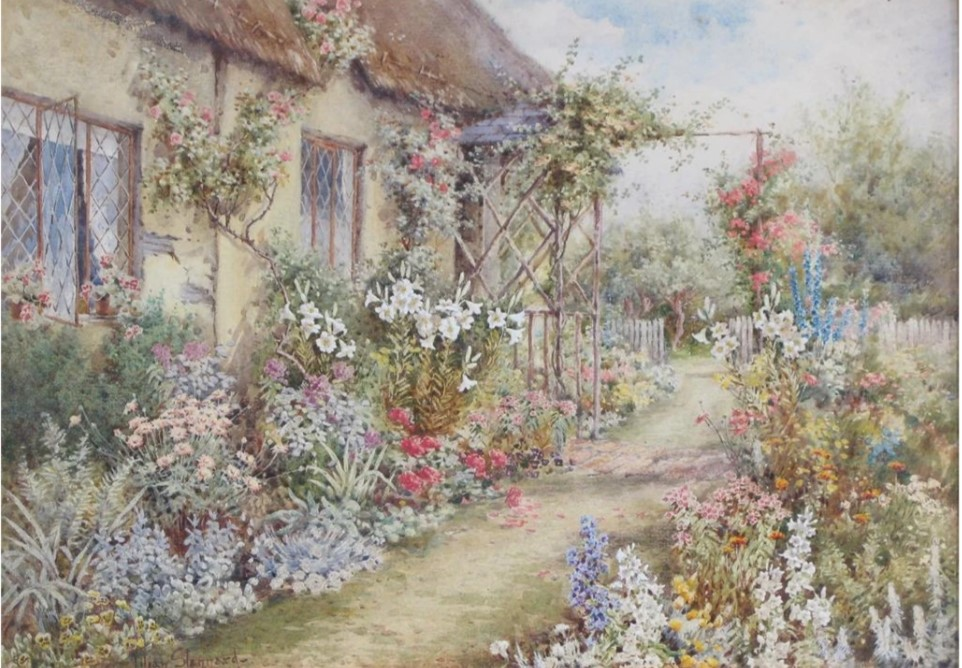

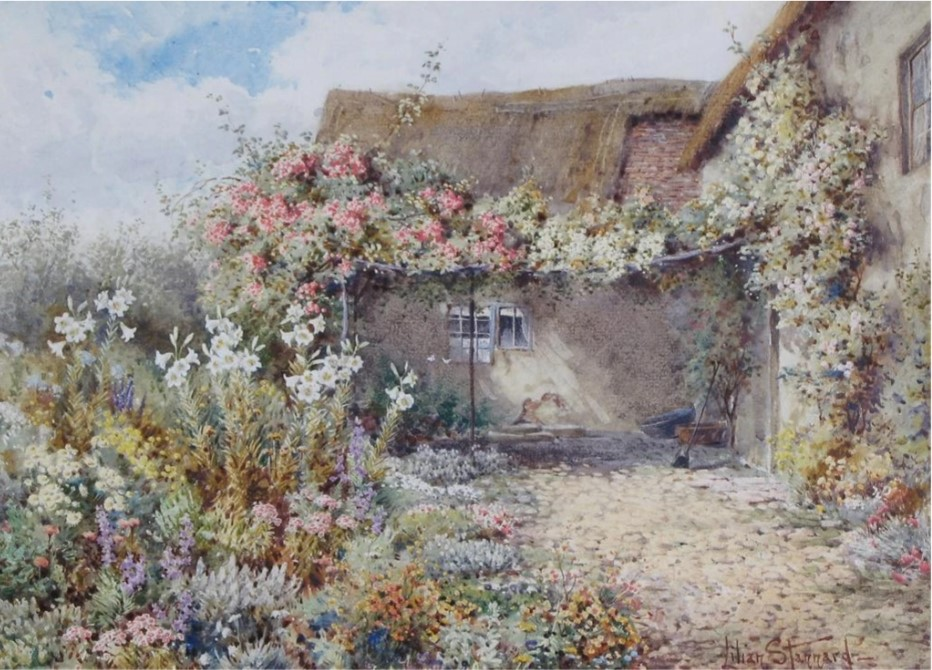

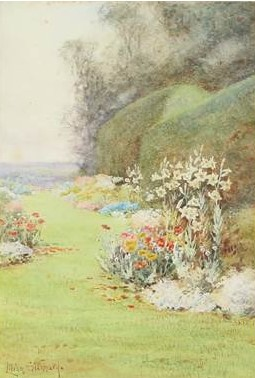

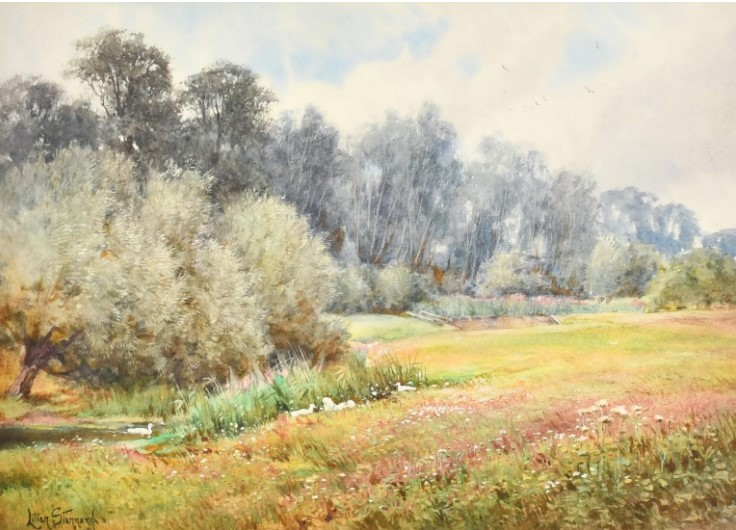

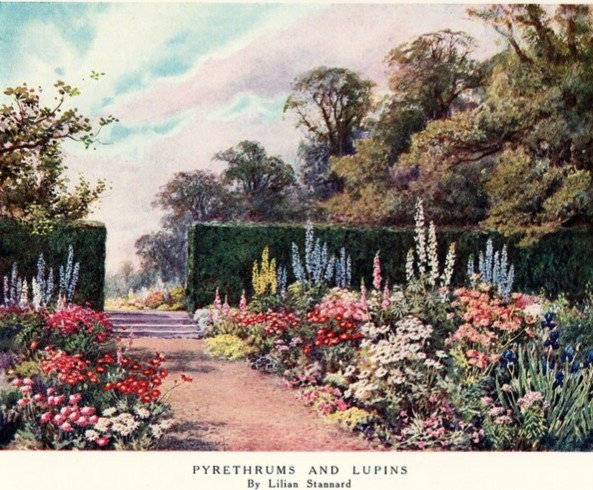

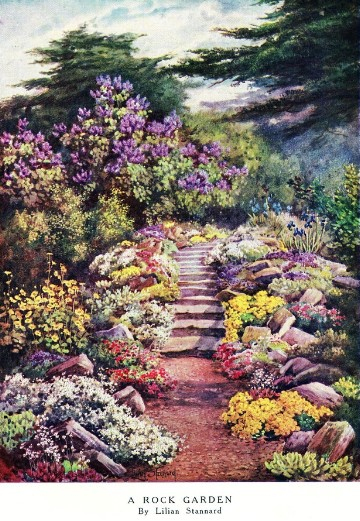

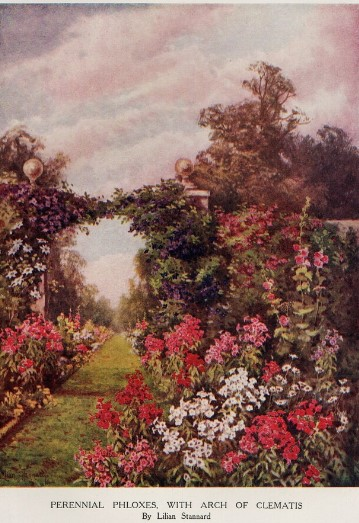
