= Emily Farmer =

English painter

Emily Farmer (25 July 1826, London - 8 May 1905, Portchester, Hampshire) was an English watercolour painter.

== Life ==
She was one of three children of John Biker Farmer, who worked for the East India Company, and his wife Frances Ann (née Frost). She was home-educated and instructed in art by her brother Alexander Farmer, a genre painter.

== Art ==
Farmer initially painted miniatures, exhibiting two at the Royal Academy in 1847 and 1849, but from 1850 specialised in genre paintings, many of children in rustic surroundings. Kitty's Breakfast (1883), a picture of a girl in a cottage kitchen pouring a saucer of milk for a kitten, is typical of her style. This, along with In doubt (1881), is held at the Victoria and Albert Museum.

Other well-known works include Deceiving Granny (1860), The Primrose Seller (1867), The ABC Class (1863), The Undecided Purchaser (1864), and The Listener (1872).

In 1854 she was elected a member of the New Society of Painters in Water Colours to whose exhibitions she sent ninety-six paintings over a fifty-year period. She also showed works at the Liverpool Academy and the Royal Scottish Society of Painters in Watercolour.

Over this period she lived at Portchester House, Hospital Lane, Portchester, Hampshire, where she died in 1905; she is buried nearby in St Mary's Churchyard within Portchester Castle.A commemorational plaque is situated beside her former residence.
