= Edmund George Warren =

English painter

Edmund George Warren (1834–1909) was a British landscapist who worked in both watercolours and oils.

Warren lived first in London, then later in Chudleigh Devon, South-West England. He was acknowledged as the first landscape artist to be influenced by the pre-Raphaelites ideas of colour, meticulous observation of the subject, and attention to detail. He was also influenced by the English artist Richard Redgrave. Working in both oils and watercolours, his work became very popular during the late 1850s to early 1860s, though critical reception was mixed with, for example, art critic John Ruskin denying that Warren was a true pre-Raphaelite because his landscapes owed more to "cleverly deceptive technique" than observation.

Warren became a member of the New Society of Painters in Watercolours (RI), an organisation set up to challenge the members-only exhibition rules of the old "Society of Painters in Water Colours"; He went on to exhibit nearly 200 paintings with the society including his large-scale work, Rest in the Cool and Shady Wood, which became the star attraction at the 1861 exhibition. He also belonged to the Royal Institute of Oil Painters (ROI).

Warren's paintings were characterised by evocative and Idyllic depictions of the English countryside, woodlands and harvesting scenes.
