= Thistlethwaite =

Thistlethwaite (literally "thistle thwaite") may refer to:

== People ==
- Anthony Thistlethwaite (born 1955), British multi-instrumentalist, member of the folk-rock group The Waterboys
- Frank Thistlethwaite (1915–2003), English academic
- Glenn Thistlethwaite (1885–1956), American football head coach
- John R. Thistlethwaite (1918–1996), American journalist
- Matt Thistlethwaite (born 1972), Australian politician
- Morwen Thistlethwaite, knot theorist and professor of mathematics for the University of Tennessee in Knoxville
- Susan Brooks Thistlethwaite (born 1948), American theologian, author, activist

== Other uses ==
- Dowker–Thistlethwaite notation, mathematical knot theory

== See also ==
- Thistlethwayte
