= Edward Wesson =

English painter

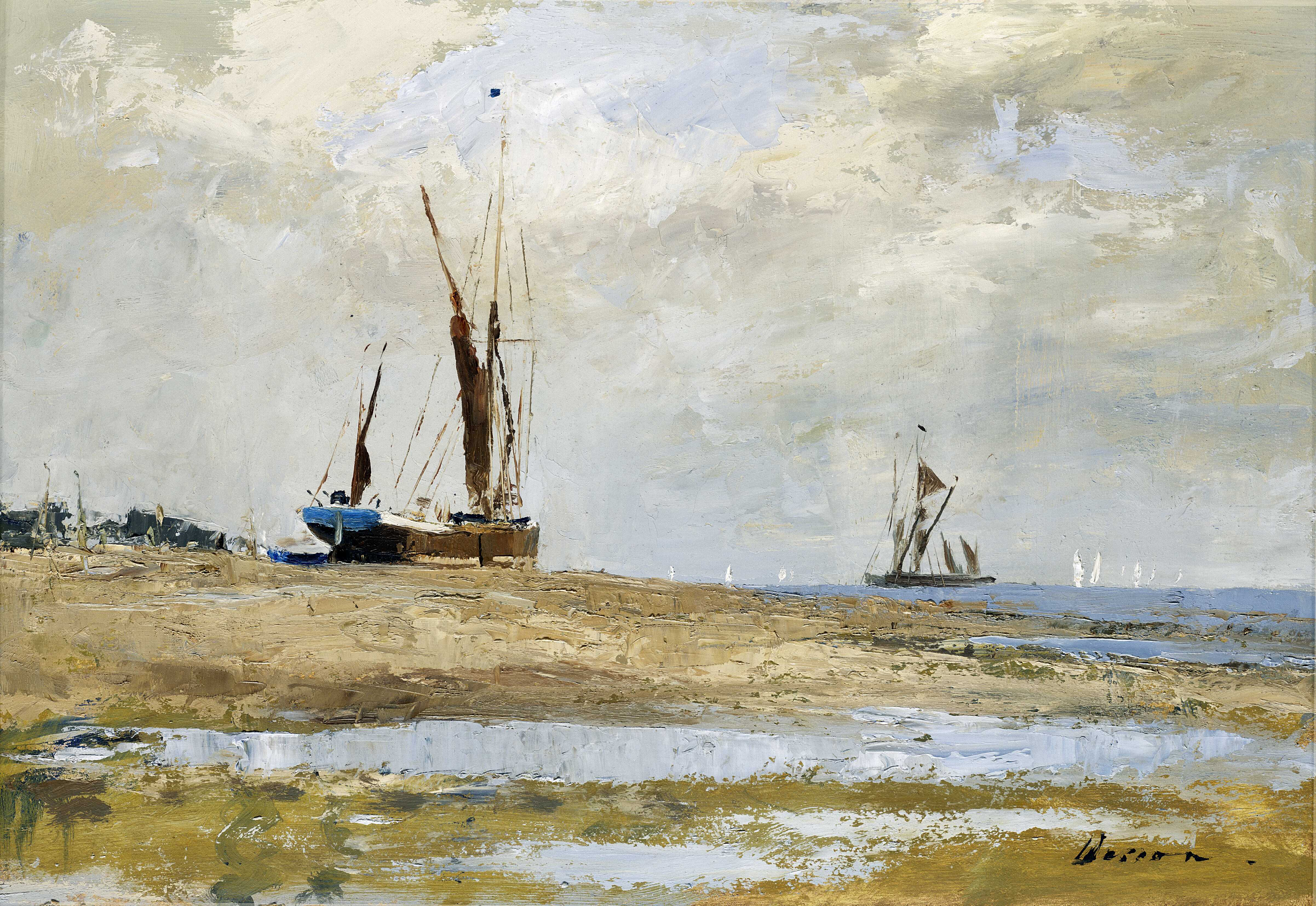
"High and Dry" by Wesson in Royal Museums Greenwich

Edward Wesson RI RSMA (29 April 1910 – 1983) was an English watercolour artist.

== Early life ==
Wesson was born in Blackheath in south east London.

== Work ==
His work is known for its simplicity, boldness and mastery of brushwork. He is remembered by many painters as a very encouraging teacher.

== Personal life ==
He had one daughter, Elizabeth Wesson.

== Bibliography ==
- Ron Ranson: The Art of Edward Wesson, 1993. ISBN 0-7153-0013-X
- Steve Hall & Barry Miles: The Watercolours of Edward Wesson, 2004. ISBN 1-84114-362-6
- Barry Miles: Edward Wesson 1910 - 1983, 1999. ISBN 1-84114-032-5
