= Portchester Castle =

Medieval castle on Roman site in Hampshire, England

- Portchester, Hampshire
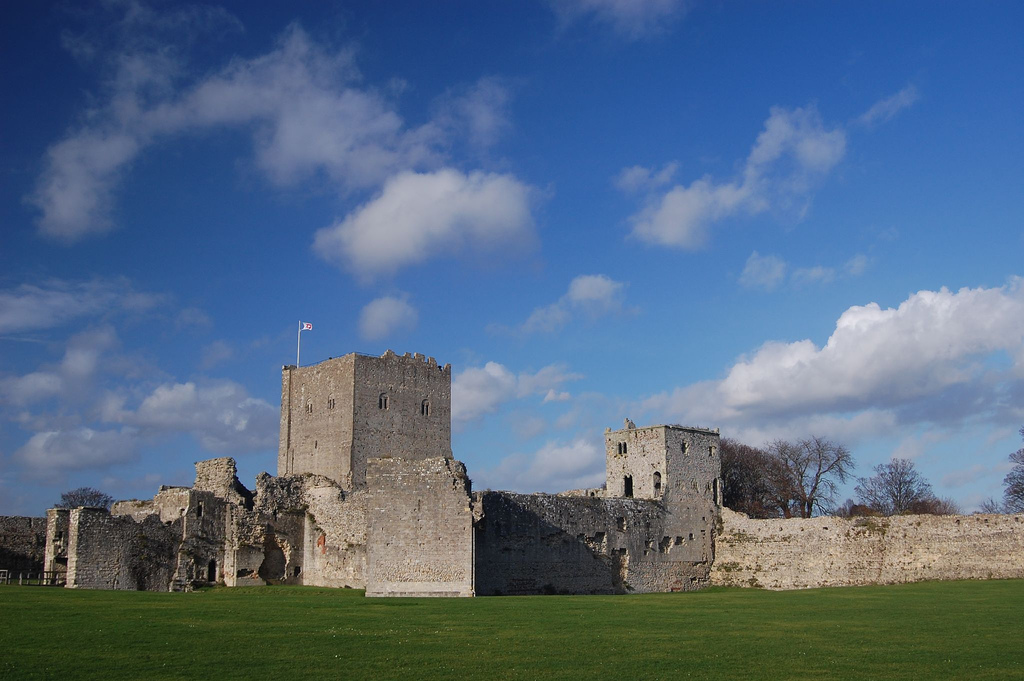
- The inner bailey

Location
- Location within Hampshire
- Coordinates: 50°50′12″N 1°06′47″W grid reference SU624045

Scheduled monument
- Official name: Portchester Castle
- Designated: 13 January 1915
- Reference no.: 1015698

Listed Building – Grade I
- Official name: Portchester Castle
- Designated: 18 October 1955
- Reference no.: 1229190

Portchester Castle is a medieval fortress that was developed within the walls of the Roman Saxon Shore fort of Portus Adurni at Portchester, to the east of Fareham in Hampshire.

The keep was probably built in the late 11th century as a baronial castle, before Portchester came under royal control in 1154. The monarchy controlled the castle for several centuries; it was a favoured hunting lodge of King John, and was besieged and captured by the French in 1216 before permanently returning to the English shortly thereafter.

With a commanding position at the head of Portsmouth Harbour, Portchester was an important port in the medieval period. The castle saw the embarkation for several campaigns to France led by England's kings. In anticipation of a French invasion during the first quarter of the 14th century, Edward II spent £1,100 repairing and reinforcing Portchester Castle. A plot to overthrow Henry V was discovered and the culprits apprehended at Portchester; this event features in Shakespeare's play Henry V. Later in its history, the castle was used as a prison.

Today Portchester Castle is a Scheduled monument, and a Grade I listed building. The castle has been in the ownership of the Southwick Estate since the 17th century but is managed by English Heritage and open to visitors throughout the year. The Norman church, St. Mary's, which stands in the south-east corner of the grounds, falls within the Anglican Diocese of Portsmouth.

== Background ==
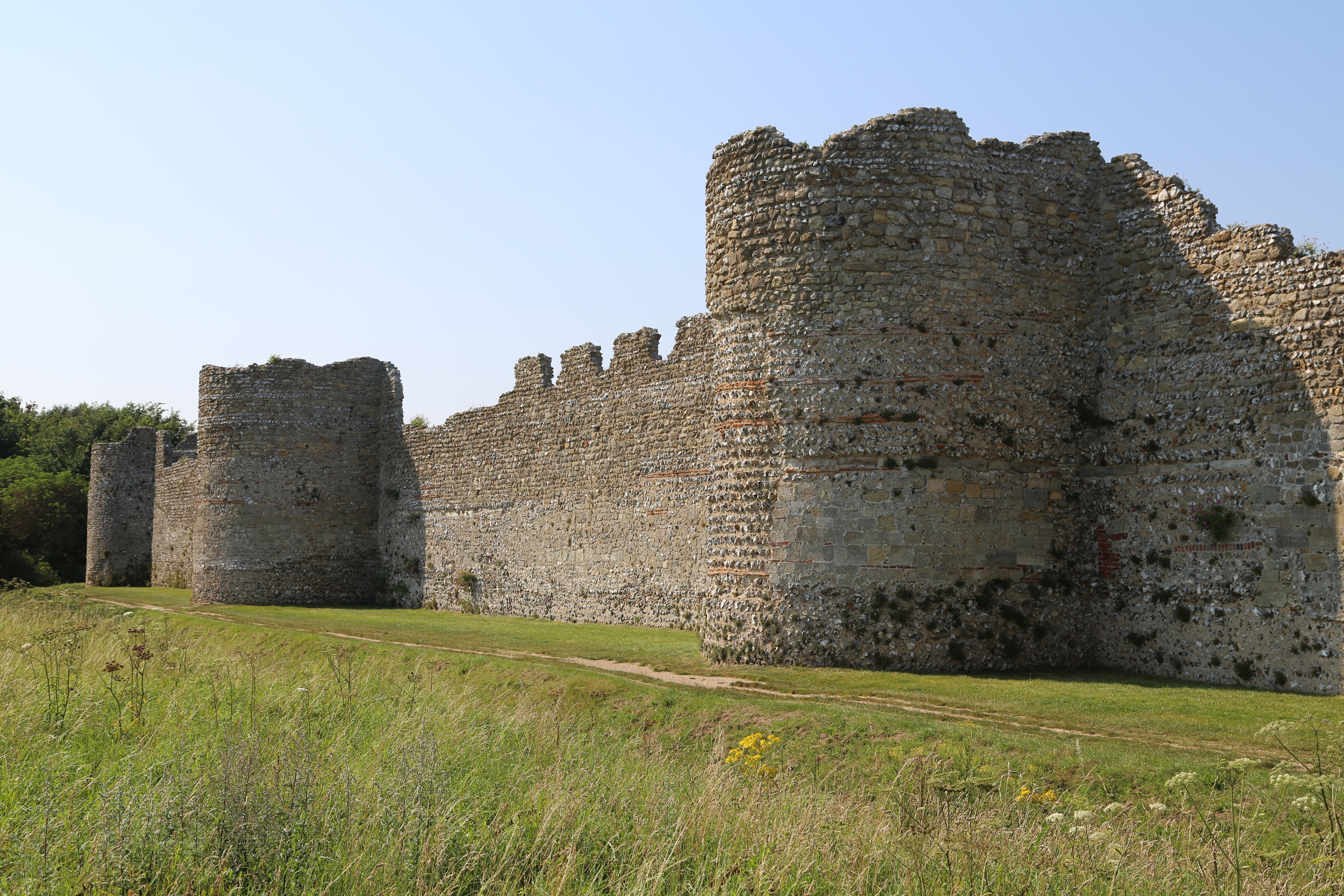
The D-shaped towers are typical of 3rd-century Roman forts, containing horizontal layers of distinctive Roman red-brick tiles. These Roman defences were integrated into the medieval castle.

The strategic importance of Portchester has been recognised since at least the 3rd century when a Roman fort was established on the site. Though it is uncertain exactly when the fort was constructed, it is thought that it was built by Marcus Aurelius Carausius on the instructions of emperor Diocletian between 285 and 290. It was one of several forts built along the British coast in the period to combat raids by pirates. Portchester was probably a base from which the Classis Britannica, the Roman fleet defending Britain, operated. It is the best preserved Roman fort north of the Alps.

Although the Roman army retreated from Britain in the early 5th century, it is unlikely that the fort was ever completely abandoned, although its use continued on a much smaller scale. A 10th-century hall and tower were discovered within the fort, suggesting it was a high-status residence during the Saxon period. In 904, Portchester came into the possession of King Edward the Elder and the fort became a burh to help defend the country against Vikings, as listed in the Burghal Hidage.

== Medieval castle and palace ==
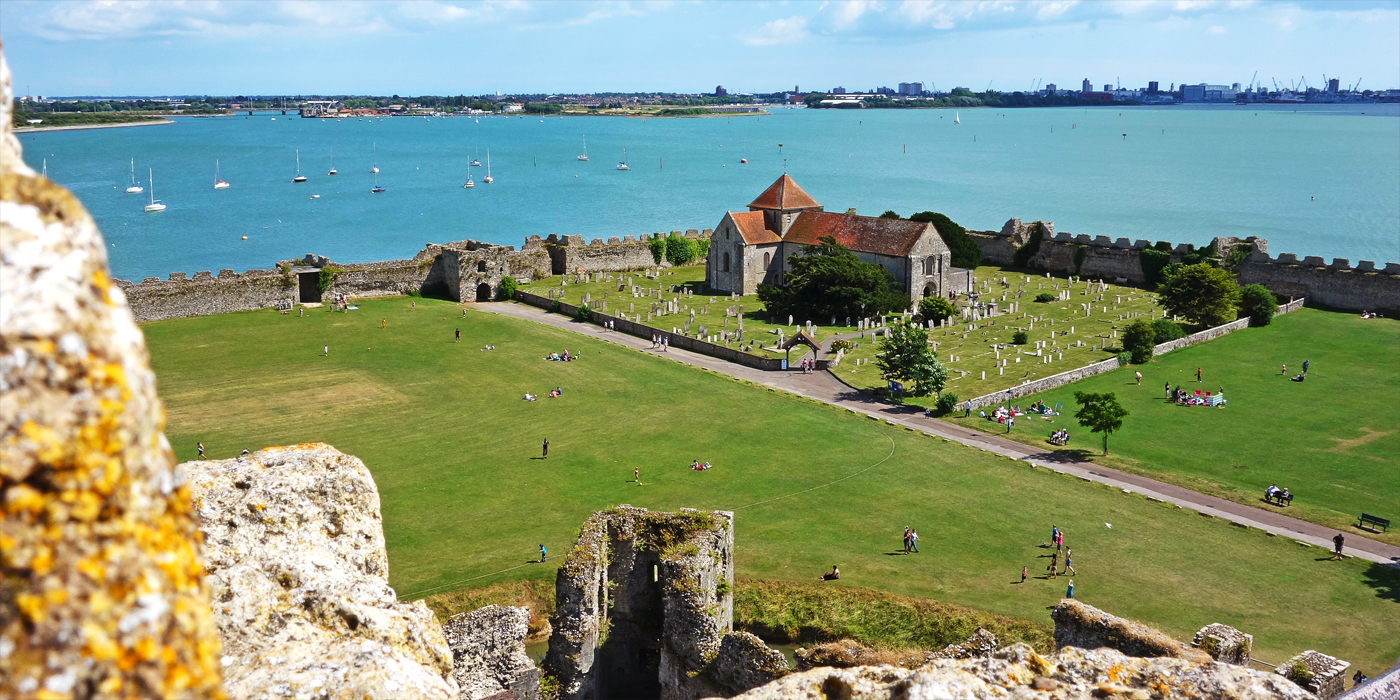
The outer bailey with St Mary’s Church, as seen from the keep

It is uncertain when the castle was built, although it was probably in the late 11th century. In the aftermath of the Norman Conquest, the manor of Portchester was granted to William Maudit, an associate of William the Conqueror and a powerful magnate and it was probably he who built Portchester Castle.

The form of this early castle is uncertain, although Maudit was probably responsible for creating the inner ward in the north-west corner of the fort. At this point it would probably have been defended by a wooden palisade and a moat, with the original Roman stone walls of the fort acting as the defence of the outer bailey. Maudit died in about 1100, and his property passed onto his son, Robert Maudit. He died in 1120, and a few years later the family estates came into the hands of William Pont de l'Arche through marriage to Robert Maudit's daughter.

Although the castle was still unrecorded in this period, it was probably at this point that it was rebuilt in stone. The evidence for this is that the stonework of the castle is similar to that of St Mary's parish church, which was built in the 1130s in the outer bailey. The church was built for an Augustinian priory which Pont de l'Arche established within the castle in 1128. Other buildings would have been planned for the priory, although almost no trace of them survives. As the community moved to a new site at Southwick between 1147 and 1150, the buildings may never have been completed.

William Pont de l'Arche probably retained possession of Portchester Castle until his death in 1148, although who inherited it is uncertain. It may have passed to William Maudit, a descendant of the Maudit who most likely founded the castle, or Henry Maudit, William de l'Arche's son. The earliest extant reference to the castle is in a grant from 1153 in which Henry Plantagenet, later King Henry II granted the castle to Henry Maudit. Regardless, when Henry ascended to the throne in 1154 he took over possession of Portchester Castle. It would remain in royal control for several centuries. More records survive from the castle's period as a royal fortress than the previous period; the royal accounts provide details of the castle's condition and structure. For instance, as only small sums were spent on the keep during the royal tenure, it is assumed that it was largely complete, and in 1183 the Rolls record that there were royal apartments separate from the keep. Henry II regularly visited Portchester, and it featured in his dispute with Thomas Becket.

It was here that Henry met with the Bishop of Évreux who spoke on Becket's behalf. The castle was also used as a prison for important people, such as the Earl of Leicester. When Henry II's sons rebelled against him with the support of some leading barons in the Revolt of 1173–1174, Portchester was made ready for war. In preparation to defend the castle, catapults were made and it was garrisoned with ten knights, later increased to 20.

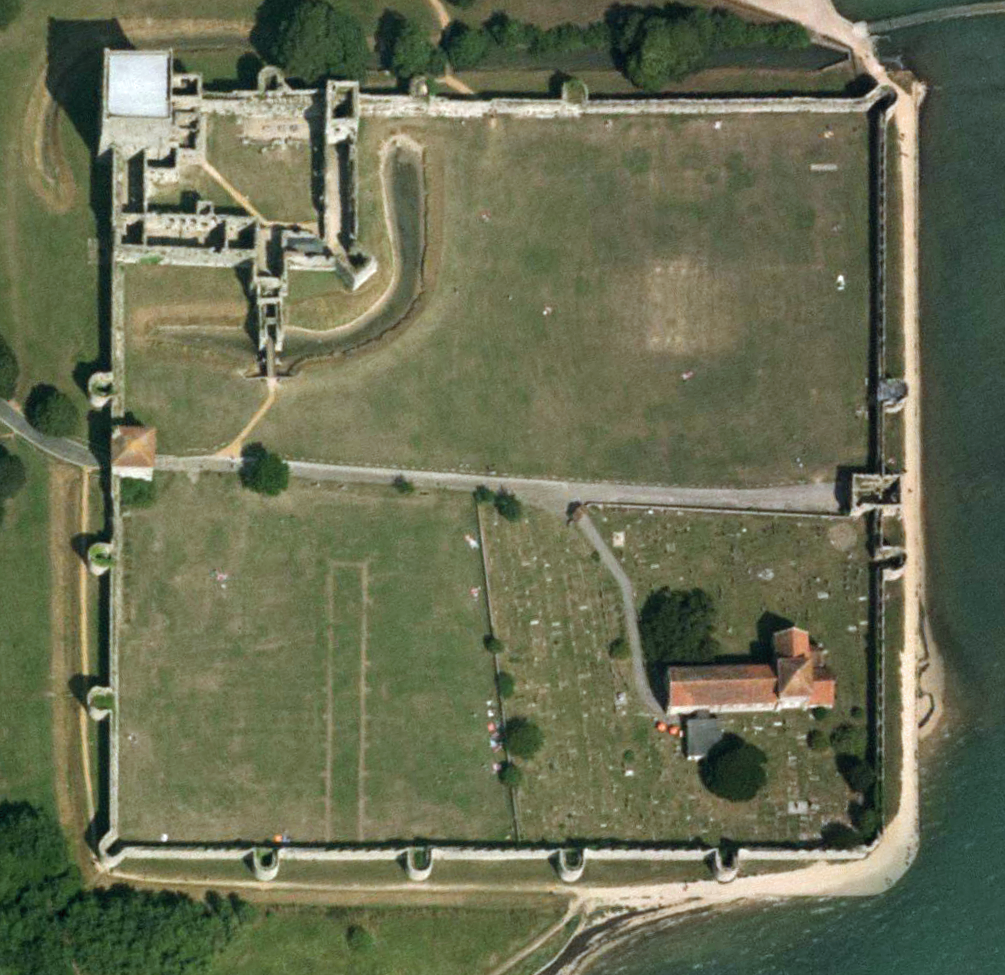
Aerial image of the Roman fort, with the medieval castle at top left, and the church at bottom right

King John often stayed at Portchester Castle and was there when he heard of the Loss of Normandy in 1204. The Forest of Bere was nearby, making Portchester a popular place for the king to stay recreationally. Portchester was also the departure point of missions to France in 1205 and 1213 as John tried to recover Normandy from Philip Augustus, the King of France. John's trips to France ended in defeat.

After sealing Magna Carta in 1215, John appealed to the pope to annul it. As a result, his opponents were excommunicated in September. At this point, he laid siege to Rochester Castle and the rebels turned to France for help. The barons offered the throne to Prince Louis, the oldest son of the French king. Louis' campaign was initially successful and he captured London and Winchester before Portchester Castle surrendered to his forces in June 1216. John died on 19 October 1216, and nine days later his eldest son was crowned King Henry. Louis' fortunes took a turn for the worse, and Portchester Castle was recaptured in the spring of 1217. Henry III, John's son and successor, ordered the destruction of the castle in April 1217 but the orders were never followed.

There was a stalemate between Henry III and Louis until the English victory at the Battle of Lincoln on 20 May. After his supply lines with France were cut in August, Louis was bribed to leave England. Henry tried to recapture Normandy, which was lost by his predecessor, until conditions in England forced him to abandon them in 1259, and Portchester was a frequent departure point for troops on campaign.

For most of the century little attention was paid to the castle's defences, however towards the end of the century a wooden tower was built to reinforce the eastern Roman wall. During the reign of Edward II (1307–1327), a French invasion was anticipated and Portchester garrisoned. The Crown spent more than £1,100 repairing and reinforcing Portchester Castle between 1320 and 1326. The buildings of the inner ward were remodelled and the outer gatehouses extended.

Despite the expensive work undertaken by Edward II, a survey of 1335 recorded that many of the castle's buildings were in a ruinous state, and the south wall of the Roman fort had been damaged by the sea. Although he infrequently stayed at Portchester, in June 1346 Edward III assembled his 15,000 strong army there before leaving for France on the campaign that ended in victory at the Battle of Crécy.

Further work was carried out in the 1350s and 1360s when the domestic buildings within the castle were reordered and the sea wall repaired. Between 1396 and 1399 the royal apartments that stand today, albeit in a ruined state, were built for Richard II under master mason Walter Walton.

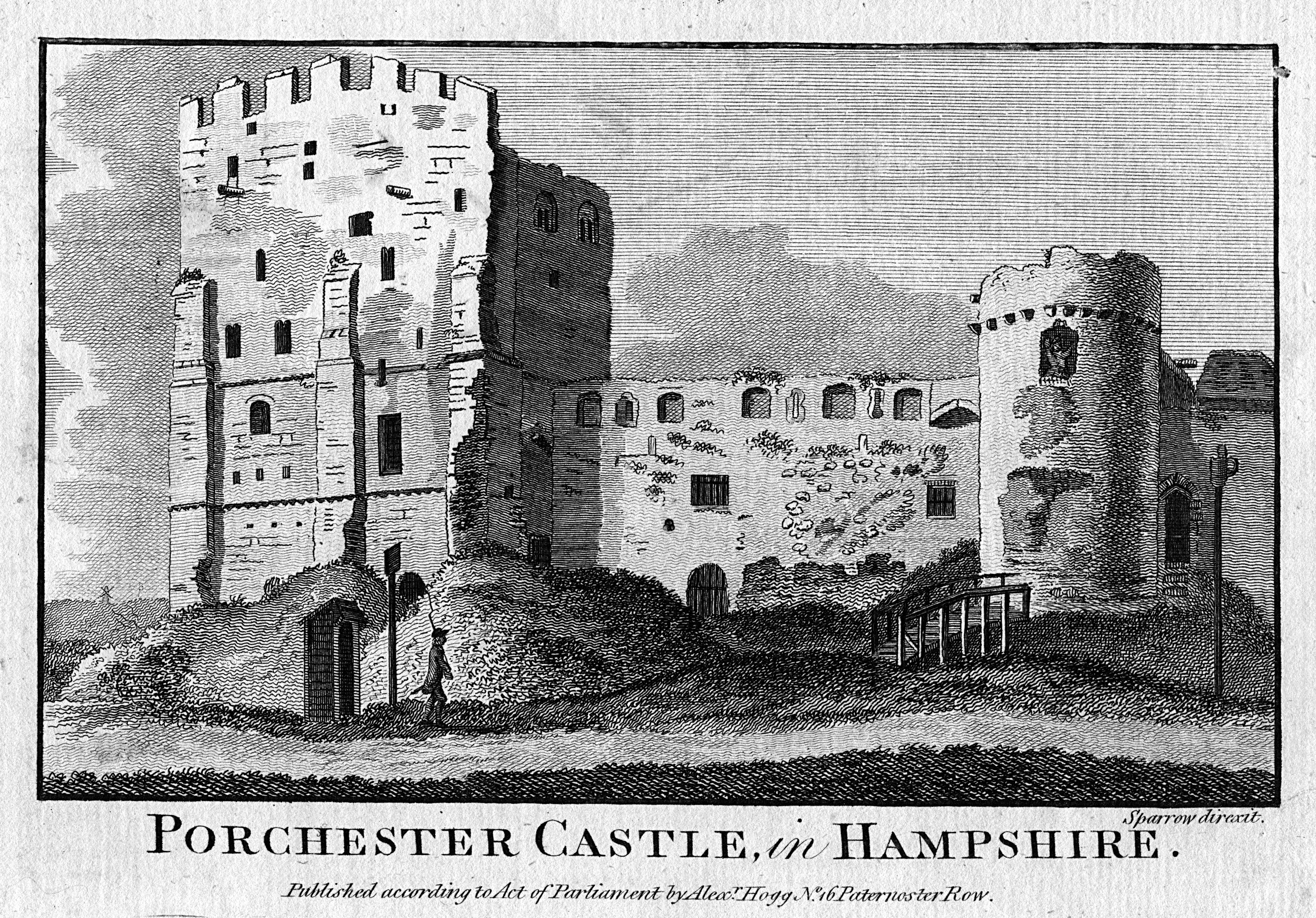
View of Portchester Castle from Picturesque Views of the Antiquities of England & Wales (1786)

In 1415, King Henry V was making preparations at Portchester Castle for a campaign in France, part of the Hundred Years' War between the two countries. While at Portchester in July a conspiracy, known as the Southampton Plot, to overthrow Henry was uncovered.

It was at the castle that he arrested the conspirators: Richard of Conisburgh, 3rd Earl of Cambridge, Henry Scrope, 3rd Baron Scrope of Masham, and Sir Thomas Grey. The three men were executed in early August.

In the 15th century the nearby town of Portsmouth some six miles (ten kilometres) away grew to become a significant economic centre and an important port. It took over from Portchester as a place of military importance, and the castle entered a period of decline. A survey from 1441 noted the castle was "right ruinous and feeble". Despite its state, when Margaret of Anjou, wife of Henry VI, landed in England in 1445, Portchester Castle was selected as her port of arrival. The castle was allowed to continue to languish until the last decade of the century attempts were made to repair the castle's buildings. When Henry VIII visited with Queen Anne Boleyn in 1535 October, it was the first time in over a century that the reigning monarch had been to the castle.

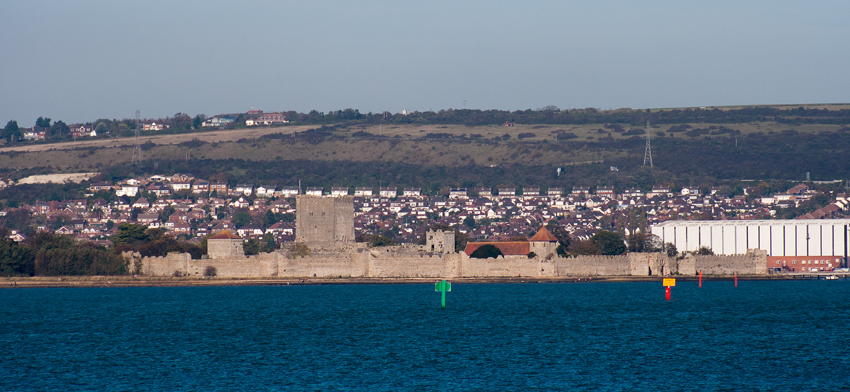
Portchester Castle from seawards

Between October 1562 and June 1563, the English occupied the port of Le Havre on France's northern coast. During this period the castle acted as a military hospital for those involved in the conflict with France. With relations with Spain worsening, Elizabeth I made Portchester Castle ready for war, anticipating a Spanish invasion. At that time Henry Radcliffe future Earl of Sussex, was Constable.

On 30 August 1591 Elizabeth came to the castle, but the floors of the state chambers were rotten, and she had dinner in the bedchamber of the keeper. Instead of her usual sweet perfumes the chamber was freshened with rue and hyssop. By 1603 the castle was in a fit state for Elizabeth to hold court there. Sir Thomas Cornwallis was made constable and remodelled the buildings along the eastern side of the inner bailey. A royal survey from 1609 documents the castle's improved condition, noting that the buildings built by Cornwallis contained "four fair lodging chambers above and as many rooms for office below".

== Use as a prison ==
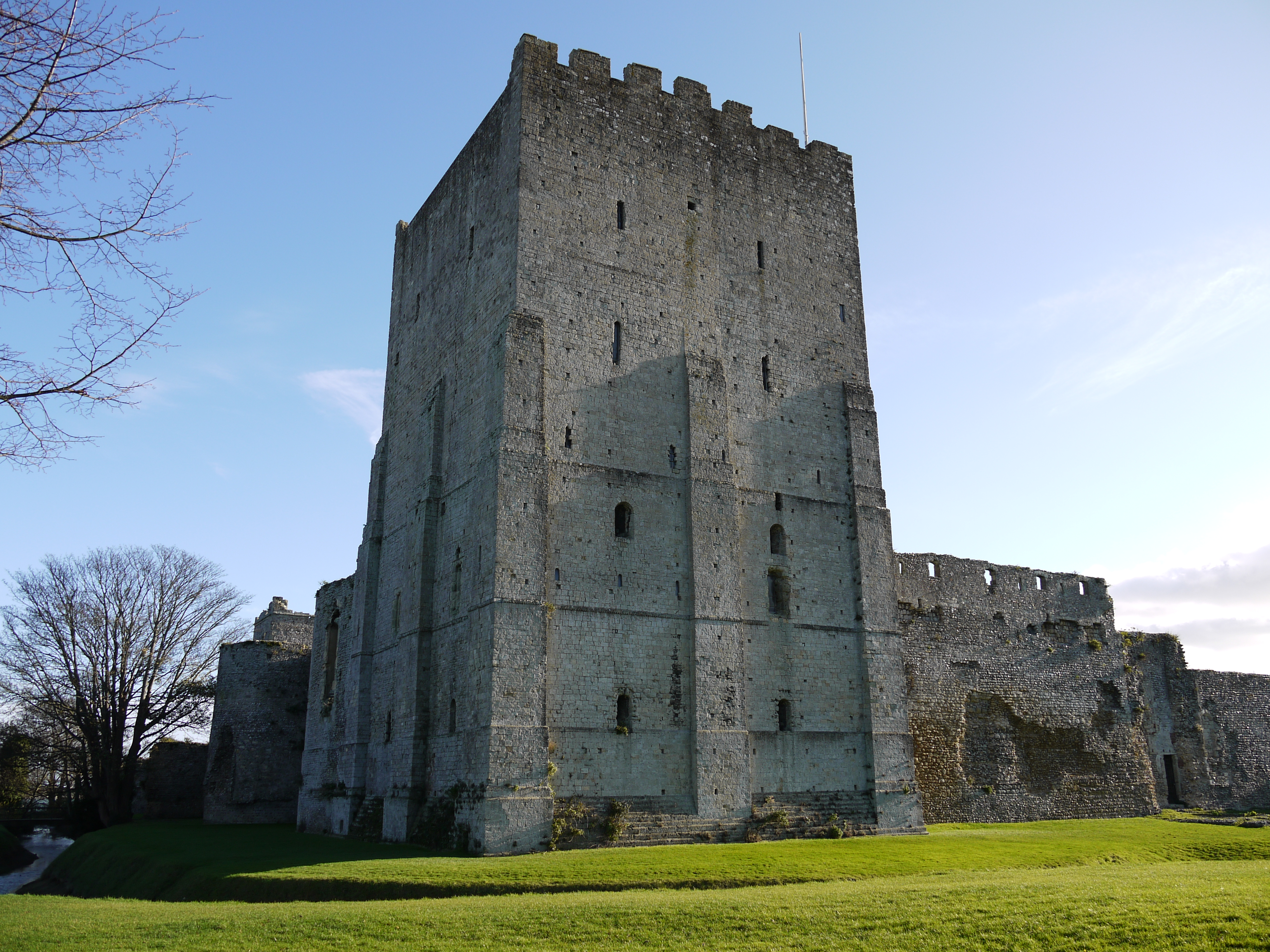
The Norman keep with its external buttresses

The castle passed out of royal control in 1632 when Charles I sold it to Sir William Uvedale. Since then, Portchester Castle has passed through his successors, the Thistlethwaite family. The castle did not witness fighting during the English Civil War, though for a short time in 1644 it was garrisoned by Parliamentarian dragoons.

One of the roles castles commonly filled was that of a prison. From the late 17th century onwards this became Portchester's most important function. In 1665, 500 prisoners from the Second Anglo-Dutch War (1665–1667) were held at the castle. Some were housed in the church in the outer bailey. They damaged the building by setting it on fire. The church was not repaired until some 40 years later. Between 1702 and 1712 the Crown leased Portchester Castle from the Uvedales to incarcerate prisoners from the War of the Spanish Succession. The first detailed accounts of the prisoners' conditions come from the middle of the century.

External audio
- The Caribbean Prisoners of Portchester Castle, Speaking with Shadows, published by English Heritage, retrieved 23 October 2019

It was last used in the 19th century as a gaol for over 7,000 French prisoners of the Napoleonic Wars. Hospital Lane (formerly Seagates Lane), which flanks the western side of the castle, was the location of the prison hospital which survives today as Portchester House, a private residence. Those that died in captivity were often buried in what are now tidal mudflats to the south of the castle, their remains occasionally disturbed by storms.

A plaque commemorating the 2,500 prisoners of war who were incarcerated at the castle in 1796 was unveiled in October 2026. It was organised by the St Vincent and the Grenadines 2nd Generation (SV2G) group, working in partnership with the University of Warwick and English Heritage. The plaque was stolen a few days after its unveiling.

== Today ==
Today Portchester Castle is open to visitors and is also used for recreation: the inner section of the castle accommodates displays and exhibits. The castle is a popular venue for school outings, while the sea wall is frequented at high tide by anglers in pursuit of flounder and bass. The castle buildings are in the care of English Heritage.

== Local legends ==
Local legend states that late in his life Pontius Pilate was brought here by galley as a final refuge.

== See also ==
- Constable of Portchester Castle
- Castles in Great Britain and Ireland
- HMS Portchester Castle
- List of castles in England
