= Mike Bernard (painter) =

English painter

Mike Bernard (born 1957) is an English painter. His highly textured semi-abstract paintings are often executed in mixed media incorporating collage and acrylics; he also brings an experimental approach to watercolour and oils. Regular subjects include coastal and street scenes in the English West Country and Italy. "What attracts me most is the pattern of buildings, boats and similar features in a scene. I build a painting by putting in blocks of colour to develop a pattern which is pleasing to my eye in colours which are harmonious, bringing in feelings of spontaneity, freshness and freedom."

Bernard was born in Dover, Kent. He trained at the West Surrey College of Art and Design, Farnham, followed by postgraduate studies at the Royal Academy Schools. Since then he has exhibited at the Royal Academy summer exhibition, Mall Galleries, Royal Festival Hall and many other galleries in London and the provinces. He has also gained awards and prizes for his paintings, including the Stowells Trophy, the Elizabeth Greenshield Fellowship, Silver Longboat Award and Laing Award. He was elected a member of the Royal Institute of Painters in Water Colours (RI) in 1997 and in the 1999 RI Exhibition at the Mall Galleries was awarded the Kingsmead Gallery Award.

Bernard lives and works in North Devon, having moved there in 2008 from Hampshire. He is a regular contributor to The Artist magazine.
