= Emily Stannard (landscape artist) =

English artist known for painting (1875–1906)

- Born: 27 January 1875; Eversholt, Bedfordshire, England
- Died: 31 March 1906 (aged 31); Bedford, England
- Known for: Watercolours,
- Notable work: On the Ouse (1893), Spring in Bedfordshire (1898)
- Movement: Landscape painting, Victorian Genre painting.
- Awards: Royal Institute of Painters in Watercolours, Royal Society of British Artists

Emily Stannard RI (1875–1906) was an English painter, primarily of watercolours. (Note: Emily Stannard who was one of several family members across three generations of Bedfordshire artists is sometimes confused with Emily Stannard (1802 – 1885), a still-life painter who usually signed her work Mrs Joseph Stannard. She was associated with the Norwich School of painters, most of whom were active in the first part of the 19th-century. Some members of the Bedfordshire Stannards believed there was a family connection to the Norwich Stannards. If there was then it was likely back several generations.) Her professional career was short lasting from 1896 to her early death in 1906. She is known for her rural landscapes of her native Bedfordshire which are in the tradition of Victorian romanticism and naturalism. One of five children of the sporting painter Henry Stannard (1844–1920), all of whom painted Emily Stannard was especially adept at capturing the beauty and solitude of the Bedfordshire countryside. She exhibited seven watercolours at the Royal Academy of Arts in London between 1900 and 1903.

== Life and career ==
Emily Stannard was born in Eversholt in Bedfordshire on 27 January 1875, the second child of Henry Stannard (1844–1920), a sporting painter and art teacher and his wife Ruth Willsher. She was one of five siblings, all of whom were taught to paint by their father. Her sister Lilian Stannard (1877–1944) was a successful artist of watercolours specialising in garden paintings who exhibited at the Royal Academy from 1902 to 1930. Her brother Henry Sylvester Stannard (1870–1951) was also a successful painter. Her other siblings Ivy Stannard (1881–1968) and Alexander Molyneux Stannard (1878–1975) were primarily skilled amateur artists, the later earning his living as an art tutor.

Emily Stannard attended Howard College in Bedford, a private institution for girls established in 1852. An aptitude for art, no doubt aided by instruction from her father Henry, led to success in the Public Examinations and acceptance at the National Art Training School, renamed the Royal College of Art in 1895, in South Kensington, London, at that time primarily a teacher-training establishment. She had already had local success, with a watercolour inspired by her enthusiasm for the Bedfordshire countryside winning first prize for amateurs at the 1893 Bedford Art Exhibition. Another painting Newnham Bridge was commended. Stannard turned professional in 1896 shortly before her twenty-second birthday. In 1897 she exhibited two watercolours On The Ouse and At Close of Day at the annual Crystal Palace exhibition and at the Royal Society of British Artists In 1898 she exhibited a watercolour at the 82nd Annual Exhibition of the Royal Institute of Painters In Watercolours, a favoured institution where she also exhibited in 1901 and 1902.

Aged twenty four years Emily Stannard contracted tuberculosis, a severe illness that stopped her fledgling career. She returned to the family home in Bedford to recuperate. The nature of the illness led to long periods of physical inactivity that considerably restricted her artistic output for her remaining years. Nevertheless, between 1900 and 1903 she exhibited seven watercolours at the Royal Academy of Arts in Piccadilly in West London and at important regional galleries that included the City Art Gallery in Leeds where she sold four paintings between 1997 and 1899; the Manchester City Art Gallery where two exhibited pictures sold in 1901 and in Sheffield where she entered eleven paintings between 1900 and 1905 at the Sheffield Annual Exhibition. Her father who had opened an Art School in Bedford displayed one of her final paintings in a local exhibition in 1905. The painting was described thus ....An extremely pretty river scene, with a summery foreground, and a distance beautifully broken by elms and willows ... Stannard was described by her biographer Anthony J.Lester as able .... to capture the beauty and solitude of the Bedfordshire brooks and her ability in transmitting onto paper the glimmering rays of sunlight upon the leaves of elms and willows is quite remarkable ..... Two examples of her work Bromham Bridge and Mill and Newnham Bridge are on display in her home town at the Old Town Hall, Bedford.

Emily Stannard died in Bedford on 31 March 1906 and was buried at Bedford Cemetery.

== Bibliography ==
- Morgan, Richard (2018), Henry John Sylvester Stannard And His daughter Theresa Sylvester Stannard, Bedfordshire Local History Association, ISBN 9781905269242
- Lester, Anthony J (1984), The Stannards of Bedfordshire: A Family of Watercolour Painters Patronized by Royalty. England: Eastbourne Fine Arts.ISBN 0902010115
- Lester, Anthony J (1976), Henry John Sylvester Stannard: His Life, Work and Family, Antique Collecting, Sept 1976

== Gallery (selected) ==
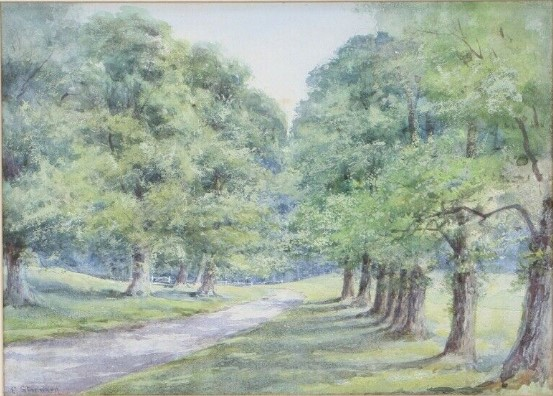

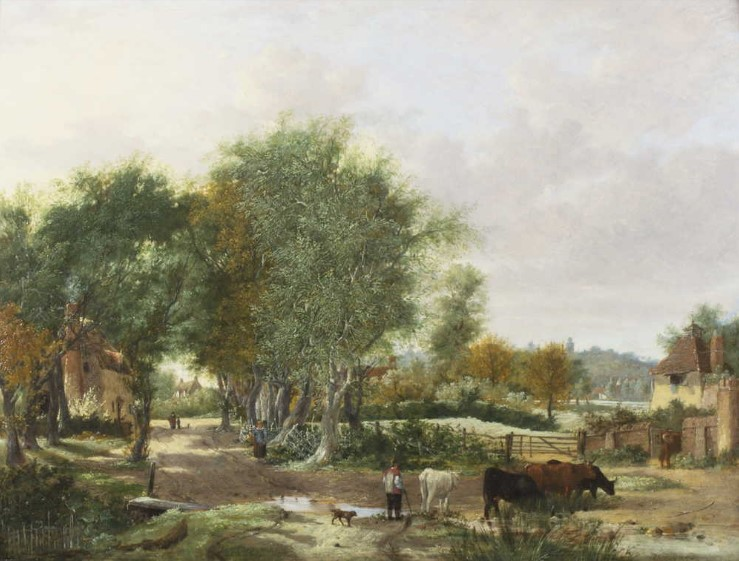

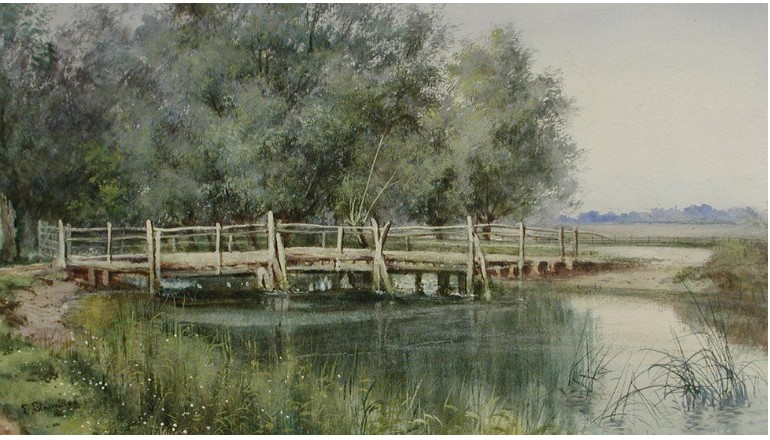

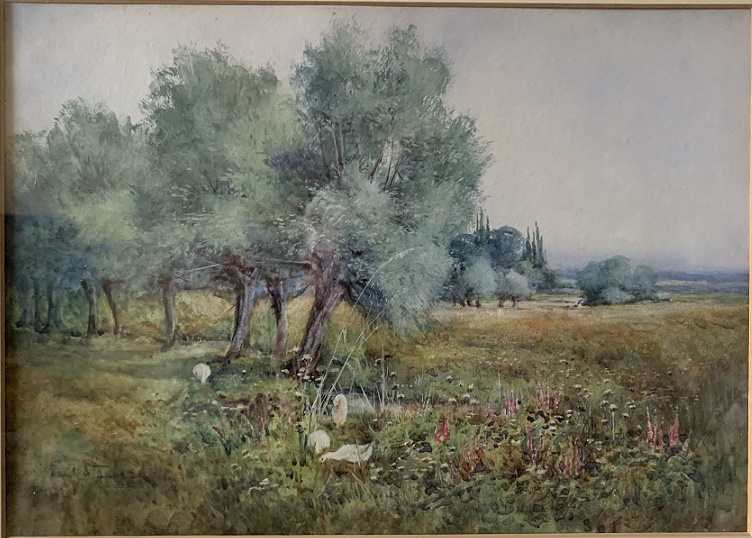

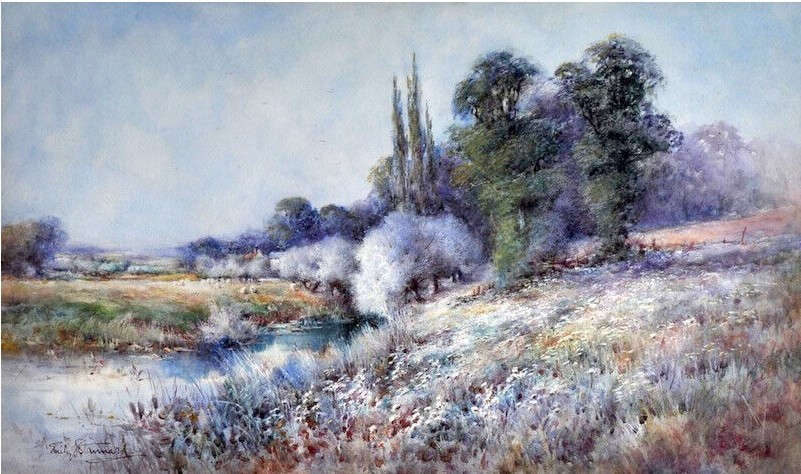

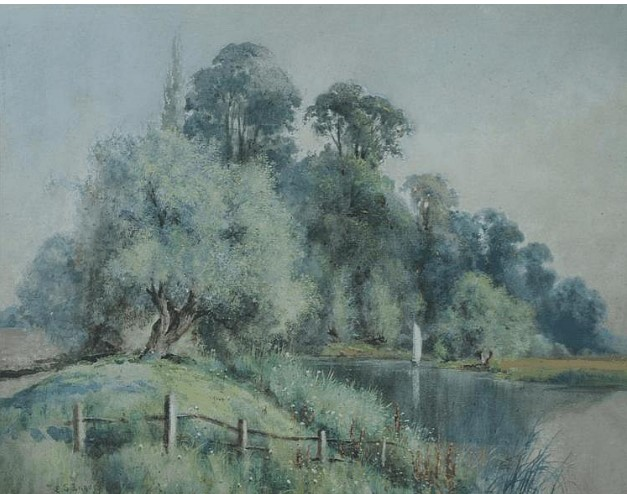
