= Portchester Community School =

School in Portchester, Hampshire, England

Coordinates: 50.84219°N 1.12747°W

Location
- White Hart Lane; Portchester, Hampshire, PO16 9BD; England

Information
- Type: Comprehensive community school
- Religious affiliation: Christian
- Established: 1939
- Local authority: Hampshire
- Department for Education URN: 116418 Tables
- Ofsted: Reports
- Head teacher: Richard Carlyle
- Staff: 116
- Gender: Coeducational
- Age: 11 to 16
- Enrolment: 654
- Website: portchester.hants.sch.uk

Portchester Community School is a mixed comprehensive community school for 11- to 16-year-olds in Portchester, England.

As of January 2015, the date of the last Ofsted inspection, the school has been rated overall as 'good'.
