= Thistlethwayte =

Thistlethwayte is a surname. Notable people with the surname include:

- Alexander Thistlethwayte (1636–1716), English politician
- Rai Thistlethwayte (born 1980) is an Australian rock, pop and jazz musician and songwriter
- Robert Thistlethwayte (1690–1744), warden of an Oxford College
- Robert Thistlethwayte (MP) (1755–1802), English politician
- Thomas Thistlethwayte (1779–1850), English politician

== See also ==
- Thistlethwaite
