= Portchester =

Village and parish in Hampshire, England

Coordinates: 50°50′31″N 1°07′12″W

- Village
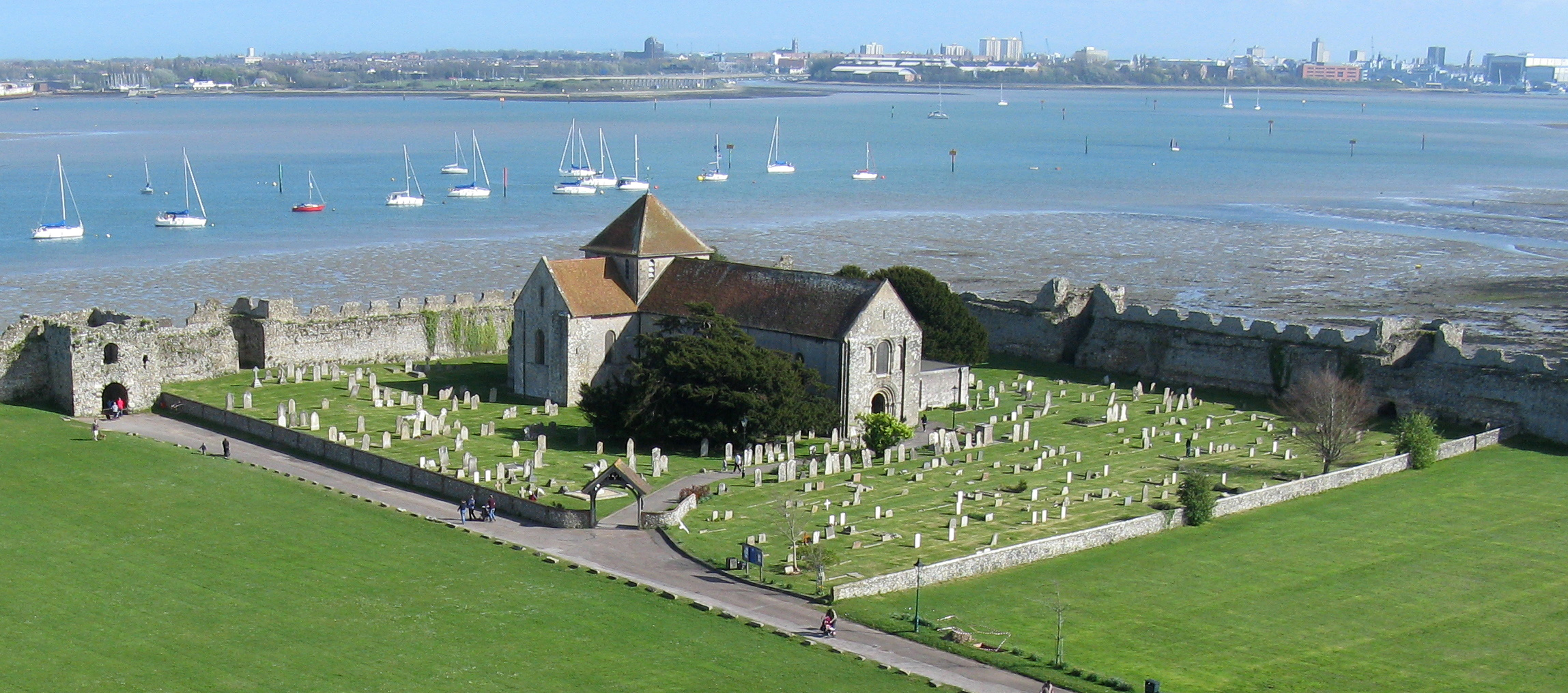
- Aerial view of St Mary's Church, Portchester, with Portsmouth city skyline in background.

- Location within Hampshire
- Population: 17,789 (2011 Census. Wards)
- OS grid reference: SU6105
- District: Fareham
- Shire county: Hampshire
- Region: South East
- Country: England
- Sovereign state: United Kingdom
- Post town: FAREHAM
- Postcode district: PO16 - PO17
- Dialling code: 023/01329
- Police: Hampshire and Isle of Wight
- Fire: Hampshire and Isle of Wight
- Ambulance: South Central
- UK Parliament: Fareham and Waterlooville

Portchester is a village in the borough of Fareham in Hampshire, England. It is 4 miles (6.4 km) northwest of Portsmouth and around 18 miles east of Southampton on the A27 road. Its population according to the 2011 United Kingdom census was 17,789.

== Name ==
Portchester is derived from its former Latin name Portus Adurni and the Old English suffix ceaster ("fort; fortified town"), itself derived from the Latin word "castrum."

== History ==
The fort of Portus Adurni is considered the best-preserved Roman fort north of the Alps. It is sometimes identified as the Caer Peris listed by the 9th-century History of the Britons as among the 28 cities of Britain. The medieval Portchester Castle was built within the Roman fort.

In 1931 the civil parish had a population of 2267. On 1 April 1932 the parish was abolished and merged with Fareham and Portsmouth. It is now in the unparished area of Fareham.

== Amenities ==
As well as the castle, its parish church St Mary's is listed as a Grade I protected building. There are also many historic houses in Castle Street. This suburb is well placed for waterfront leisure activities, only a short distance from the UK's 3rd-largest marina at Port Solent, from the historic city of Portsmouth, and from the market town of Fareham.

=== Public open spaces ===
- Portchester Castle
- Portsdown Hill – Including Portchester Common a Site of Special Scientific Interest (SSSI)
- Wicor Recreation Ground – Home to A.F.C. Portchester and Wicor Skate Park.
- Wicor Shore

=== Schools ===
- Portchester Community School, a mixed comprehensive community school for 11- to 16-year-olds.
- Wicor Primary School
- Northern Infant School
- Northern Junior School
- Red Barn Primary School
- Castle Primary School

=== Crematorium ===
Opened in 1958, it is on the lower slopes of Portsdown Hill. It is owned by a Joint Committee representing the City of Portsmouth and the Boroughs of Fareham, Havant and Gosport. It has two chapels, the North (added 1969) and South (original). Those cremated there include two World War I Victoria Cross recipients, Norman Augustus Finch and James Ockendon who both died in 1966.

== Sport and leisure ==
Portchester has a Non-League football club A.F.C. Portchester, which plays at Wicor Recreation Ground.

== Notable residents ==
- Neil Astley, publisher and founding editor of Bloodaxe Books, born in Portchester
- Emily Farmer, watercolour painter
- Neil Gaiman, author, born in Portchester
- Steve Ridgway, Chief Executive, Virgin Atlantic Airways
- Mike Hancock, former MP for Portsmouth South and former Councilor for Fratton ward, has lived in Portchester for over 30 years

== Transport ==
=== Rail ===
Portchester railway station is managed and operated by South Western Railway with frequent Southern Railway services. Services run along the coast to Southampton, Fareham, Portsmouth, Havant, Chichester and Brighton. London services to London Waterloo (via Fareham) and London Victoria (via Barnham) also stop at the station.

=== Bus services ===
First Hampshire & Dorset services to Portsmouth, Havant, Fareham, Titchfield, Locks Heath and Warsash.

=== Road ===
The A27 road bisects Portchester east–west between Fareham and Cosham on the northern outskirts of Portsmouth. Access to the M27 motorway is via Junction 11 at Fareham or Junction 12 at Port Solent.

== See also ==
- A.F.C. Portchester
- List of places of worship in the Borough of Fareham
- Portchester Community School
