= Sam Dodwell =

English painter

Samuel William Dodwell RI (1909 in Wandsworth, London – 1990 in Truro) was an English painter.

== Life and work ==
Sam Dodwell discovered painting at an early age and at the age of 18, while visiting Cornwall on holiday, decided that the county would be his future home. He was initially prevented from this ambition by family pressure and by the Depression, and took up a career in banking. He rose to the top of a US bank in London and also served through World War II as an RAF Squadron Leader.

In his late fifties, he suffered three major heart attacks. After then experimental open-heart surgery, predicted to give him four more years of life, he lived 23 years, during which he achieved his ambition. moving to Cornwall to take up a career as prolific painter.

He painted daily, his works inspired by regional subjects, in various media: oils, charcoal, gouache or watercolour. His style was inspired by Impressionism, especially Cézanne, and later Cubism.

During his career he exhibited at the Royal Academy, Royal Society of British Artists, Royal Society of Portrait Painters and the Royal Institute of Painters in Water Colours (of which he was an elected member). His commissions included large sunflower paintings for the Imperial Hotel, Torquay, and a mural for the American Chamber of Commerce in London. He also taught at schools, art societies, studio groups, via television and also to Prince Charles.

He was closely associated with the Mid-Cornwall Galleries at St Blazey Gate from their creation in 1980; he is commemorated at this venue by a Sam Dodwell Gallery. A major retrospective exhibition, including some 50 of his works, was staged there in February 2007.
