= John R. Thistlethwaite =

American journalist

John Richmond Thistlethwaite Jr.
- Born: July 16, 1918; Washington, Louisiana, US
- Died: April 6, 1996 (aged 77); Opelousas, Louisiana, US
- Education: B. A. Tulane University, 1939; Journalism
- Known for: Founder of the Daily World; First daily photo-offset newspaper
- Spouse: Patricia Ann Norman
- Children: 5 sons

John R. Thistlethwaite Jr. (July 16, 1918 – April 6, 1996) was an American journalist who founded the Daily World of Opelousas, Louisiana on December 24, 1939, the first American small town daily newspaper to use offset and photo-offset printing. Ducote “Duke” Andrepont was the newspaper's cofounder.

Photo-offset is a method of offset printing using photomechanical plates. A photographic image is first taken of a "dummy" version of a newspaper, and the image is then transferred to chemically treated plates. The plates transfer the image to a rubber "blanket" which is wrapped around a cylinder of a printing press which then contacts paper to print the newspaper. The first edition of the World was a tabloid style newspaper of thirty-eight pages, and used two colors on its front page. As a tabloid, it had a local focus, a smaller circulation, and its pages were smaller in size than a traditional broadsheet newspaper.

As recognition of its contribution to journalism through the groundbreaking use of photo-offset printing in a daily newspaper, a copy of the first edition of the Daily World resides in the Smithsonian Institution in Washington, D. C. Offset printing and photo-offset printing remain the primary means of printing newspapers today.

== Early life ==
John R. Thistlethwaite Jr. was born into what would become a family of five children on July 16, 1918, in Washington, Louisiana, to John Richmond Thistlethwaite Sr., and Charlotte Frere Thistlethwaite. Thistlewaite's father died during the depression in 1934. Thistlethwaite attended Tulane University, where he received a Bachelor of Arts in journalism in the spring of 1939. During his years at Tulane, he was editor of the Tulane Jambalaya university yearbook and on the editorial staff of the school's student newspaper, the Tulane Hullabaloo.

After 1941, during World War II, Rigby Owen served as the World's editor while Thistlethwaite was a Marine aviator who attained the rank of captain flying the fast and effective F4U Corsair in the South Pacific. In the early years of the war the Corsair was largely deployed with land-based Marine squadrons, but also functioned less frequently as a carrier fighter for the Marines on smaller escort carriers in later years of the war. Thistlethwaite resumed his editor and publisher duties on his return from the war.

== Creation of Daily World ==
Unable to find employment as a journalist during the depression, at the age of twenty-one Thistlethwaite and his friend Ducote Andrepont decided to start their own newspaper in Opelousas, despite the small town already having two newspapers, the weekly Clarion News, and semi-weekly Opeloussas Herald. Their greatest obstacle was the challenge many newspapers faced from a diminishing circulation due to the effects of the depression.

Both Thistlethwaite and Andrepont first attended technical school and visited other print offices to become familiar with the newspaper industry and the challenges presented by offset printing. Thistlethwaite attended the Technical Trade School at Pressman's Home, Tenn., and interviewed trade authorities in a number of states to obtain more information about journalism and how he could effectively use photo-offset printing to publish his small town newspaper.

The first edition of the Daily World was printed on December 24, 1939, at 226 W. Landry St. in downtown Opelousas. In October 1940, nine months after printing its first edition, Daily World printed a statement of ownership listing John Thistlethwaite as the primary publisher of the newspaper and noted eight original primary stock holders from Louisiana. These included their publishing company World News Incorporated, John Thistlethwaite, his Uncle Hugh, his mother Charlotte, and his partner D. Andrepont; the primary mortgagees included Mergenthaler Linotype, the leading system of the era for casting metal type in lines.

== Daily World original staff ==
Ducote Andrepont, the son of an Opelousas publisher, and a journalism major at Louisiana State and the University of Oklahoma, served as advertising manager for the World and secretary-treasurer of the newspaper's publisher, World News Company Inc. Thistlethwaite served as President of their publishing company World News.

Jim Fitzgibbons served as the newspaper's original managing editor, supporting the advertising efforts of the paper, and managing the paper's business concerns. Fitzgibbons, of Monahans, Texas, had gained recognition for the sale of his newspaper, the Monahans Express, one of the first newspapers in America to use photo-offset printing. It was his experience in this innovative printing method that caused Daily World publishers to ask him to join their staff. Burton Grindstaff, of Hugo, Oklahoma, served as the newspaper's first editor, where he managed the news department and wrote a daily comment column. John's mother, Charlotte Frere Dubuisson, served originally as society editor. She was a college graduate, a former Washington teacher, and twenty year resident of Opelousas. Bill Lawless, staff photographer, had studied chemical engineering at Tulane University for two years from 1937 to 1938, an education that would help prepare him for the challenges of the photo offset printing process.

Phil Tubesing, an engraver, had studied at the Chicago School of Printing and Lithography to learn the Photo-Offset process. At the Daily World, Tubesing photographed the “dummy” pages of the World and made plates so they could be reproduced on a printing press. Andrew Dossman Jr., the paper's pressman, had also completed a course at the Chicago School of Printing and Lithography, and was responsible for taking the plates from Tubesing and printing the paper. Ralph Hubbard, linotype operator and compositor had twenty five years experience in newspaper work, and specific experience with photo offset printing.

=== Daily World history ===
The Daily World was sold to Worrel Newspapers Inc. in 1972. The New York Times Company acquired eight daily papers, including the TimesDaily, from Worrell in 1982. Gannett Company acquired the Daily World from the Times Company in 2000.

== Death and legacy ==
Thistlethwaite died the morning of Saturday, April 6, 1996, at Opelousas General Hospital, still a resident of Opelousas. Religious services were held at United Methodist Church, Opelousas, on April 9, conducted by the Rev. Ted Standley, and he was buried in the town's Bellevue Memorial Park Cemetery. He was a member of the Boston Club of New Orleans, the board of regent of the Louisiana Universities, a delegate to the Constitutional Convention of 1973, a member of Delta Kappa Epsilon fraternity at Tulane University, a former member of Opelousas City Planning Commission, and a former president of the Louisiana Press Association from 1959 to 1960. He was a recipient of the Chamber of Commerce Citizen of the Year Award and the Sertoma Service to Mankind Award.
