= William Benjamin Sarsfield Taylor =

William Benjamin Sarsfield Taylor (1781–1850) was an Irish artist, a painter of landscapes and military subjects, known also as a writer.

== Life ==
He was the son of John Taylor, a map-engraver in Dublin; through his mother he was descended from Patrick Sarsfield. John Sydney Taylor was his younger brother. He began life in the army commissariat, and served in the Peninsular War, being present at the siege of San Sebastián.

Leaving military service, he devoted himself to art, though with little success. He exhibited landscapes, sea-pieces, and military subjects at the Royal Academy and the British Institution between 1820 and 1847. In 1831 he was a founding member and the first Hon Secretary of the New Society of Painters in Water Colours. He later became better known as an art critic and writer. Towards the close of his life he was curator of the St. Martin's Lane academy. He died on 23 December 1850.

== Works ==
Taylor's best-known book was his History of Dublin University (1845) illustrated with coloured plates and with engravings. It contains biographical notices of many of the alumni of Trinity College, Dublin. He published also The Origin, Progress, and present Conditions of the Fine Arts in Great Britain and Ireland (1841) and A Manual of Fresco and Encaustic Painting (1843). He translated Prosper Mérimée's Art of Painting in Oil and Fresco (1839), and made an abridged translation of the Origin and Progress of the Penitentiary System in the United States (1833), from the report of Gustave de Beaumont and Alexis de Tocqueville.
