= William Cowen =

English painter (1791–1864)

- Born: 18 June 1791; Rotherham, England
- Died: 29 January 1864 (aged 72); Brompton, London, England
- Known for: Water colours and landscape painting

William Cowen (18 June 1791 – 29 January 1864) was an English landscape painter. His work includes views of towns in Yorkshire, Italy, France, Ireland and particularly Corsica.

== Life ==
Cowen was born in Rotherham in 1791 and worked teaching drawing in nearby Sheffield in 1811. Cowen was lucky enough to obtain William Fitzwilliam, 4th Earl Fitzwilliam as a patron, who paid for him to visit Italy via France and Switzerland in 1819 and 1822. In 1824 he published Six Views of Italian and Swiss Scenery, which included his own engravings from his continental tours.

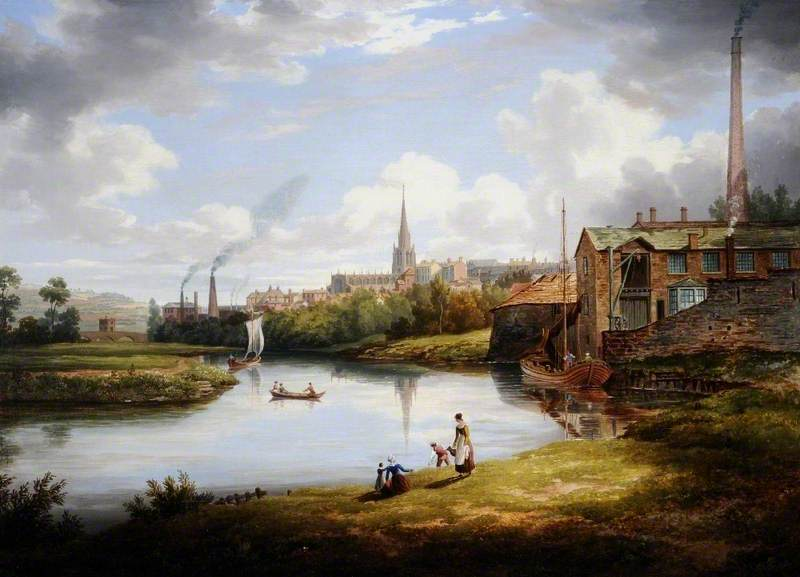
A View of Rotherham by Cowen

In 1826 Ebenezer Rhodes published Yorkshire Scenery, which included Cowen's View of Rotherham as well as two of his drawings of the ruined Roche Abbey. This was intended to be the first volume of a set, but Rhodes failed to make a profit or publish more.

Cowen was one of the eight people who founded the Royal Institute of Painters in Water Colours. The institute was launched with an opening exhibition in 1832 that attracted 300 paintings from 120 artists and, remarkably, made a profit. The organisation is still going but Cowen had left the organising committee by the following year. By this time Cowen had moved to London where he was based when not travelling on sketching trips.

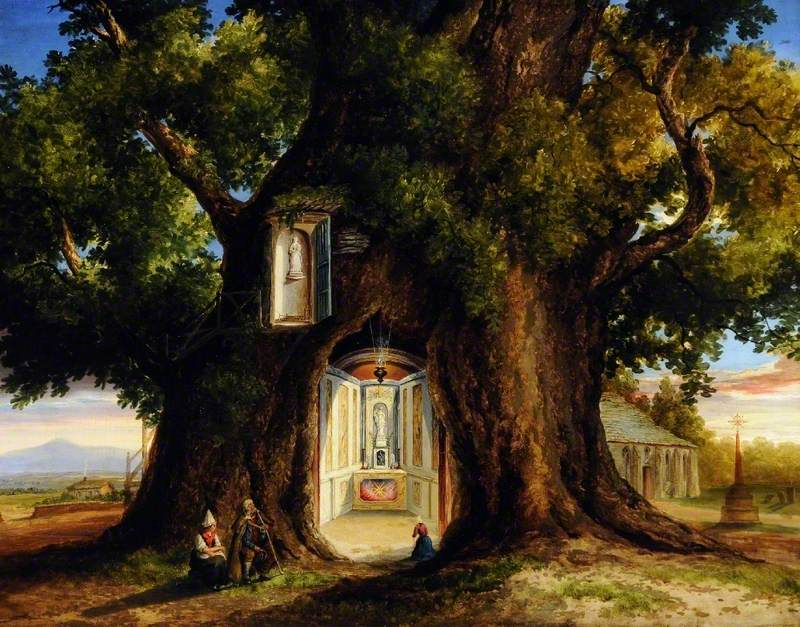
Chapel in the Oak by Cowen

Cowen travelled to Corsica on 12 August 1840, which was seen as novel, and when he returned he completed a number of paintings, several being associated with the early life of the Corsican Napoleon Bonaparte. In 1848 Cowen gathered his Corsican pictures together to create a travelogue entitled Six Weeks in Corsica, illustrated with fourteen engravings. He noted in the book how few visitors the island received and how much Corsica deserved investigation. This book was dedicated to his patron Earl Fitzwilliam. In the same year Cowen also contributed landscapes to the Free Exhibition of Modern Art at Hyde Park Corner. This exhibition was more democratic than those put on by other institutions, attracting those unhappy with bodies such as the Royal Academy.

An 1846 painting of Rotherham parish church indicates that he may have returned to his birthplace but he is known to have recreated paintings from sketches made years before. Cowen died in Brompton in 1864. His residence was Gibraltar Cottage in Thistle Grove.

== Legacy ==
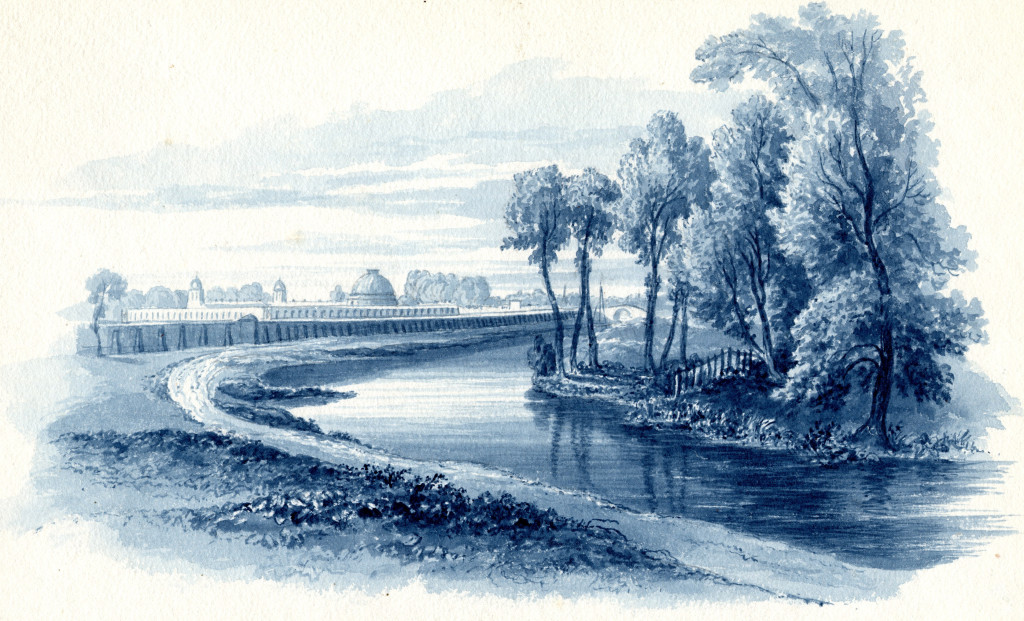
Brompton Cemetery and Kensington Canal by Cowen

Cowen has over a dozen paintings in public collections in the United Kingdom. Several are views of Sheffield and Rotherham and these are in the respective municipal collections. He has eleven water colours in the British Museum and he also painted several views of Italy, France, Ireland and particularly Corsica. 31 sketches around the Royal Borough of Kensington and Chelsea are owned by the local library and the drawings record lost sights like the Kensington Canal and others like the Brompton Cemetery where Cowen is buried.
