= Royal Institute of Painters in Water Colours =

UK artists' association

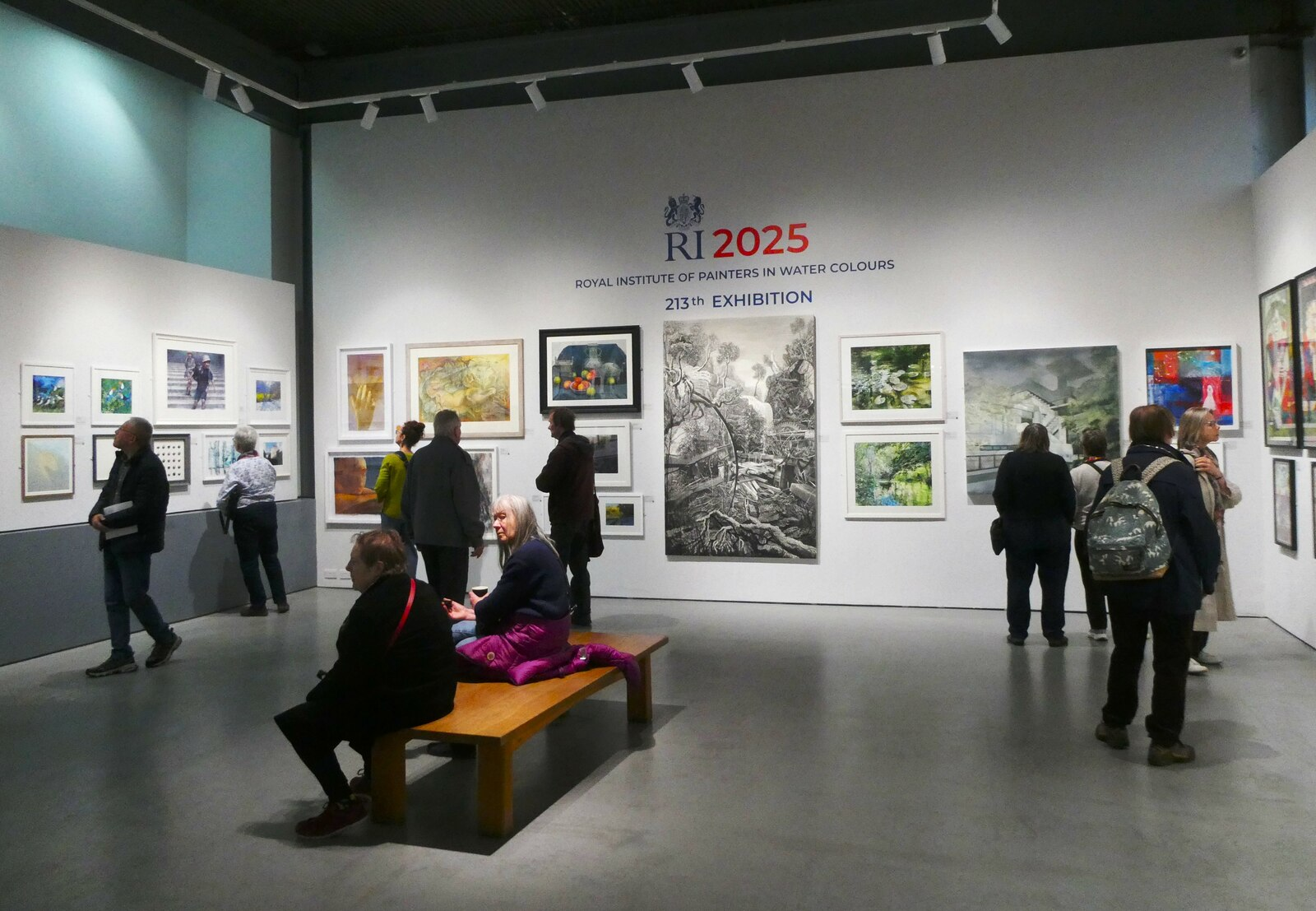
Mall Galleries exhibition, 2025

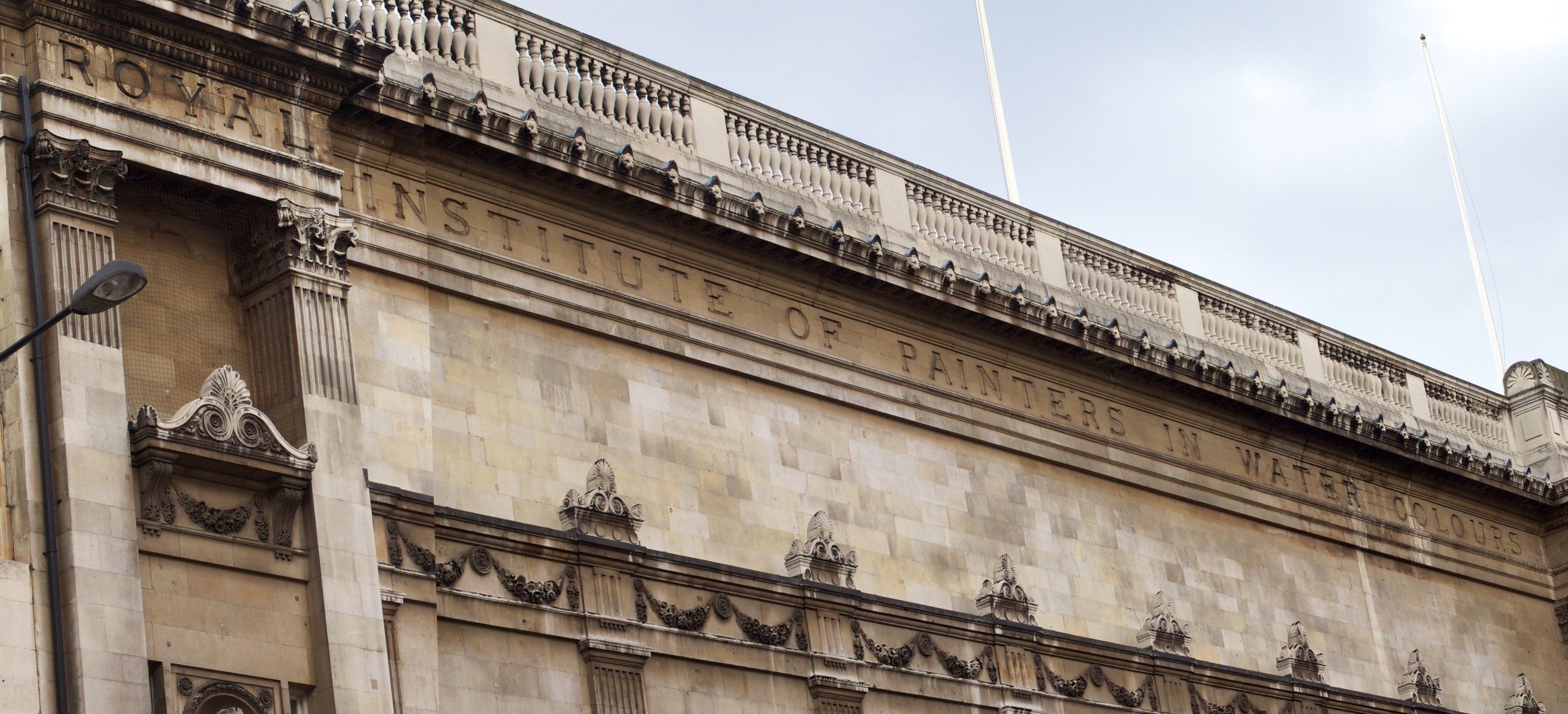
Detail of Picadilly premises

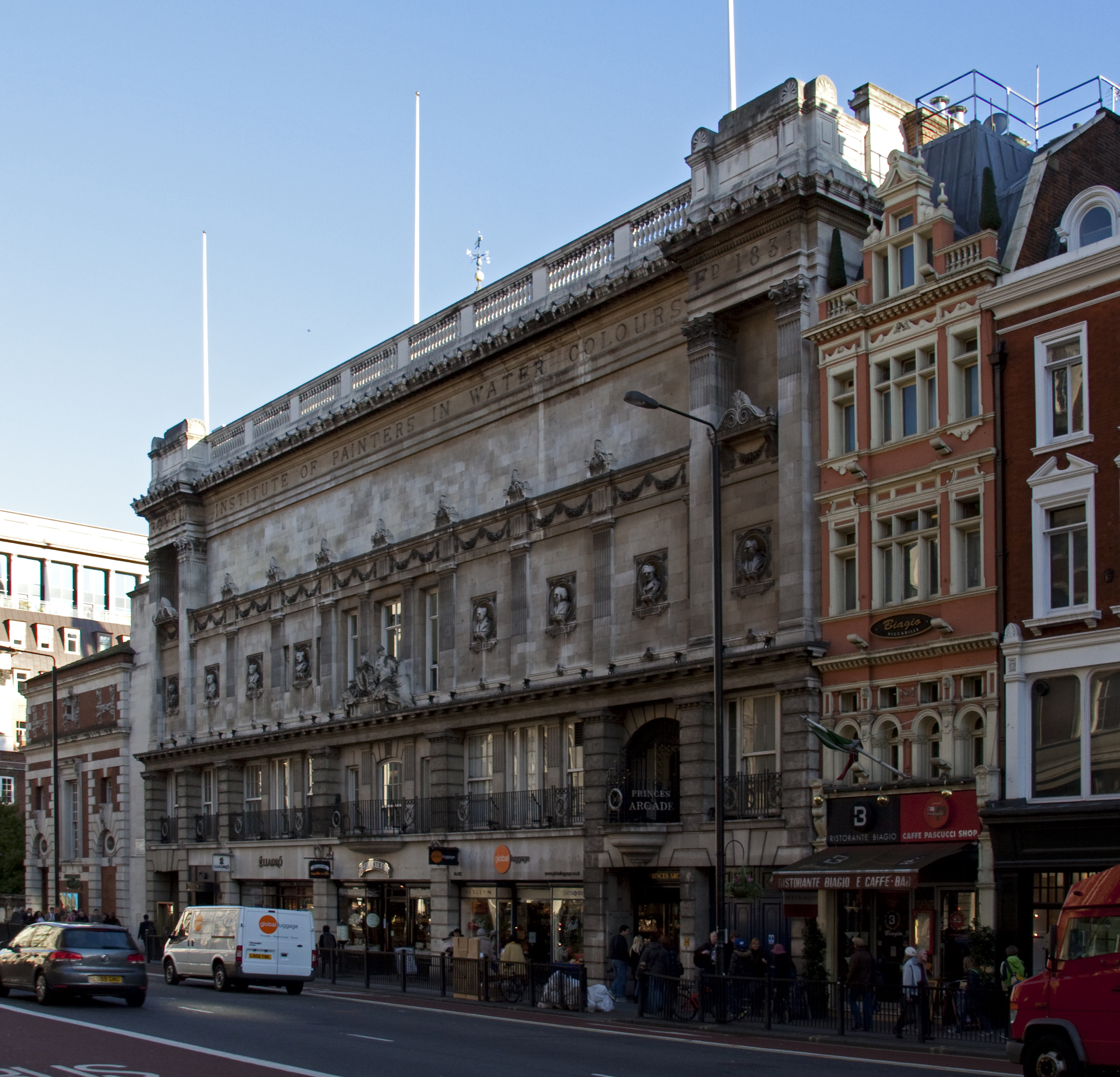
Premises at Picadilly 1883–1970

The Royal Institute of Painters in Water Colours (RI), initially called the New Society of Painters in Water Colours, is one of the societies in the Federation of British Artists, based in the Mall Galleries in London.

== History ==
In 1831, the society was founded as the New Society of Painters in Water Colours, competing with the Royal Watercolour Society (RWS), which had been founded in 1804. The founding members were William Cowen, James Fudge, Thomas Maisey (treasurer), O. F. Phillips, Joseph Powell (president), W. B. S. Taylor, and Thomas Charles Wageman. The New Society differed from the RWS in policy, by exhibiting non-members' work also. Both societies challenged the Royal Academy's refusal to accept the medium of watercolours as appropriate for serious art.

In this period, it is often referred to as just the "New Society", and "NS" or "NSW" was used as a post-nominal for members, who sometimes signed their works with this.

At least initially, the New Society was more open to the extensive use of opaque bodycolour or gouache, while the more conservative RWS tended to deprecate this. However, by the mid-century most painters were using bodycolour, and this ceased to be a major difference. Indeed, by the last decades of the century the RI (as it now was) was home to a group of artists who once again avoided bodycolour. Artists were not supposed to belong to both societies, and there was a trickle of defectors to the RWS, which tended to be regarded as the more prestigious (including David Cox Jr. and Francis William Topham).

In 1888 there were 935 and in 1890 791 pictures in the main annual exhibition, held in the spring.

In 1839, Henry Warren (1794–1879) became president of the society and was re-elected for many years until he resigned due to failing eyesight. In 1863, there was a name change to the Institute of Painters in Water Colours. In 1883, it acquired its own premises at Piccadilly, across the road from the Royal Academy. In 1885, it added "Royal" to its title by command of Queen Victoria. When the lease to the Piccadilly premises ran out in 1970, it moved to the Mall Galleries, near to Trafalgar Square.

=== Royal Institute Galleries ===
The premises at 190–195 Piccadilly hosted many exhibitions by other societies and were known simply as "Royal Institute Galleries". It is now a grade II listed building. Number 195 is now home to BAFTA.

== Notable members ==
- A complete PDF list of members since foundation is on the RI website here.

- Anna Airy
- Mike Bernard
- George Henry Boughton
- Henry Charles Brewer
- Randolph Caldecott
- Thomas Collier
- Princess Patricia of Connaught
- Fanny Corbaux
- David Cox Jr.
- Walter Crane
- Charles Dixon
- Sam Dodwell
- Rose Emma Drummond
- Lionel Edwards
- Bernard Walter Evans
- Emily Farmer
- John Strickland Goodall
- Thomas Cooper Gotch
- Kate Greenaway
- Edward John Gregory (President)
- Louis Haghe
- Martin Hardie
- John Hassall
- Edwin Hayes
- Claude Hayes
- Eleanor Hughes
- Henry Jutsum
- William Knight Keeling
- William Leighton Leitch (Vice-President)
- Sir Coutts Lindsay
- Sir James Linton (President)
- John Seymour Lucas
- Fortunino Matania
- Mortimer Menpes
- Alfred Munnings
- James Orrock
- Alfred Parsons
- Charles Robinson
- Frank O. Salisbury
- Kenneth Shoesmith
- Francis Job Short
- William Simpson
- Lionel Smythe
- Julia Sorrell
- Emily Stannard
- John Tenniel
- Francis William Topham
- Walter Tyndale
- Arthur Wardle
- Edmund George Warren
- John William Waterhouse
- Harrison Weir
- Edward Wesson
- Leslie Arthur Wilcox
- Norman Wilkinson
- Edmund Morison Wimperis (Vice-President)
- William Barnes Wollen
- William Wyld
- John Yardley (painter)

== Honorary members ==
- Sir James C Harris
- Charles III
