= Frank Cundall =

English art historian (1858–1937)

Frank Cundall OBE FSA FRHS
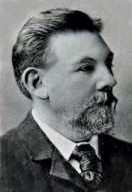
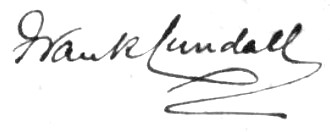
- Frank Cundall
- Born: 17 January 1858; London, England
- Died: 15 November 1937 (aged 79)
- Occupations: Art historian, author, librarian
- Known for: Founded the West India Reference Library
- Father: Joseph Cundall

Frank Cundall OBE FSA FRHS (17 January 1858 – 15 November 1937) was an English art historian, editor and author, who was the son of the writer and publisher Joseph Cundall. He was closely involved in the administration of and produced the reports for a series of international exhibitions held in London in the 1880s, and catalogued the art library at the South Kensington Museum, later the Victoria and Albert Museum.

In 1891, he became the secretary and librarian to the Institute of Jamaica in Kingston, writing extensively on the history of the island. He created the West India Reference Library in 1894, which became the nucleus of the National Library of Jamaica when it was formed in 1979.

== Early life and family ==
Frank Cundall was born in London on 17 January 1858, the son of the writer, photographer, and publisher Joseph Cundall (1818–1895) and his wife Sarah.

After attending private schools, he gained admission to King's College London, leaving in 1875.

He married twice and had a son and a daughter. His son was Joseph Leslie Cundall, who became the Attorney General of Jamaica, and his daughter Frances married Guy Weihen of Munro College, Saint Elizabeth Parish.

== Early career ==
From 1876 to 1882, Cundall was the assistant editor for the revised edition of Bryan's Dictionary of Painters and Engravers (London, George Bell). At the same time from 1877 to 1890 he was the joint editor with his father of the Illustrated Biographies of the Great Artists in 38 volumes (London: Sampson Low) and from 1879 to 1885 wrote anonymously The Great Historic Galleries of England under the editorship of Ronald Gower.

Joseph Cundall was associated with Henry Cole, the first director of the South Kensington Museum, later the Victoria and Albert Museum, and in 1880–82, Frank Cundall was engaged in cataloguing the works of the National Art Library there.

In 1883, he was assistant secretary to the International Fisheries Exhibition, in 1884 to the International Health Exhibition, and in 1885 to the International Inventions Exhibition, and was assistant editor for their catalogues and handbooks. His father had been closely involved in the 1862 International Exhibition. In 1886, he was the editor with Sir Philip Cunliffe-Owen of the report of the Royal Commission of the Colonial and Indian Exhibition. In 1889, he prepared the catalogue, report, and award lists for the British section of the Paris Exposition Universelle, and in 1890 the catalogue and guide for the Royal Military Exhibition.

== Jamaica ==
In 1890, Cundall was appointed secretary and librarian to the Institute of Jamaica. He was able to solicit testimonials in support of his application from a number of people that he came across while working on the exhibitions including Cunliffe-Owen, who had known Cundell from early childhood, Sir Frederick Abel, Sir James Paget and Sir Colville Barclay. He arrived in Kingston in February 1891. He created the West India Reference Library, founded 1894, which formed the nucleus of the National Library of Jamaica when it was created in 1979. Using his knowledge of art and his exhibition experience, he created an art gallery at the Institute for which he published a catalogue of the portraits in 1914.

He was a prolific writer on the history of Jamaica, producing important bibliographies of Jamaica and the wider West Indies. He was joint editor of the Handbook of Jamaica from 1907 and became sole editor from 1920. His masterwork was to be his history of the governors of the colony, however, only the first two volumes were published before his death.

== Honours and later life ==
Cundall was appointed a member of the Order of the British Empire (OBE) in 1929 and was a fellow of the Society of Antiquaries of London (FSA) and of the Royal Historical Society (FRHS).

He died on 15 November 1937.

== Selected publications ==
Cundall's publications include:

=== 1880s ===
- Reminiscences of the Colonial and Indian Exhibition. William Clowes, London, 1886. (Editor)
- D'Anvers, N. The Student's Handbook of Art; An Elementary History of Art. Painting. 3rd edition. Sampson Low, Marston, Searle, and Rivington, London, [1889]. (Revised and expanded)

=== 1890s ===
- The Landscape and Pastoral Painters of Holland: Ruisdael Hobbema Cuijp Potter. London: Sampson Low, Marston, Searle & Rivington, 1891.
- The Story of the Life of Columbus and the Discovery of Jamaica. Kingston, 1894.
- Jamaica in 1895; A Handbook of Information for Intending Settlers and Others (Also 1896, 1897, 1901, 1922, 1928. Title varies)
- Jamaica Cartography: Chronological List of the Maps of Jamaica in the Library of the Institute of Jamaica &c. Institute of Jamaica, Kingston, [1897].

=== 1900s ===
- Studies in Jamaica History. London: Sampson Low, Marston and Co., for the Institute of Jamaica, 1900.
- Bibliographia Jamaicensis; A list of Jamaica books and pamphlets, magazine articles, newspapers, and maps, most of which are in the library of the Institute of Jamaica. Institute of Jamaica, Kingston, 1902. (Supplement, 1908)
- Biographical Annals of Jamaica: A brief history of the colony, arranged as a guide to the Jamaica portrait gallery: with chronological outlines of Jamaica history. Educational Supply Company for the Institute of Jamaica, Kingston, 1904.
- A Brief Guide to an Exhibition of Maps of the Sixteenth Century Illustrative of the Discovery of America. Institute of Jamaica, Kingston, 1906.
- Political and Social Disturbances in the West Indies. A brief account and bibliography. Educational Supply Company for the Institute of Jamaica, Kingston, 1906.
- Lady Nugent's Journal: Jamaica One Hundred Years Ago. A & C Black, London, 1907. (Editor)
- Bibliography of the West Indies (Excluding Jamaica). Institute of Jamaica, Kingston, 1909.
- Jamaica Place-names. Institute of Jamaica, Kingston, 1909.

=== 1910s ===
- Catalogue of the Portraits in the Jamaica History Gallery of the Institute of Jamaica. Institute of Jamaica, Kingston, 1914.
- Historic Jamaica. Institute of Jamaica, London, 1915 (also at Project Gutenberg).
- The Press and Printers of Jamaica Prior to 1820. American Antiquarian Society, Worcester, Mass., 1916.
- "The Migration from Surinam to Jamaica", Timehri: The Journal of the Royal Agricultural and Commercial Society of British Guiana, Vol. VI (third series), September 1919, Colonisation volume, pp. 145–172.

=== 1920s ===
- The Life of Enos Nuttall, Archbishop of the West Indies. Society for Promoting Christian Knowledge, London, 1922.
- Jamaica's Part in the Great War 1914-1918. West India Committee, London, 1925.
- "Tortoiseshell Carving in Jamaica", The Connoisseur, Vol. 72 (1925), pp. 154–65.
- Chronological Outlines of Jamaica History 1492–1926. Institute of Jamaica, Kingston, 1927.
- "The Taxing of the Jews in Jamaica in The Seventeenth Century", Publications of the American Jewish Historical Society, No. 31 (1928), pp. 243–247.
- A Brief account of King's House, Spanish Town, Jamaica. Institute of Jamaica, Kingston, 1929.

=== 1930s ===
- A Brief History of the Parish Church of St. Andrew Jamaica. Institute of Jamaica, Kingston, 1931.
- "A Supplementary Bibliography of Richard Hill", The American Book Collector, Vol. 3, No. 1 (January 1933), pp. 46–48.
- A History of Printing in Jamaica from 1717 to 1834. Institute of Jamaica, Kingston, 1935.
- The Governors of Jamaica in the Seventeenth Century. West India Committee, London, 1936.
- The Governors of Jamaica in the First Half of the Eighteenth Century. West India Committee, London, 1937.
