= C. Washington Eves =

Merchant in the UK-West Indies trade

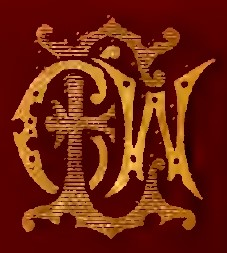
- C. Washington Eves' monogram
- Born: Charles Washington Augero Eves; 13 September 1838; Newington, London
- Died: 20 April 1899; Highbury, London
- Occupation: Merchant with the West Indies
- Known for: Promotion of the products of Jamaica
- Spouse: Annie
- Children: 5

Charles Washington Augero Eves, CMG, (13 September 1838 – 20 April 1899) was a British merchant prominent in the trade between London and the West Indies, and a promoter of the products of Jamaica. He was the honorary commissioner for Jamaica at the Colonial and Indian Exhibition in London, 1886, and was appointed by the Secretary of State for the Colonies to represent Jamaica at the Colonial Conference of 1887.

== Early life and family ==
Eves was born in 1838 and educated in London, Saint-Omer, and Bonn. He was resident in Jamaica during his early life and later in north London. He married Annie and had four daughters and a son, Major Edward Hubert Egerton Eves, RMLI.

== Career ==
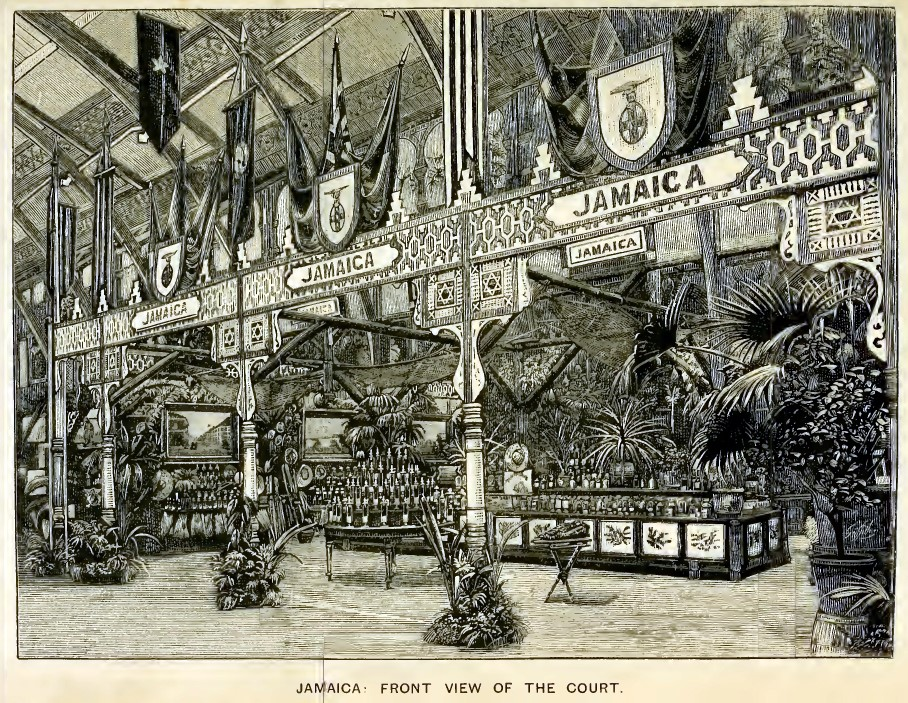
Jamaica's display at the Colonial and Indian Exhibition, London, 1886

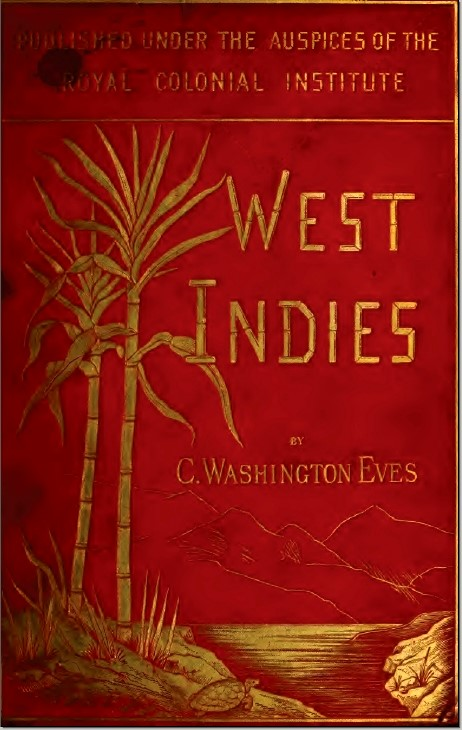
The West Indies by C. Washington Eves, 1889

Eves was in business with Edward Reinach at 1 Fen Court, in the City of London, in the business of import-export and general merchants, trading as C.W. Eves and Co., until 30 July 1887 when their partnership was dissolved.

He was closely involved in the trade between London and the West Indies, in particular with Jamaica, and was the honorary commissioner for Jamaica at the Colonial and Indian Exhibition in London, 1886. He was appointed by the Secretary of State for the Colonies to represent Jamaica at the Colonial Conference of 1887 and he was chairman of the London committee of the Jamaica International Exhibition of 1891 which was modelled on the Great Exhibition of 1851. He was a member of the council of the Royal Colonial Institute.

He became a member of the Society of Arts in 1887 and was also a fellow of the Royal Geographical Society. He was appointed a companion of the Order of St Michael and St George in 1890 for "services rendered in connection with the Island of Jamaica" which was seen as a reward for his work on the Colonial and Indian Exhibition. In March 1890 he was made Honorary Colonel of the 6th Middlesex (St. George's) Corps.

== Writing ==
Eves wrote the introduction to the Jamaica handbook for the Colonial and Indian Exhibition and for Jamaica's participation in the Royal Jubilee Exhibition, Liverpool, of 1887. The remaining text of the later work being made up of official statistics, lists of exhibitors and their goods, and material drawn from the Handbook of Jamaica by A.C. Sinclair of the Government Printing Establishment in Jamaica and Laurence R. Fyfe of the Colonial Secretary's Office.

In 1889, he produced The West Indies which was published under the auspices of The Royal Colonial Institute and combined history, travel advice, and discussion of the general state of the principal islands of the West Indies.

== Death ==
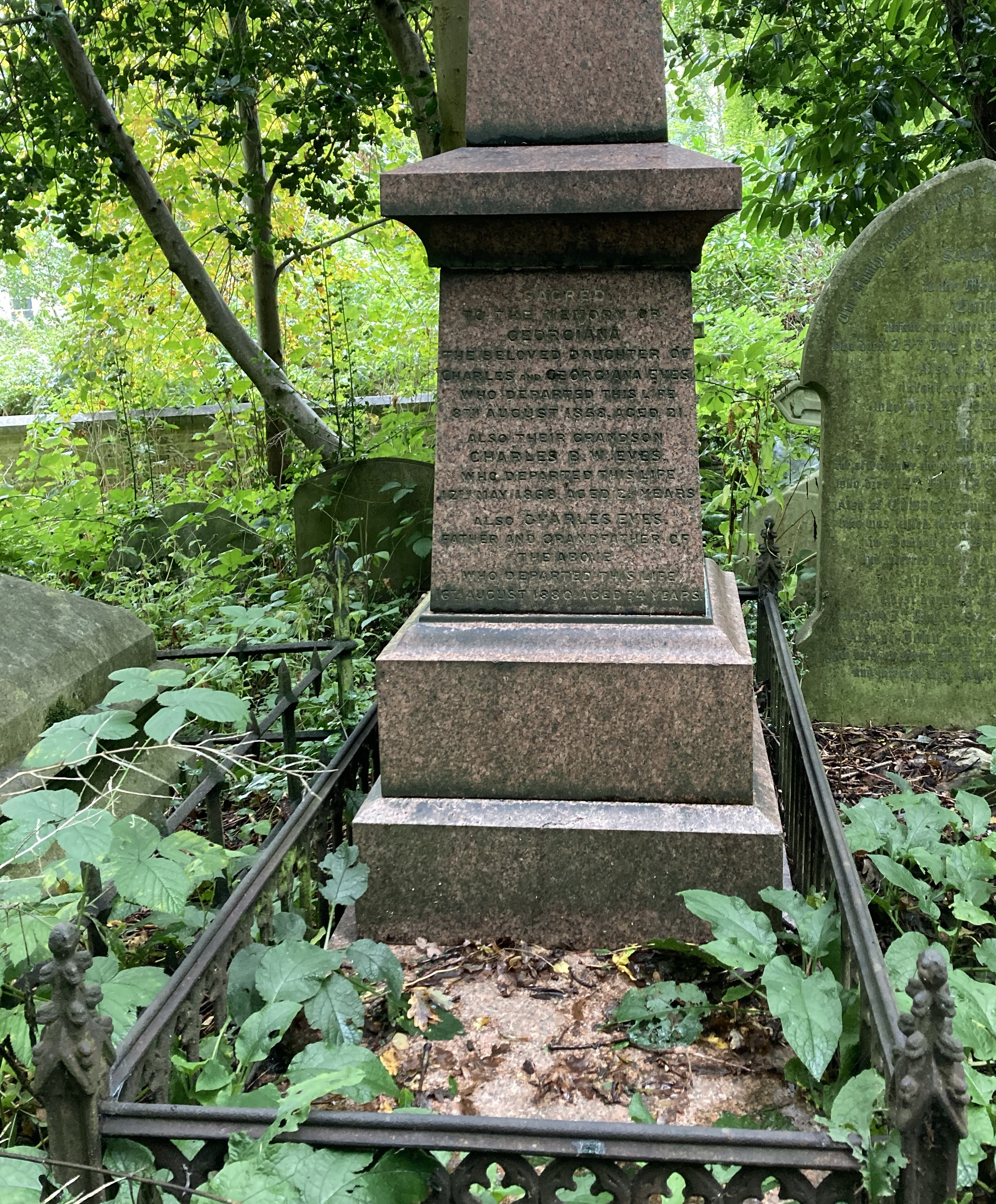
Family grave of Charles Washington Augero Eves in Highgate Cemetery

Eves died suddenly at his home of Trelawny House, 49 Highbury New Park, London, on the 20 April 1899. An inquest was held into the death by Dr. Danford Thomas a few days later at Holloway Road. According to evidence given, early on Thursday morning Eves went into the basement of his home to repair some electric burglar alarm bells. After he did not immediately return, Edward Moorhead, a ship-owner of Cardiff and Eves' son-in-law, went to investigate and found Eves unconscious at the bottom of the staircase with a head injury. A doctor attended but Eves died within hours from "compression of blood on the brain, coupled with concussion". A verdict of accidental death was recorded.

He was survived by his wife, son, and four daughters and was buried on the western side of Highgate Cemetery on 24 April 1899. The funeral was attended by Colonel Bird and the whole of the officers of the Victoria and St George's Rifles (1st Middlesex) who formed a guard of honour. His executors were fellow West Indian merchant Joseph Frank Alderhoven, and major James Rufus Boosé. All three were members of the Royal Colonial Institute.

== Selected publications ==
- Jamaica at the Colonial and Indian Exhibition, London, 1886. Spottiswoode, London, 1886. (includes a reprinting of The Jamaica Court at the Indian and Colonial Exhibition: Handbook compiled for the Governors of the Jamaica Institute by A.C. Sinclair and Laurence R. Fyfe)
- Jamaica at the Royal Jubilee Exhibition Liverpool 1887. Spottiswoode, London, 1887.
- The West Indies. Sampson Low, Marston, Searle & Rivington, London, 1889. (2nd 1891)
