= Great Artist =

Great Artist may refer to:

- A Great Artist, a 2003 album by A Life Once Lost
- The Great Artist, a 2020 short film by Indrani Pal-Chaudhuri
- The Great Artiste, a USAAF WWII B-29 Superfortress bomber
- Illustrated Biographies of the Great Artists or The Great Artists, a 19th-century book series

== See also ==
- Blush: The Search for the Next Great Makeup Artist, a 2008 competition show on Lifetime
- Work of Art: The Next Great Artist, a 2010 competition show on Bravo
