= RHS Garden, Kensington =

Former garden in South Kensington, London

Coordinates: 51.500172°N 0.177257°W

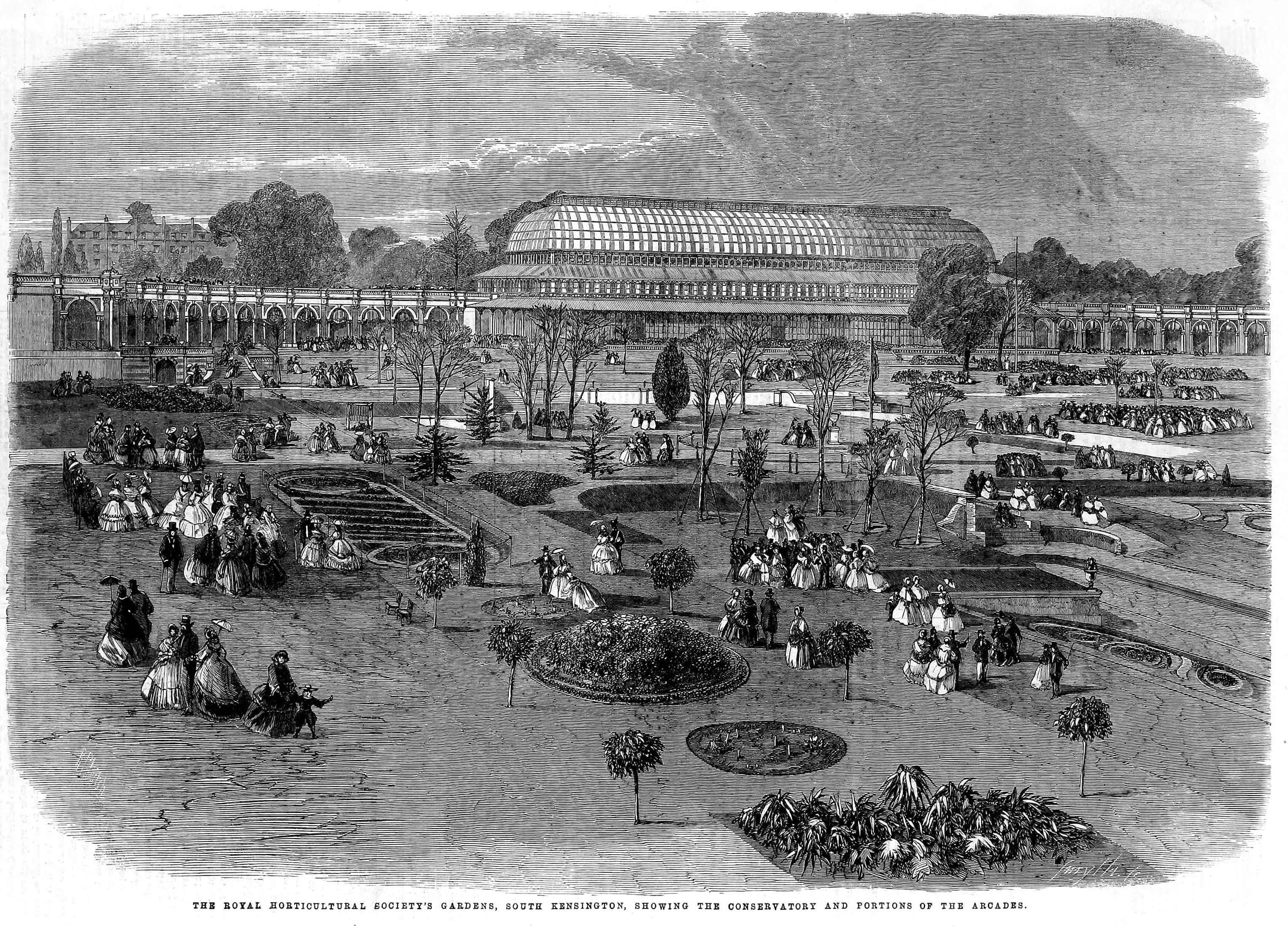
A view of the garden's conservatory.

The Royal Horticultural Society Garden was a garden operated by the Royal Horticultural Society (RHS) in South Kensington in London. The garden was opened in 1861 and would remain until 1888, when the land would be developed into residential blocks as well as institutions such as the Science Museum and Imperial College.

== History ==
=== Prince Albert ===
The garden's existence was largely made possible by the efforts of Prince Albert. Acting as president of the RHS, his influence would help to acquire a lease from the commissioners of the Great Exhibition, and he would open the garden in 1861 in his last public appearance. Queen Victoria would write of the garden in her journal:

"dear Albert has taken such immense pains in directing & laying out... The Colonnades are beautiful, the beds & "parterres" are already being laid out & when finished will be most charming, so enjoyable for summer & the colonnades practical in damp or wet weather"

The garden would occupy a plot at the centre of what would come to be known as "Albertopolis", due to his role in the development of much of the land and the institutions present in the area.

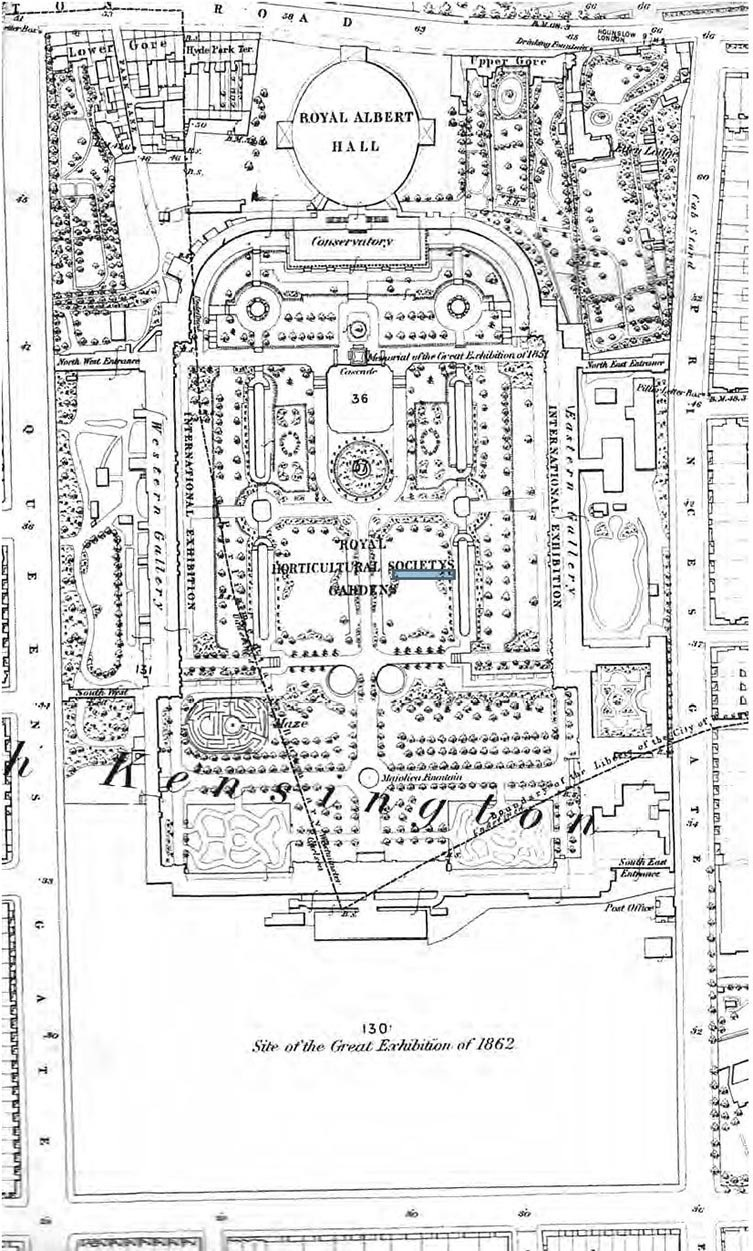
Ordnance Survey map of the area in 1871, the site of the 1862 Exhibition is also labelled.

=== Exhibitions ===
The garden would also feature in or host a number of exhibitions including the International Exhibition, Annual International Exhibition (1871–1874), International Fisheries Exhibition (1883), International Health Exhibition (1884), and Colonial and Indian Exhibition (1886).

=== Decline ===
The garden would face a number of challenges following the death of Prince Albert shortly after its opening. With development of surrounding areas by the Commissioners of the Great Exhibition, pressure would mount and the garden would struggle to meet its obligations. Disputes would also arise in the 1870s over public access, management and future development. The commissioners would manage to regain control of the site around 1888, and the state of dilapidation facing the garden in the latter years of its existence was said, by Henry Cole, who had managed development of the garden, to reflect the state of the finances of the RHS.

The garden would be replaced by educational institutions such as Imperial College, as well as residential buildings to the north and west, such as the mansion block Albert Court.

== Design ==
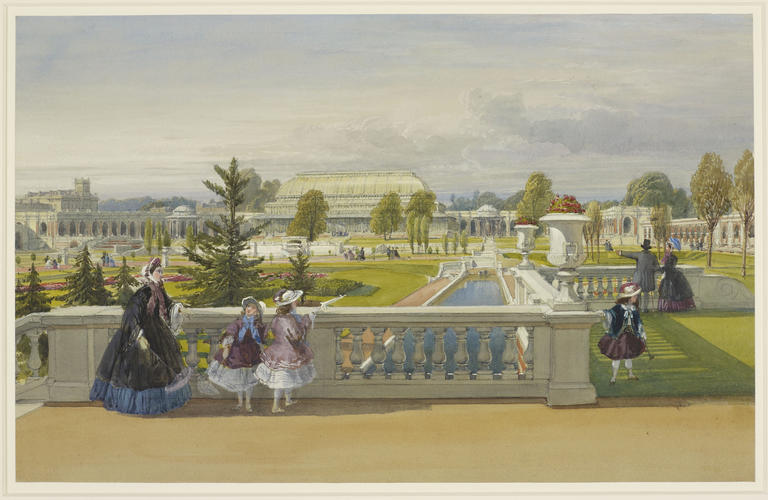
A contemporary painting of the gardens by William Leighton Leitch (1861)

The garden would be surrounded by a number of arcades covering much of its perimeter. At the northern end, they formed a crescent with the grand conservatory at its centre. The arcades were Italianate in design, likely inspired by the cloisters of St John the Lateran and the gardens of the Villa Albani in Rome. The architecture as well as the overall landscape and gardening would give it the style of the Italian Garden.

Other notable features were artificial canals and pools running through the garden, sculptures and statuary, as well as patterns of coloured gravel.

Involved in the design were Sydney Smirke and Francis Fowke who would design the conservatory and arcades, William Andrews Nesfield who would design much of the landscaping, as well as terracotta detailing by Godfrey Sykes.

== See also ==
- Royal Horticultural Society
- Albertopolis
- Great Exhibition
