= The Great Historic Galleries of England =

1880 book

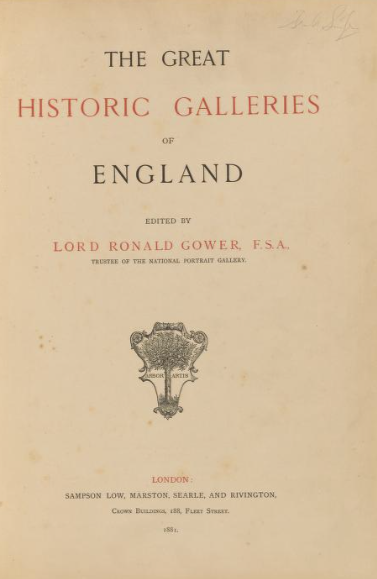
- Title page for The Great Historic Galleries of England (1881)
- Editor: Ronald Gower
- Publisher: Sampson Low, Marston, Searle, and Rivington
- Publication date: 1880-85 (5 vols.)

The Great Historic Galleries of England is a book describing the "most interesting" paintings and miniatures in the galleries of England. It was edited by Ronald Gower, written anonymously by Frank Cundall, and published by Sampson Low, Marston, Searle, and Rivington in London from 1880 to 1885 in five volumes.

The book takes the form of a description with provenance of each work together with a photographic image. The works themselves were selected from the collections of the English nobility at their private homes such as Castle Howard, Hertford House (now home to the Wallace Collection), and Stafford House, rather than from public art galleries.

The Graphic reported that it was published in monthly parts with a de-luxe edition that used a new method printing that avoided "mounting". The Times was generally positive about the book, appreciating Gower's treatment of the miniatures and that some of the works he selected were relatively unknown and that he did not always accept the established attributions of works, but wished for a more detailed text in some cases. The Athenaeum approved of the editor's selection of works and also noted the presence of the miniatures.

== Collected volume ==
- The Great Historic Galleries of England. Sampson Low, Marston, Searle, and Rivington, London, 1881–85.

== See also ==
- Illustrated Biographies of the Great Artists
