= Augustus Constantine Sinclair =

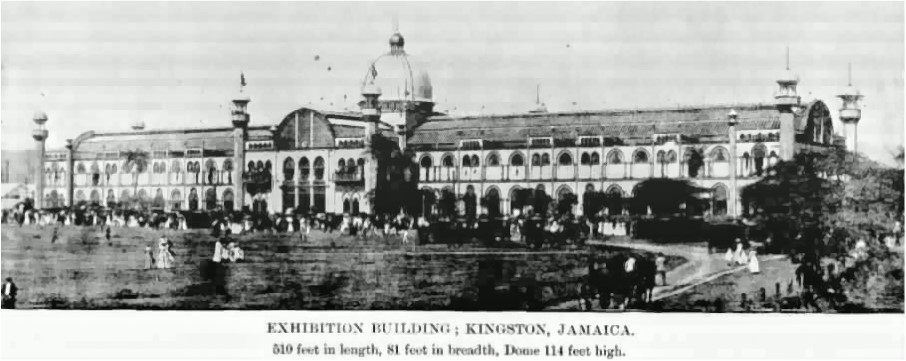
The Jamaica International Exhibition building.

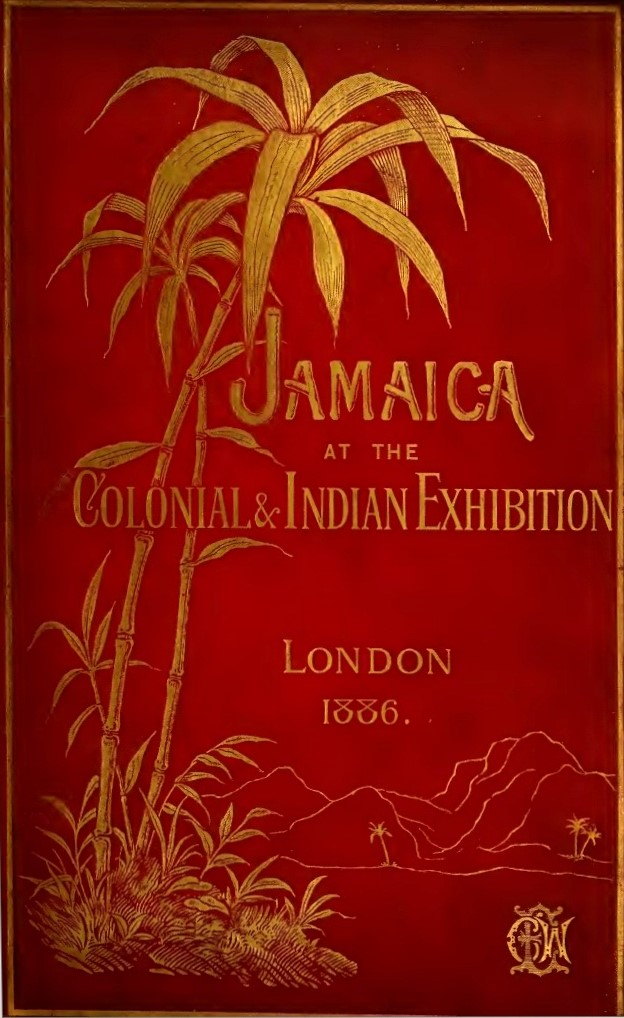
Jamaica at the Colonial and Indian Exhibition, London, 1886, by C. Washington Eves which reprinted Sinclair and Fyfe's report on the Jamaican exhibits.

Augustus Constantine Sinclair (c. 1834 – 27 January 1891) was the head of the Government Printing Office in Jamaica in the nineteenth century and the compiler with Laurence R. Fyfe of the annual Handbook of Jamaica, first published in 1881. He is credited with the idea of the Jamaica International Exhibition of 1891 but died on its opening day.

== Early life and family ==
Augustus Sinclair was born in Jamaica around 1834. He was christened at St. Catherine's, Middlesex, Jamaica, on 31 December 1834. He married Catherine Ann Rosetta Graham in 1886 and they had a daughter, Amy Louise Graham Sinclair, born 1888, and a son, Cyril Augustus Graham Sinclair, born in 1890.

== Career ==
As head of the Government Printing Office, Sinclair was responsible for printing government publications, including the proceedings of the Jamaican Parliament. He was also the joint compiler with Laurence R. Fyfe of the Colonial Secretary's Office, of the first editions of the long-running Handbook of Jamaica, from 1881.

Also with Fyfe, he wrote Jamaica: Outlines of its Geography and History for schools (1883, at least five later editions) and prepared a report of the Jamaican exhibits at the Colonial and Indian Exhibition of 1886 for the governors of the Jamaica Institute which was reprinted and bound into C. Washington Eves' own account of the exhibits. In 1889, Sinclair and Fyfe produced a history of Jamaica during the governorship of Sir Henry Wylie Norman (1883–89) which, typically of their historical works, concentrated on chronology and fact-based material rather than analysis.

== Jamaica International Exhibition ==
Sinclair is credited with the idea of the Jamaica International Exhibition of 1891 which he based on the 1851 Great Exhibition in London. For many years he was unable to drum up sufficient support for his project for a Jamaican equivalent, but in 1889 Sir Henry Blake arrived as the new governor of Jamaica and gave the idea his blessing. It opened less than two years later.

== Death ==
Sinclair died, aged 58, at 106 King Street, Kingston, on 27 January 1891, on the day of the opening of the Jamaica International Exhibition. The cause of death was stated to be disease of the heart and liver.

== Selected publications ==
- Jamaica: Outlines of its Geography and History. Kingston, 1883. (With Laurence R. Fyfe) (4th, 1888, 5th 1890)
- The Jamaica Court at the Indian and Colonial Exhibition: Handbook compiled for the Governors of the Jamaica Institute. Jamaica, 1886. (With Laurence R. Fyfe) (Reprinted and bound into C. Washington Eves' Jamaica at the Colonial and Indian Exhibition, London, 1886, Spottiswoode, London, 1886.)
- A Chronological history of Jamaica during the government of His Excellency Sir Henry Wylie Norman. Government Printing Establishment, Jamaica, 1889. (With Laurence R. Fyfe)
