= Laurence R. Fyfe =

British civil servant in colonial Jamaica

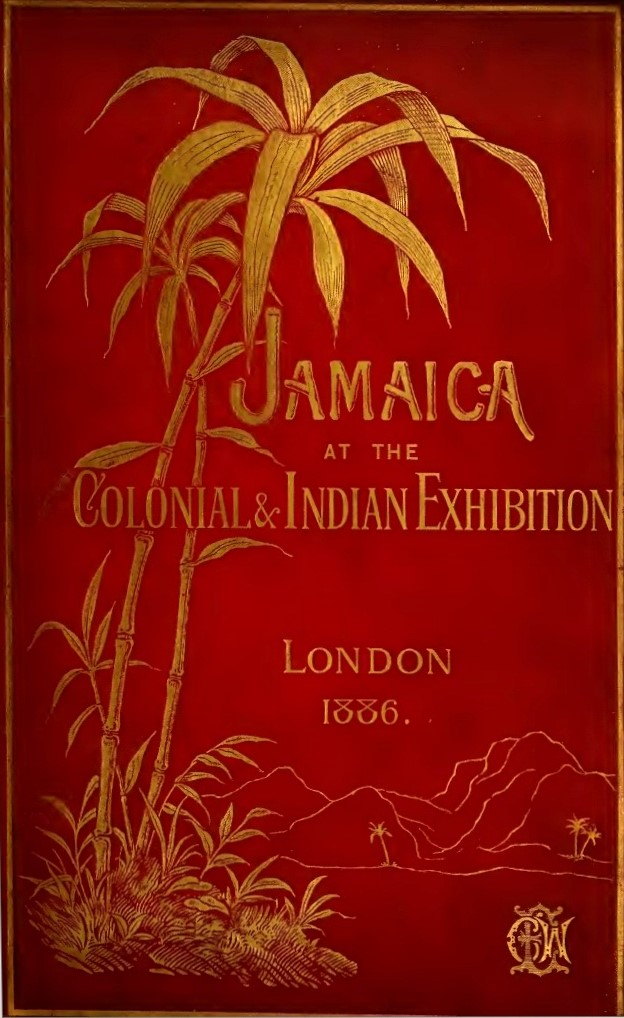
Jamaica at the Colonial and Indian Exhibition, London, 1886, by C. Washington Eves which reprinted Fyfe and Sinclair's report on the Jamaican exhibits.

Lawrence Dalzelle Riky Fyfe (4 August 1845 – 9 May 1892) was a British civil servant in the Colonial Secretary's Office in Jamaica who, with Augustus Constantine Sinclair, compiled the annual Handbook of Jamaica, first published in 1881. Together they also produced a number of other works relating to the island of Jamaica.

== Early life and family ==
Laurence Fyfe was born in Jamaica to Charles Fyfe and Jane Hussey Fyfe, who married in Barony, Lanarkshire, Scotland, in 1837. His father was born in Jamaica in 1810, the son of Lawrence Fyfe, likely a Scottish migrant to Jamaica; while his mother was baptised in Tunbridge Wells, Kent, England in 1819. Fyfe was educated at the Collegiate School, Jamaica; Dr. Ridgway's School, Exeter; Monsieur Boquets Pension Anderlecht, near Brussels; and at the University of Aberdeen.

He married Francis (Fanny or Fannie) Ann Colthirst and they had a son, Laurence Charles Colthirst Fyfe, at Altries Cottage, Kingston, on 4 November 1877, and another on 11 September 1879.

== Career ==
Fyfe appears to have started his civil service career as a second-class clerk in the Colonial Secretary's Office. By 1878 he was a first class clerk. He progressed rapidly and in 1885 was appointed by the Governor of Jamaica to be secretary to a commission to report into the system of elementary education on the island.

In January 1890, he was appointed Colonial Secretary of Grenada.

== Writing ==
Fyfe was the joint compiler with Augustus Constantine Sinclair (died 1891), head of the Government Printing Office, of the first editions of the long-running Handbook of Jamaica, from 1881. They also wrote Jamaica: Outlines of its Geography and History for schools (1883, at least five later editions) and prepared a report of the Jamaican exhibits at the Colonial and Indian Exhibition of 1886 for the governors of the Jamaica Institute which was reprinted and bound into C. Washington Eves' own account of the exhibits. In 1889 they produced a history of Jamaica during the governorship of Sir Henry Wylie Norman (1883–89) which, typically of their historical work, concentrated on chronology and fact-based accounts rather than analysis.

== Death ==
Fyfe died on 9 May 1892, aged 46. His address was 30 Eastbourne Terrace, Middlesex. Administration of his estate was granted in London to his wife, Fannie. He left effects of £409.

== Selected publications ==
- Jamaica: Outlines of its Geography and History. Kingston, 1883. (With Augustus Constantine Sinclair) (4th, 1888, 5th 1890)
- The Jamaica Court at the Indian and Colonial Exhibition: Handbook compiled for the Governors of the Jamaica Institute. Jamaica, 1886. (With Augustus Constantine Sinclair) (Reprinted and bound into C. Washington Eves' Jamaica at the Colonial and Indian Exhibition, London, 1886, Spottiswoode, London, 1886.)
- A Chronological history of Jamaica during the government of His Excellency Sir Henry Wylie Norman. Government Printing Establishment, Jamaica, 1889. (With Augustus Constantine Sinclair)
