= Joseph Leslie Cundall =

Attorney General of Jamaica

Joseph Leslie Cundall, also Cundal, was the Attorney General of Jamaica.

He was the son of the English migrant to Jamaica, Frank Cundall.
