= International Fisheries Exhibition =

Coordinates: 51.497963°N 0.176932°W

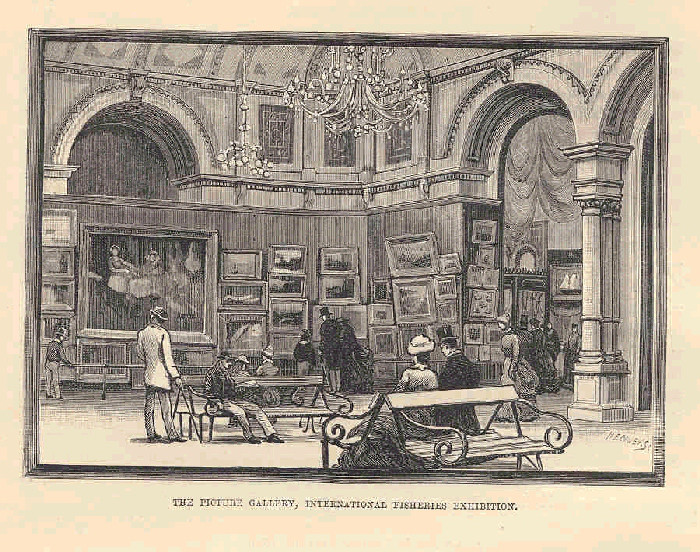
- Picture Gallery

Overview
- BIE-class: Unrecognized exposition
- Name: International Fisheries Exhibition
- Area: 21 acres (0.085 km^{2})
- Visitors: 2.6 million
- Organized by: Frank Cundall (Assitannt secretary)

Participant(s)
- Countries: 31 (countries and colonies)

Location
- Country: United Kingdom
- City: South Kensington, London
- Venue: Royal Horticultural Society Garden in South Kensington

Timeline
- Opening: 12 May 1883
- Closure: 31 October 1883

The International Fisheries Exhibition was a Victorian era scientific, cultural, and animal exhibition open in South Kensington, London, United Kingdom, between May 12 and October 31, 1883. (The busiest day was May 15, when the official visitor count was over 25,000.) One of many world's fairs that took place in the second half of the nineteenth century, the exhibition was the largest special event held in the world to that point, attracting 2.6 million visitors, an average of 18,545 per day. The grounds of the exhibition encompassed 21 acres (0.085 km^{2}) of the Royal Horticultural Society grounds in South Kensington, site of the 1862 International Exhibition. Many of the exhibitions on display were based upon the Buckland Museum of Economic Fish Culture, a private collection at South Kensington, and were expanded upon by exhibits from thirty-one countries and colonies. The exhibition attracted attention not only for the variety of fish species and fishing equipment on display, but also for technological achievements such as the widespread use of electric lighting.

== Overview ==
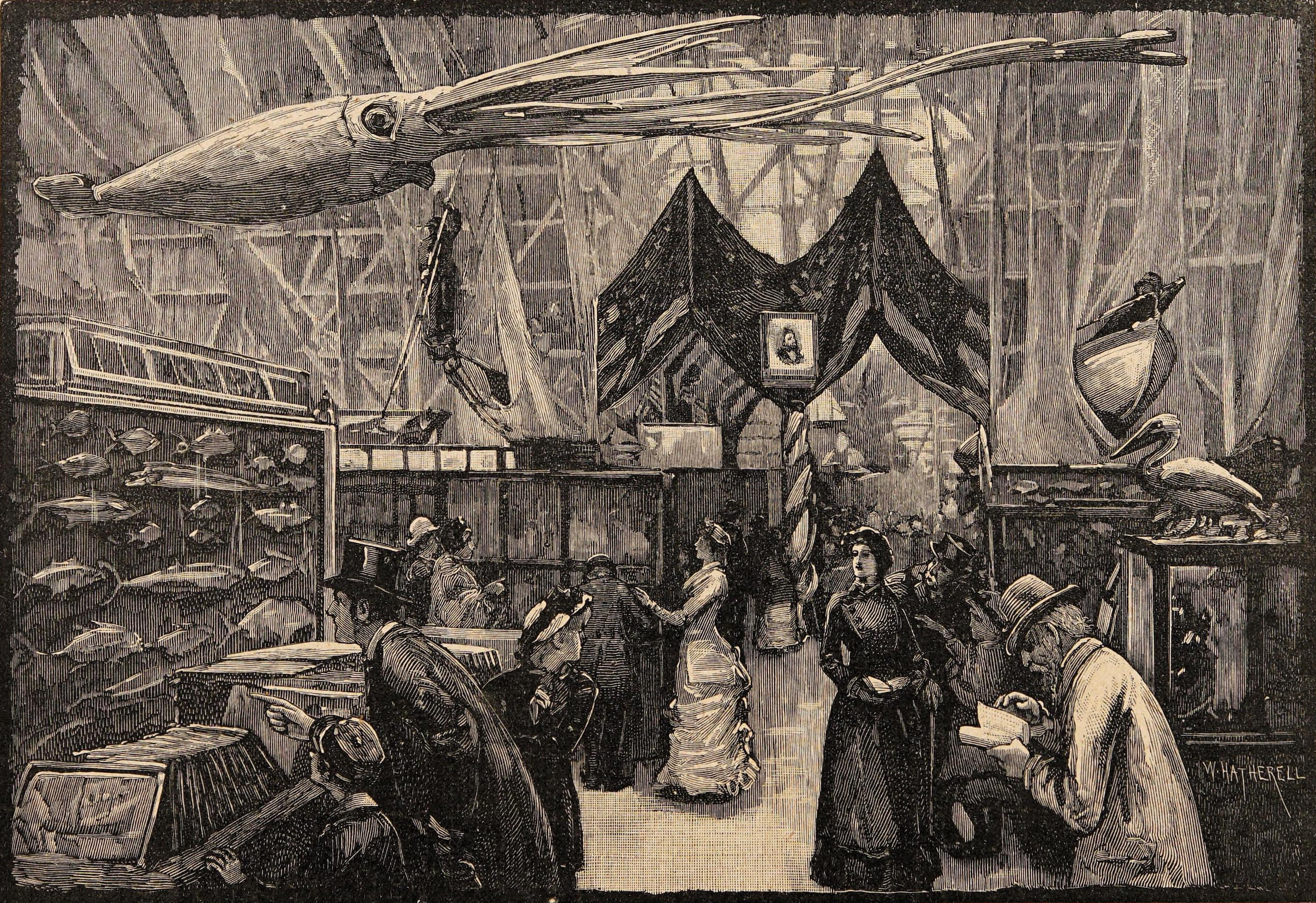
The United States display at the International Fisheries Exhibition

The exhibition had its own Literary Department (interchangeably called the Literary Committee), tasked with documenting, compiling, and publishing the proceedings of the exhibition and also commissioning handbooks especially for the exhibition which would be made available at different stages over the six months. The committee employed William Clowes and Sons to publish the exhibition literature in fourteen volumes, which included eighteen one-shilling handbooks by "authorities of distinction"; forty-nine conference papers, thirty-one prize essays, the official catalogue, the opening and closing ceremony addresses, a "special report" on the electric lighting, and analytical indices. Each national delegation (and many of the private exhibitors) also published their own catalogues.

Queen Victoria herself was patron, though she was unable to attend the opening ceremony due to an accident, so the Prince of Wales took her place and served as President of the Exhibition as well. At the Opening Ceremony the Prince and Princess were surrounded "four hundred representative fishermen from all parts of the kingdom, costumed in their jerseys and sou’westers, their overalls and sea-boots, precisely as they would be when daring the perils of the deep."

The exhibition aquarium was the largest ever constructed, containing 65,000 gallons of water, and the aquarium building formed the entire eastern boundary of the grounds with ten large saltwater tanks and nine large freshwater tanks, plus a further twenty smaller tanks all filled with seawater. All seawater for the exhibition came from Brighton. In addition to fish there was also an aviary of flamingos, pelicans, cormorants, and other fish-eating birds; a pond of otters; seals; reptiles; and a troupe of Canadian beavers in the courtyard near the West Gallery.

== Participants ==
Participating delegations

- Bahamas
- Belgium
- (United Kingdom) British Isles
- Canada
- Ceylon
- China
- Denmark
- France
- Germany
- Greece
- (United Kingdom) Heligoland
- (British Raj) India
- Italy
- Japan
- Netherlands
- Newfoundland
- New South Wales
- Norway
- Portugal
- Russia
- Spain
- Straits Settlements
- Sweden
- Tasmania
- United States

== See also ==
- International Health Exhibition 1884
- International Inventions Exhibition 1885
