= Captain Thomas Honywood =

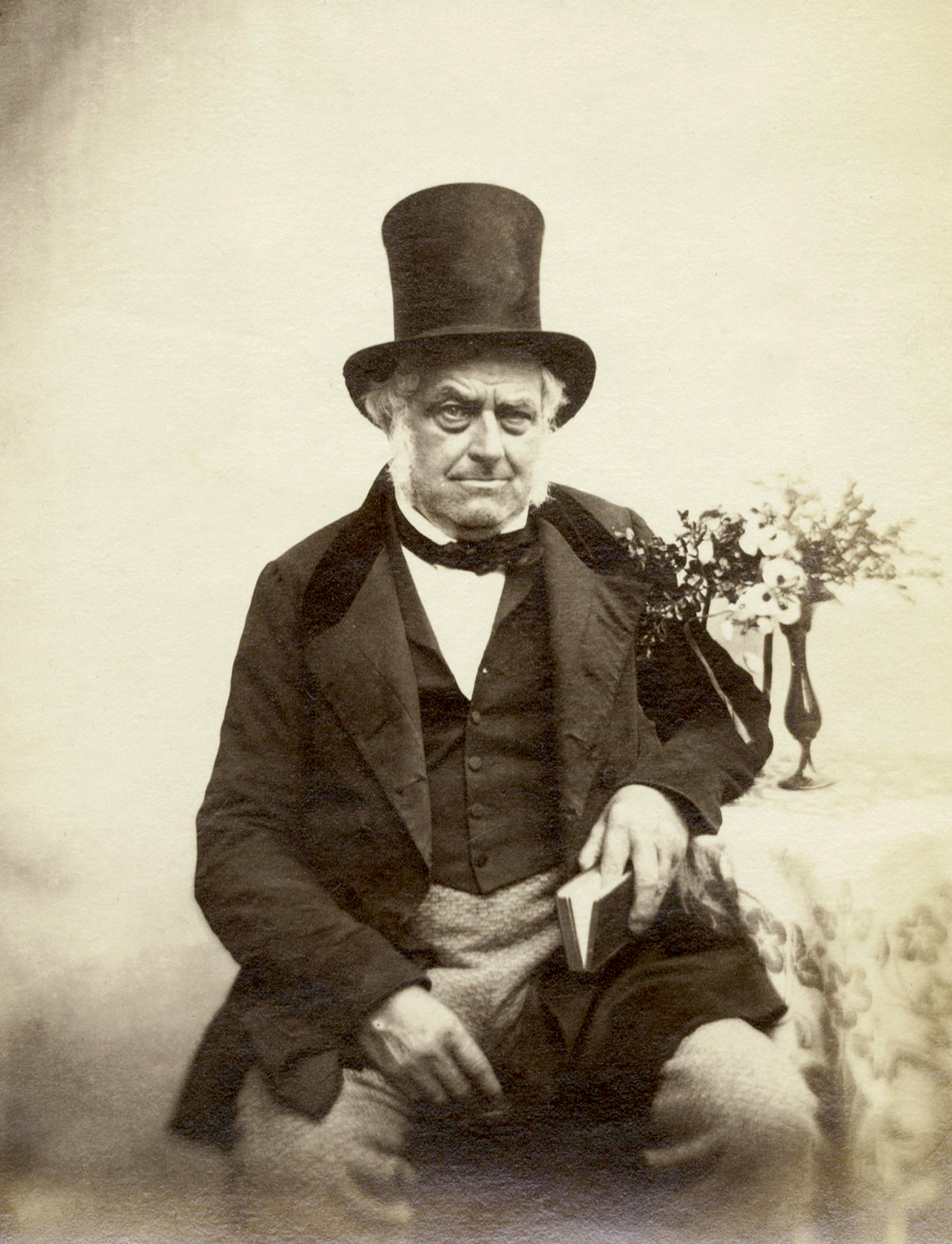
Self-portrait, circa 1854.

Thomas Honywood (7 October 1819 – 5 October 1888) was an English archaeologist and photographer.

== Biography ==
Honywood was born at Horsham on 7 October 1819, the son of Mary Anne Morth and John Honywood (1790–1866), a carpenter, builder and surveyor. He was Horsham's most eminent Victorian.

He is said to have brought photography to Horsham and invented a new photographic process for nature printing. He drew detailed sketches of Horsham Gaol before it was pulled down. He is credited with identifying the Mesolithic or middle Stone age period. He discovered and preserved the Horsham Hoard of medieval pottery. He was an entrepreneur who set up his own museum.

Honywood was Captain of the Horsham Volunteer Fire Brigade for which he received a handsome oil painting. This oil on canvas painting by British painter Robert Wallace Martin (1843–1923), painted in 1869, can be seen in the library of Horsham Museum in Horsham, West Sussex. Honywood is shown in his uniform as a Captain in the Horsham Volunteer Fire Brigade. This portrait was presented by the townspeople in recognition of his services to the Brigade.

The 1860s and 1870s saw him explore a number of archaeological sites including excavating barrows between Cocking and Bignor Hill. In 1878 Thomas married, lived in Courtenay House and had a son Thomas Courtenay de Honywood and a daughter Mabilia before he died in 1888. In the 1880s, Thomas Honywood was perfecting his technique of "Nature Printing". Honywood had been experimenting with photo-chemical printing processes which could transfer the images of ferns, flowers, leaves and even snowflakes onto a variety of surfaces. Eventually, Honywood patented his "Nature Printing" process for "producing designs direct from natural objects on all kinds of Fabrics, Pottery, Dados, Panelling, &c, &c". Three years before his death Thomas exhibited his unique photographic printing method at the International Inventions Exhibition held in London in 1885.

Honywood took an early interest in photography and is thought to have taken the earliest known photographs in Horsham.

== Thomas Honywood's Museum ==
In October 1887 Honywood held a sale of goods and chattels at his house. A rare copy of the sale particulars came to light in 2000, which although missing a couple of pages, shows the house was being stripped, including some of his collections, which he had thought of as a museum. Items included lots:

- No 38 "Massive carved oak coin cabinet fitted with 12 drawers with divisions.
- No 51 Set of 5 very valuable beautifully carved soapstone mantel ornaments, direct from China.
- No 60 Valuable oil painting "Mrs Siddons," by "Martin"
- No 61. Ditto, "Snowdon," by Morris.
- No 67 Two cases of English and foreign birds,
- No 68 Pair of imitation Wedgwood vases.
- No 70 Two stuffed birds under glass domes.
- No 72 Five Chinese pictures."

Followed by a section noted as "Collection of Antique China, Antiquities and Curiosities, Etc" which included a number of Chinese items, "Antique" cups teapot and bowls, as well as lot no's

- No 99 An exchequer tally (very rare) and leather bag containing very old buttons,
- No 100 Three cases of British birds' eggs, including some very rare specimens.
- No 115 Quantity of coral,
- No 117 case of bullets used during the time the Barracks were at Horsham, picked up in Denne Park, and catalogue of sale The Old Barracks
- No 119 Two Indian earthenware bottles (very old).
- No 130 two carved bills of an albatross, on stand, and 3 whale's teeth" as well as the whale teeth outside he also had a "whale's jaw".
