= Lucy Baxter =

Lucy Emily Baxter (21 January 1837 – 10 November 1902) was an English writer on art, chiefly under the pseudonym of Leader Scott.

She was born at Dorchester, the third daughter of William Barnes, the Dorsetshire poet, by his wife Julia Miles. She began writing at eighteen, and from the small profits of stories and magazine articles saved enough to visit Italy, a cherished ambition. There she met and in 1867 married Samuel Thomas Baxter (1810–1903), a member of a family long settled in Florence, which then became her home. For thirty-five years she was a well-known figure in the literary and artistic life of the city, and in 1882 was elected an honorary member of the Accademia delle Belle Arti. For thirteen years her residence was the Villa Bianca, outside Florence, in the direction of Vincigliata (near Fiesole) and Settignano. Among those with whom she was associated in literary research was John Temple Leader, a wealthy English resident at Florence, who owned the castle of Vincigliata. Her literary pseudonym of 'Leader Scott' combined the maiden surnames of her two grandmothers, Isabel Leader being her mother's mother and Grace Scott the mother of her father.

Her principal publication was The Cathedral Builders (1899 and 1900), an important examination of the whole field of Romanesque architecture in relation to the Comacine masons. Her biographer for the DNB observed that:

though necessarily based on Merzario's I Maestri Comacini, the book shows much original observation and research and, if its arguments are not always conclusive, the international scope of the work and its wealth of illustration render it a storehouse of information and a useful introduction to an unfrequented field of speculation. The intention of the work was to attribute the entire genesis of mediaeval architecture to masonic guilds derived, so it is supposed, from the Roman Collegia.

Apart from this work and numerous magazine articles, she published:

- A Nook in the Apennines, 1879.
- Fra Bartolommeo, Albertinelli, and Andrea del Sarto, 1881 (for the series Illustrated Biographies of the Great Artists).
- Ghiberti and Donatello, 1882
- Luca della Robbia, 1883
- Messer Agnolo’s Household, 1883.
- Renaissance of Art in Italy, 1883
- A Bunch of Berries, Bungay, 1885
- Sculpture, Renaissance and Modern, 1886
- Life of William Barnes, 1887
- Tuscan Studies and Sketches, 1887
- Vincigliata and Maiano, Florence and London, 1891
- The Orti Oricellari, Florence, 1893
- Echoes of Old Florence, Florence and London, 1894
- The Castle of Vincigliata, Florence, 1897
- The Renunciation of Helen, 1898
- Filippo di Ser Brunellesco, 1901
- Correggio, 1902.

She translated from Italian:

- Sir John Hawkwood by John Temple Leader and G. Marcotti (1889).

Baxter died at the Villa Bianca near Florence on 10 November 1902.
