= James Rufus Boosé =

James Rufus Boosé

James Rufus Charles Boosé CMG VD (1859 – 19 April 1936) was the librarian, secretary, and finally, travelling commissioner, of the Royal Colonial Institute. He prepared a catalogue of the institute's library as part of its mission to promote British colonialism. He was a captain and honorary major in the 1st Middlesex (Victoria and St George's) Rifles.

== Early life and family ==
James Boosé was born in London or Windsor in 1859. His mother was Fanny J. Boosé. He married Ada A. at St. George Hanover Square, London, in 1884. They had children Ernest J.H. Boosé, Lila G. Boosé, V. Gladys Boosé, and Esme A. Boosé. His wife Ada died in 1911.

== Career ==
Boosé was first librarian, then secretary, and finally, travelling commissioner of the Royal Colonial Institute (now the Royal Commonwealth Society). The development of the Institute's library played an important part in its mission to promote British colonialism and as librarian, Boosé was naturally instrumental in its structuring and expansion. His catalogue of the library was published in 1895 with a supplement in 1901.

In 1899, with Joseph Frank Alderhoven, he was executor of the will of West Indian merchant C. Washington Eves (died 1899). All three were members of the Royal Colonial Institute.

He was commissioned into the 6th Middlesex (St George's) corps as a second lieutenant in 1890. In 1897, he was presented at court as an officer of the 1st Middlesex (Victoria and St George's) Rifles. In 1904, he was a captain and honorary major in that corps. He received the Volunteer Officers' Decoration and in 1916 was appointed companion of the Order of St Michael and St George.

== Death ==
Boosé died on 19 April 1936 at St Andrews Road, Epsom, Auckland, New Zealand. He was survived by his second wife, Louisa. He was cremated and his ashes scattered. Probate was granted in London on an estate of £319.

== Selected publications ==
- Titles of publications relating to the British colonies, their government, etc., in connection with imperial policy &c. Imperial Federation League, London, 1889.
- The Constitution of Colonial Public Libraries. Simpkin, Marshall & Co., London, 1894.
- Catalogue of the Library of the Royal Colonial Institute. Royal Colonial Institute, London, 1895.
- First Supplementary Catalogue of the Library of the Royal Colonial Institute. Royal Colonial Institute, London, 1901.
- Memory serving: Being reminiscences of fifty years of the Royal Colonial Institute. Selwyn & Blount, London, 1928.
