= National Library of Jamaica =

National library in Kingston, Jamaica

- 17.9668°N 76.7897°W
- Location: Kingston, Jamaica
- Established: 1979
- Reference to legal mandate: Institute of Jamaica Act of 1978; The National Library of Jamaica Act, 2010

Collection
- Legal deposit: Legal Deposit Act, 2002

The location of the library

The National Library of Jamaica is the national library of Jamaica. It is located at 12 East Street in Kingston, Jamaica. The library provides access to various collection of Jamaican literature, maps, films, newspapers, photographs, and more.

== History ==
The library was established in 1979 by the Institute of Jamaica Act, 1978 from the collection of the West India Reference Library, which was created by Frank Cundall in 1894. The National Library of Jamaica is part of the Institute of Jamaica. The formation of the library was influenced by proposals calling for the need for such an institution identified by the Jamaica Library Association and other interested organizations.

During COVID-19 the planned preventative measures that the National Library of Jamaica implemented to safeguard the staff, clients and national collections is outlined in an article published in Alexandria.

== Purpose ==
The primary concern of the library is with the collection and preservation, organization and provision of access to all publications relating to Jamaica and its people; including publications created in Jamaica as well as those outside of the island. The library has modernized the library system in the country particularly the access to the collections it provides. It is home to rare as well as contemporary items including collections of books, audio books, maps and plans, manuscripts, newspapers, photographs, audio-visual materials, posters, serials, microfilm, calendars, prints, postcards and event programs. The National Library of Jamaica does not allow for the borrowing of its items for home use for its contents are only for research and study purposes, however, they do provide reading rooms, databases, and photocopying of selected material.

== Divisions ==
The library is composed of three divisions:

Technical Services

- Audiovisual and Micro-graphic services
- Research and Information
- Preservation and Conservation
- Special Collections

Networks and User Services

- Cataloging
- Collections Development
- Information Network Systems
- Digital Resources Development

Corporate Services

- Accounts
- Human Resource Management and Administration

== Board of Management ==
The national library is governed by a board of management currently consisting of up to thirteen members whom of which are responsible for the policy regulations and general supervision of the library. For the year 2019, these members include: Joy Dougas, Chairman, Lydia Rose, Deputy Chairman, Father Michael Allen, Vivian Crawford, Edward Baugh, Troy Caine (27 October 2008 – 10 January 2019), Dawn Henry, Dr. Paulette Kerr, Kellie Magnus, Evon Mullings, Jolette Russell, Beverley Lashley (National Librarian), Rolforde Johnston (Staff Representative).

== See also ==
- List of national libraries
