= Albert Hall Mansions =

Mansion block development in London

Coordinates: 51.50114°N 0.17609°W

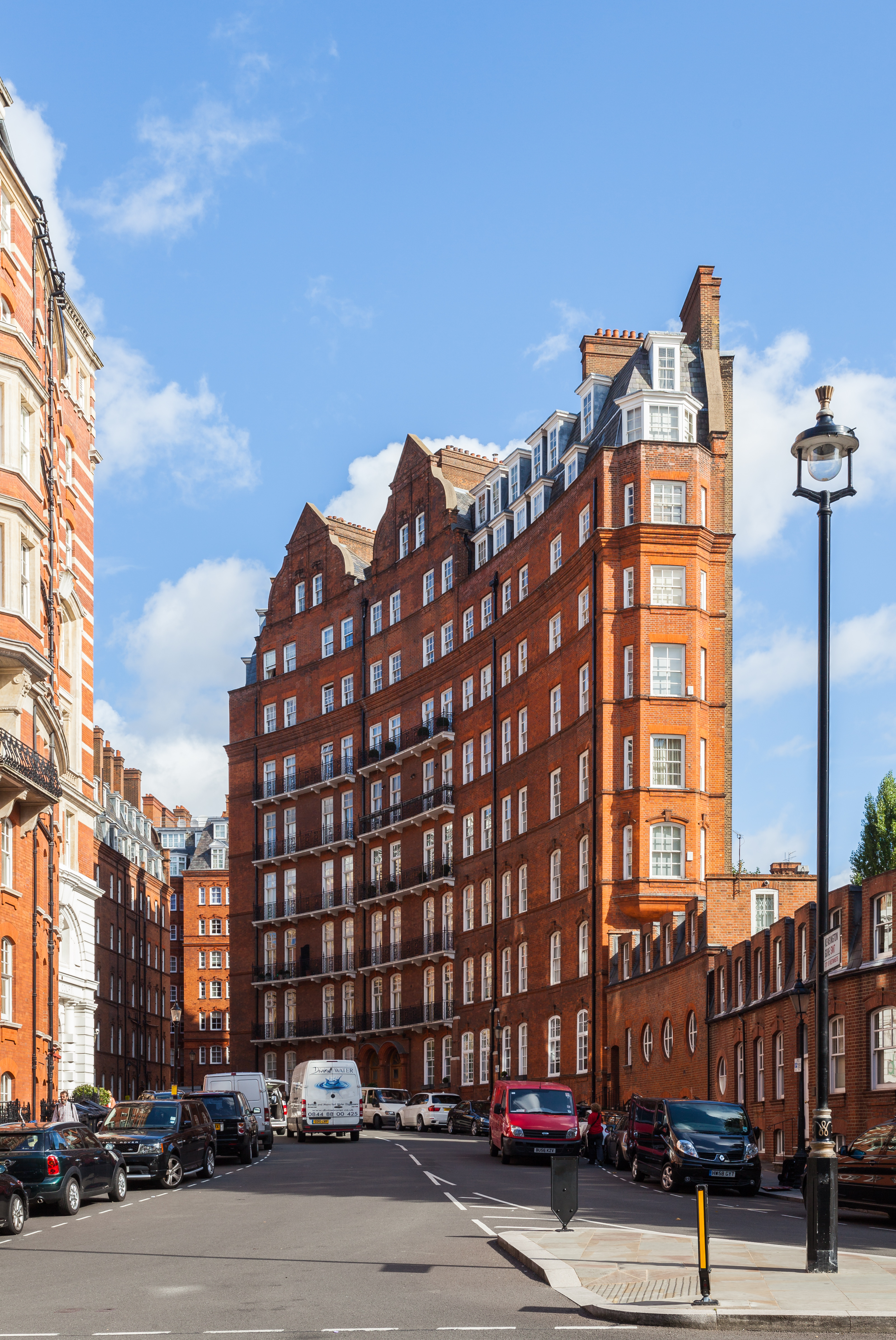
One of the blocks of Albert Hall Mansions

Albert Hall Mansions is a development of several Grade II listed mansion blocks designed by Richard Norman Shaw standing in South Kensington, particularly the area known as "Albertopolis". They flank the east side of the Royal Albert Hall along Kensington Gore and face Kensington Gardens from their north. They are among the earliest development of flats in London, and served as a template for their early spread.

== History ==
The land where the Albert Hall Mansions would be built was owned by the Commissioners of the Great Exhibition. Original plans involved the building of several large houses, however the choice was made to instead build taller mansion blocks. Wary of the criticism faced by a similar early project of building flats in London, the Queen Anne's Mansions, they chose the esteemed architect Richard Norman Shaw to design them.

Albert Hall Mansions are among the first purpose built flats or mansion blocks in London, completed in 1879. The buildings were designed by Richard Norman Shaw, a well known architect working in his Queen Anne style. Despite contemporary and modern criticisms towards its design, the buildings enjoyed immediate success in providing a model for the proliferation of flats in residential developments throughout London but particularly in Kensington towards the end of the 19th century. This largely reflected the latent demand, particularly among the middle class, for high density dwellings which allowed access to the city without the significant investment of owning a house.

== Design ==
The blocks are built in the red brick Queen Anne style, similar to the nearby Lowther Lodge built a few years before, both emblematic of Richard Norman Shaw's characteristic style. They provide a contrast however in their imposing heights reaching up to ten storeys adorned with tall gables and pitched mansard rooves. They are Grade II listed for their historic and architectural significance.

Unlike the "Hankey System", of the Queen Anne's Mansions built a few years earlier, which necessitated communal spaces for dining and recreation, Albert Hall Mansions was composed of individual self-contained units. Shaw had travelled to Paris to research the "continental" design and way of living in flats. The relatively new technology of the lift, made possible by the London Hydraulic Power Company's expansion into Kensington, was retroactively installed into the first buildings and allowed for greater accessibility to the higher floors in the mansions as well as those that followed.

== See also ==
- Kensington Gore
- Royal Albert Hall
- Queen Anne's Mansions
- Albert Court
