= Albert Court =

Mansion block development in London

Coordinates: 51.500341°N 0.176374°W

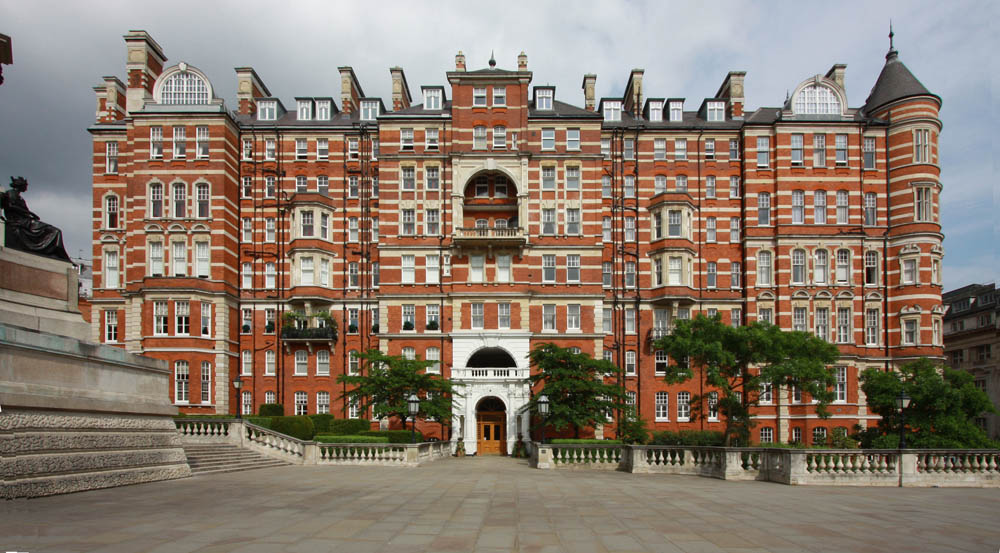
Albert Court as seen from the west.

Albert Court is a Grade II listed mansion block development located in South Kensington, particularly the area known as "Albertopolis". The mansions occupy a plot to the southeast of the Royal Albert Hall along Prince Consort Road.

== History ==
The site occupied by Albert Court was acquired in 1851 and paid for with surplus funds from the Great Exhibition. The area was the site of a garden owned by the Royal Horticultural Society (RHS) that had opened in 1861. The commissioners of the Great Exhibition would lay out Prince Consort Road in 1888 with the aim of constructing residential properties.

Albert Court's construction began in 1890 with Frederick Hemings providing its design. Construction faced issues with the collapse of the Liberator Building Society who had served as chief backers of the developer in 1892, and the death of Hemings in 1894. Robert Worley would take over as architect and the completed building bares his final designs, the building was finished in 1900.

== Design ==
The building typology echoes much of the design of the nearby Albert Hall Mansions which had served as a prototype for the mansion block in London, and many of the sensibilities established by Richard Norman Shaw are transferred. Prominent among its architectural features are the corner turrets and loggias. The curved shape of the plot to the northeast reflects the former boundary of the RHS garden.

The building is Grade II listed for its architectural interest, as well as being part of the Knightsbridge Conservation Area.

== See also ==
- Prince Consort Road
- Royal Albert Hall
- Albert Hall Mansions
