= Illustrated Biographies of the Great Artists =

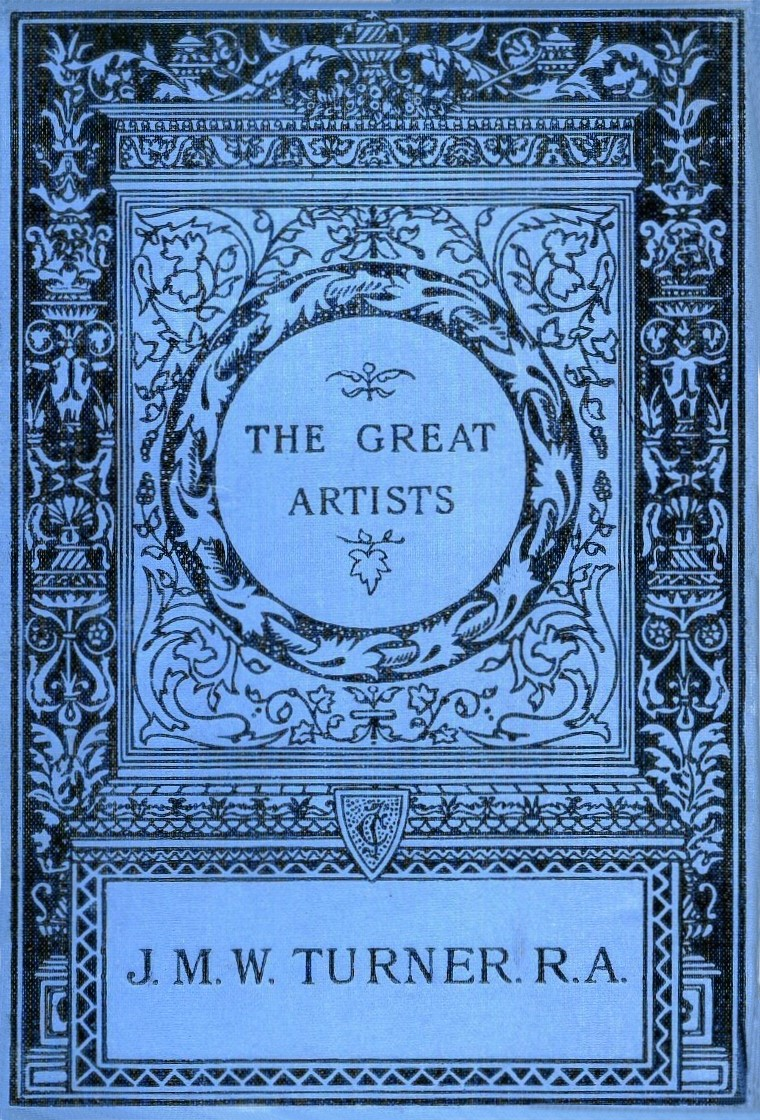
- J. M. W. Turner R.A. by W. Cosmo Monkhouse, 1879, showing the uniform binding of the series
- Editor: Joseph Cundall
- Publisher: Sampson Low, Marston, Searle, & Rivington
- Publication date: 1879
- OCLC: 150044969

The Illustrated Biographies of the Great Artists was a book series in 38 volumes edited by Joseph Cundall and his son Frank, and published by Sampson Low, Marston, Searle, and Rivington in London from 1879 to the 1890s.

== Volumes ==
Incomplete list of volumes:

- Claude Le Lorrain, by Owen J. Dulles.
- Correggio, by M. E. Heaton.
- Della Robbia and Cellini
- Albrecht Dürer, by Richard Ford Heath, 1894.
- The Figure Painters of Holland, Ronald Gower.
- Fra Angelico, Masaccio, and Botticelli
- Fra Bartolommeo, Albertinelli, and Andrea del Sarto, by Leader Scott (the pseudonym of Lucy Baxter), 1881.
- Fra Giovanni Angelico Da Fiesole and The Early Florentine Painters of the Fifteenth Century. Catherine Mary Phillimore
- Thomas Gainsborough, R. A, John Constable, R. A. by George M. Brock-Arnold
- Ghiberti and Donatello
- Angiolotto Bondone Called; Giotto, by Harry Quilter.
- Hans Holbein, by Joseph Cundall, 1892.
- Hogarth, by Henry Austin Dobson.
- Sir Edwin Landseer, by Frederic George Stephens.
- Lawrence and Romney, by Ronald Gower.
- Leonardo da Vinci
- Little Masters of Germany, by W. B. Scott.
- Mantegna and Francis
- Meissonier, by John W. Mollett.
- Michelangelo Buonarotti, by Charles Clémont.
- Murillo, by Ellen E. Minor.
- Overbeck, by J. Beavington Atkinson.
- Raphael, N. D'Anvers.
- Rembrandt, by J. W. Mollett. 1879
- Reynolds, by F. S. Pulling.
- Rubens, Charles William Kett.
- Tintoretto, by W. R. Osler.
- Titian, by Richard Ford Heath.
- J. M. W. Turner R.A., by W. Cosmo Monkhouse, 1879.
- Van Dyck; Frans Hals of Haarlem, by Percy Rendell Head.
- Velázquez, by Edwin Stowe.
- Horace Vernet, Paul Delaroche, by J. Ruutz-Rees.
- Watteau, by J. W. Molett.
- Wilkie, by J. W. Mollett.

== See also ==
- The Great Historic Galleries of England
