= Handbook of Jamaica =

The Handbook of Jamaica for 1922.

The Handbook of Jamaica was an official government handbook of Jamaica first published in 1881 and which continued until the 1950s.

The first edition was produced by Laurence R. Fyfe of the Colonial Secretary's Office and Augustus Constantine Sinclair, head of the Government Printing Office in Jamaica.

In the early twentieth-century the editor was Frank Cundall.

Later editions were published by the Jamaica Information Service.
