= International Inventions Exhibition =

1885 world's fair in South Kensington

Coordinates: 51.497623°N 0.176802°W

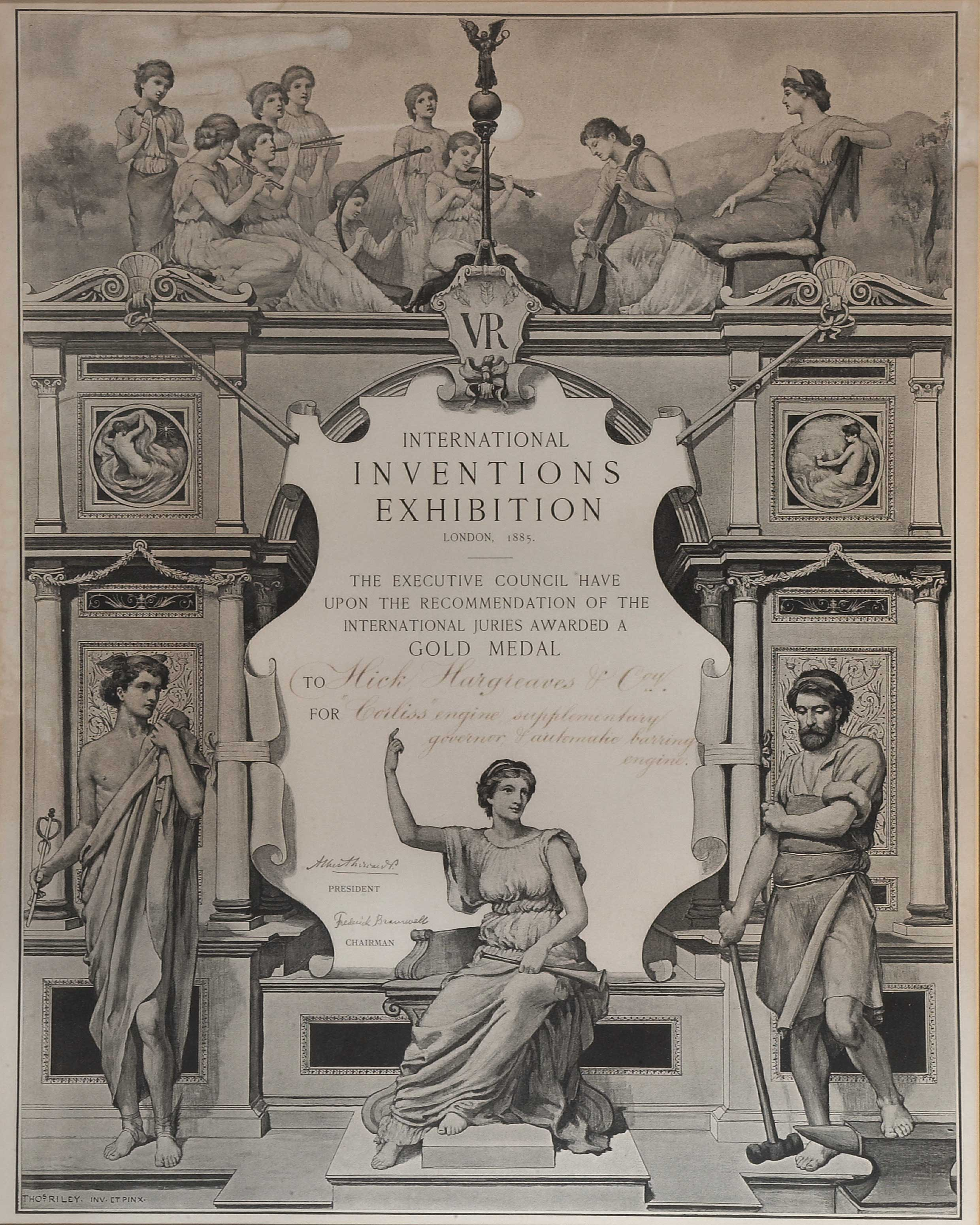
- One of the gold medal certificates awarded at the exhibition (this to Hick, Hargreaves and Co. for their Corliss engine supplementary governor & automatic barring engine.).

Overview
- BIE-class: Unrecognized exposition
- Name: International Inventions Exhibition
- Visitors: three and three-quarters million
- Organized by: Albert Edward, the Prince of Wales (president of the organising committee)

Location
- Country: United Kingdom of Great Britain and Northern Ireland
- City: London

Timeline
- Opening: 4 May 1885

The International Inventions Exhibition was a world's fair held in South Kensington in 1885. As with the earlier exhibitions in a series of fairs in South Kensington following the Great Exhibition, Queen Victoria was patron and her son Albert Edward, the Prince of Wales, was president of the organising committee. It opened on 4 May and three and three-quarters of a million people had visited when it closed 6 months later.

Countries participating included Austria-Hungary, Italy, Japan and the United States as well as the hosts, the United Kingdom.

Attractions included pleasure gardens, fountains and music as well as inventions. One series of concerts including old instruments from Belgium. Other historical exhibits included five heliographs by Niépce with modern photographers such as Captain Thomas Honywood also being present.

Inventions included folding tables, the Sussex trug, lacquer covered wire from OKI, a meter from Ferranti, a 38-stop organ equipped with a new floating-lever pneumatic action, and Philip Cardew won a gold medal for his hot-wire galvanometer, or voltmeter. The Verity Brothers of Leeds won the "highest award for building appliances".

== See also ==
- Expo 91: 1991 World's fair for young inventors
- Henry Willis & Sons for more organ information
- International Fisheries Exhibition 1883
- International Health Exhibition 1884
