= International Health Exhibition =

1884 international exhibition held in London

Coordinates: 51.499°N 0.177°W

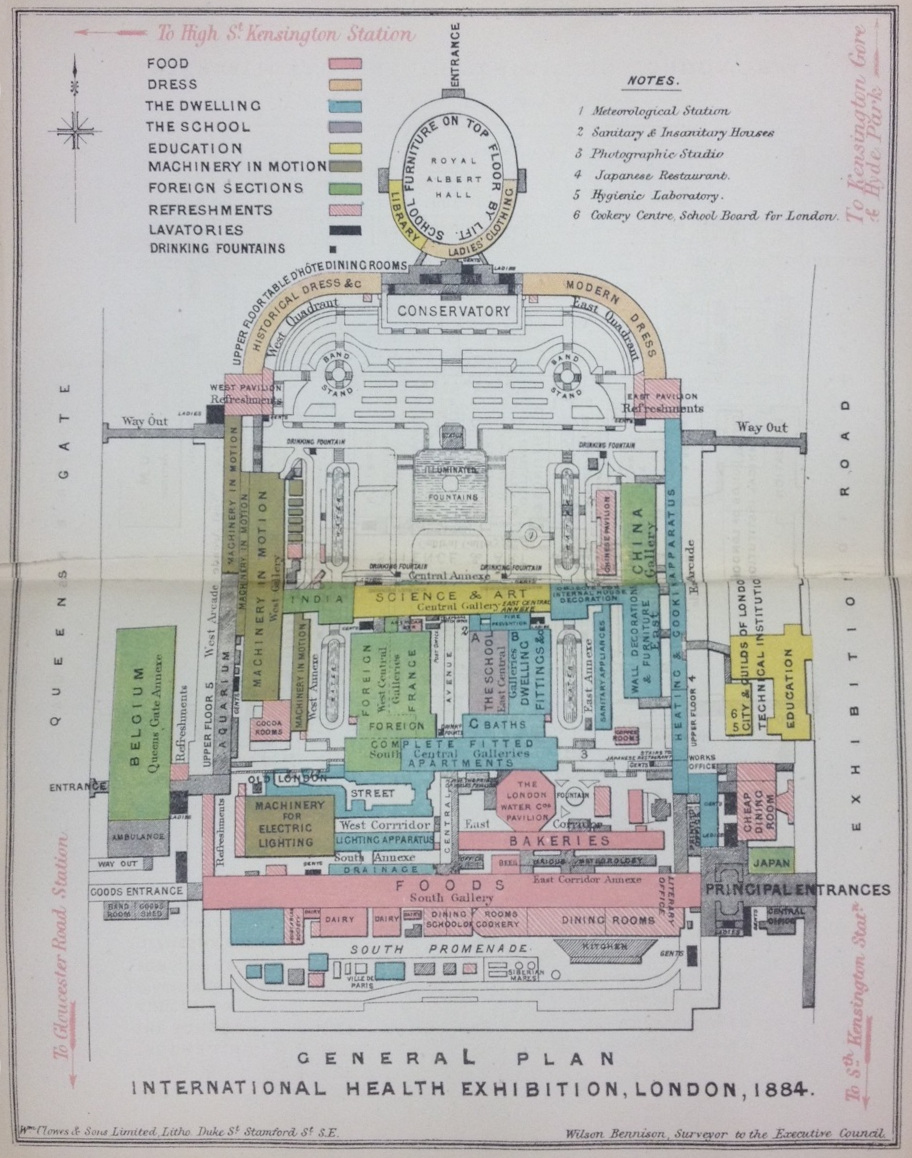
General plan of the International Health Exhibition

The International Health Exhibition was one of a series of international exhibitions held in the Royal Horticultural Society Garden in South Kensington, London, in the 1880s under the patronage of Queen Victoria and the Prince of Wales. Four million people visited the 1884 exhibition. The exhibition's motto was "From labour health, from health contentment springs".

== See also ==
- International Fisheries Exhibition 1883
- International Inventions Exhibition 1885
