= Jamaica International Exhibition =

1891 Kingston
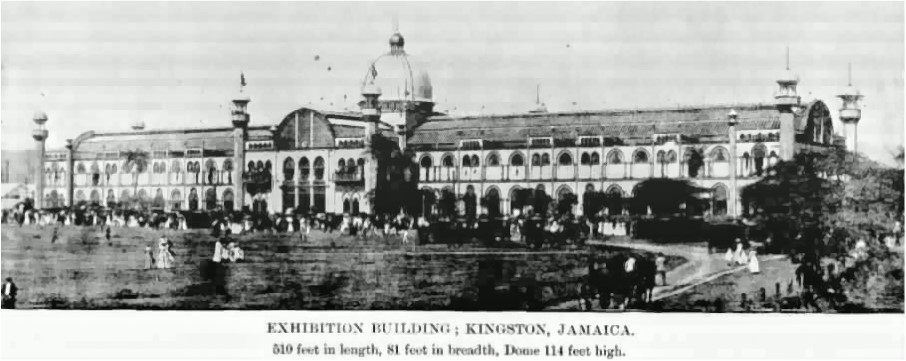
- The Jamaica International Exhibition building

Overview
- BIE-class: Unrecognized exposition
- Visitors: 302,831

Location
- Country: Jamaica
- City: Kingston
- Coordinates: 17.9885°N 76.7877°W

Timeline
- Opening: 27 January 1891
- Closure: 2 May 1891

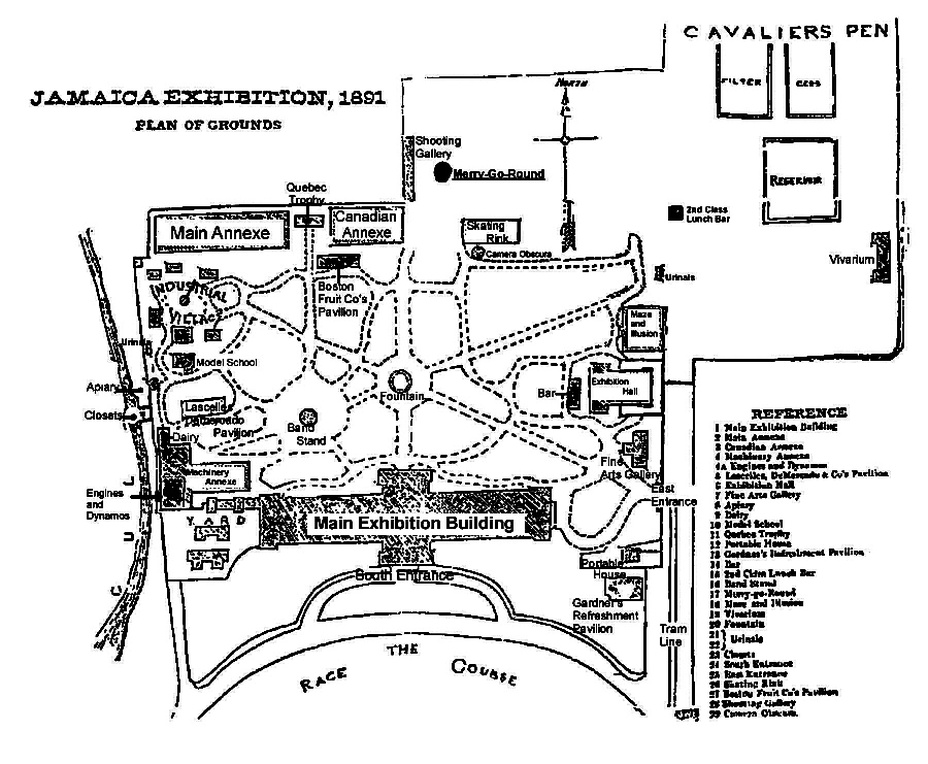
Exhibition plan.

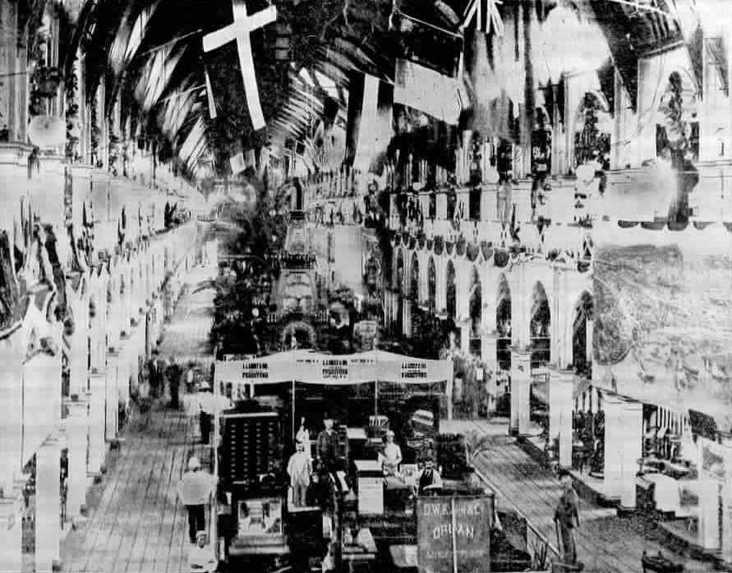
Inside the exhibition.

The Jamaica International Exhibition was held in Kingston, Jamaica, from 27 January 1891 to 2 May 1891. It was modelled on the London Great Exhibition of 1851 and was the idea of Augustus Constantine Sinclair who ran the Government Printing Office in Jamaica.

== Background ==
In the 1880s, Jamaica's economy was in decline. Sugar exports were only a quarter of what they had been the start of the century, and the banana export business was in its infancy. There was a great need to promote Jamaican products to the world and attract investment to the island.

The idea to hold an international exhibition to promote Jamaican industry similar to the 1851 Great Exhibition in London is generally credited to Augustus Constantine Sinclair, head of the Government Printing Office in Jamaica, with subsequent support from William Fawcett, director of gardens and chairman of the Institute of Jamaica. For many years, they were unable to drum up sufficient support for the project, but in 1889 Sir Henry Blake arrived as the new governor of Jamaica and gave the idea his blessings.

== The exhibition ==
The exhibition was funded by a £1,000 grant from the British government and loans from the Jamaican government which were guaranteed by locals, in case the exhibition failed. Louis Verley, George Stiebel, and Colonel Charles Ward, between them guaranteed about half the cost.

The exhibition opened on 27 January 1891.

A special medal was produced for the event, showing Queen Victoria on one side and the exhibition hall on the other. Versions were minted in silver-plated, brass and gold.

The exhibition closed on 2 May 1891 after receiving 302,831 visitors. Despite the high levels of attendance, the exhibition made a loss, resulting in those that had given guarantees being required to provide nearly £30,000 to make up the shortfall.
