= Danford Thomas =

English coroner (1846–1910)

George Danford Phillips Thomas (1846 – 5 August 1910) was the coroner for Central Middlesex in London who estimated that he conducted around 40,000 inquests during his career. He was appointed to hear the inquiry into the human remains found in the basement of Dr. Crippen's home but he died before the inquiry could be completed.

== Early life and family ==
Danford Thomas was born in London in 1846, the son of the Reverend Richard James Francis Thomas (died 1873), curate of Hammersmith and headmaster and chaplain of Bancroft's Hospital, Mile End Road, and from 1855 vicar of Yeovil. Danford received his general education at Bath and afterwards entered as a student at St Mary's Hospital, and became member of the Royal College of Surgeons in 1871. Some five years later he earned his MD at Brussels, taking honours in medical jurisprudence. He also studied at the Inner Temple, and was admitted to the bar.

He observed the Franco-Prussian War (1870–71) as an officer of the British National Society for Aid to the Sick and Wounded in War, a predecessor of the British Red Cross, and his name was mentioned in various reports on the war operations by French authorities, leading to the award of the French Order of Merit in acknowledgement of his services.

He married Sarah De Horne Vaizey in Dorchester in 1872. Their son, Richard, also became a coroner.

== Career ==
Thomas began general practice in Paddington, and was soon after appointed the first Medical Officer of Health for the district of Willesden. In the 1870s he became deputy coroner to Dr. Hardwicke, and later coroner for Central Middlesex. On Hardwicke's death in 1881, Thomas was elected to Hardwicke's post after a closely contested competition. His work as a coroner thus extended over a period of upwards of thirty years, and was spent in what, in respect of urban coronerships' districts, must be one of the largest in point of both area and population. It included as many as fifteen parliamentary divisions. He estimated that he had held around 40,000 inquiries during his career.

The British Medical Journal said that his "success as a coroner was greatly aided by his medical training, his legal knowledge, his wide acquaintance with mankind, his clear, logically working brain, and a fund of sympathy for suffering of all kinds ... on two occasions he went so far as to take into his house professional acquaintances suffering from mental illness, and thus temporarily stranded in London, and treated them as his guests until their recovery."

== Other activities ==
Thomas was a volunteer soldier with the British Army and founded a bearer company in north London, the predecessors of the army's modern field ambulance units. He reached the rank of Brigade Surgeon-Lieutenant-Colonel of the North London Volunteer Rifle Brigade.

He was active in the Unionist Party in Paddington and the promotion of the Primrose League in that district. He was the unsuccessful candidate at Islington in the 1885 parliamentary election when he was opposed by an elder brother of Joseph Chamberlain.

== Death ==
Thomas died on 5 August 1910 while on a short visit to St Leonards. He went there on the adjournment of the Crippen trial, on which he was engaged, when he was already ill. Five years earlier he had experienced an attack of paralysis but had made a practically complete recovery. In their obituary of Thomas, the British Medical Journal attributed his death to an attempt by the London County Council to have Thomas removed from his position on the grounds of ill-health. The council had first attempted to persuade him to resign and then, finding they had no legal power to force the matter, had appealed unsuccessfully to the Lord Chancellor to ask Thomas to give up his position.

The British Medical Journal described the attempted removal as "ill advised", arguing that it was the cause of Thomas's final illness: "Though he had won a complete victory, and had nothing to fear in the future, he seems to have been specially anxious to justify to the full the confidence reposed in him by the Lord Chancellor, and in consequence had practically declined since early this year [1910] to take any advantage of his right to employ a deputy when not feeling well. He had already held since the beginning of the year upwards of 600 inquests, and this great labour, coupled with the extra strain thrown upon him by the peculiar circumstances of the Crippen inquiry, was no doubt the immediate cause of the attack of diabetic coma from which he died."

Thomas was a strong advocate of cremation, and the reformed burial movement in general. He frequently dissuaded those who appeared before him in court from indulging in expensive funerals, and had given instructions that when the time came for his own interment his remains should be either cremated or otherwise disposed of in the simplest fashion available. It was in accordance with this wish that his funeral took place at Hastings instead of from his own house, and that the earth-to-earth or Haden system of interment was adopted.

He was survived by his wife and son. He left an estate of £3,308 and his executors were his son Richard and his deputy Walter Schröder.

== Notable cases ==
Among the notable inquests held by Thomas were:

- The murder of Matilda Hacker at 4 Euston Square, 1879. (The "Euston Square mystery")
- The Rainham Mystery of 1887.
- The murder of Archibald Wakely in 1906. (The "Westbourne Grove Studio Murder")
- The shooting of William Whiteley, 1907.
- The murder of Emily Dimmock, 1907. (The "Camden Town Murder")
- The Dr. Crippen case, 1910.
