= Joseph Cundall =

English publisher and photographer (1818–1895)

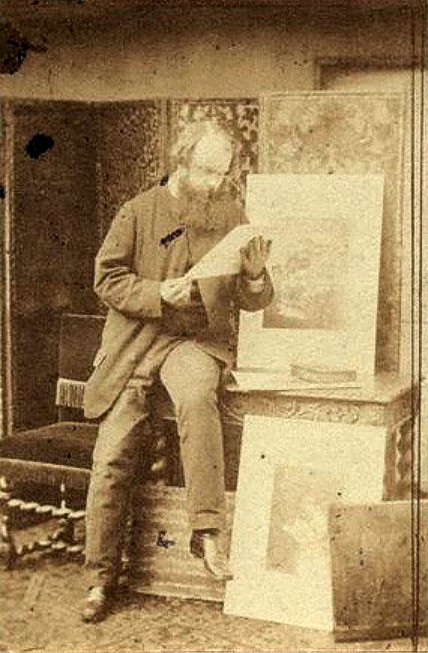
Joseph Cundall, albumen carte-de-visite, 1860s

Joseph Cundall (22 September 1818 – 10 January 1895) was a Victorian English writer under the pseudonym of "Stephen Percy", a pioneer photographer and London publisher of children's books. He provided employment for many of the best artists of the day by using them as illustrators.

Joseph was the son of Eliza and Benjamin Cundall, a draper. He trained as a printer in Ipswich, and aged 16 found work in London with Charles Tilt, a bookseller and publisher. He wrote two books for Tilt and succeeded N Hailes in 1841 at the Juvenile Library, 12 Old Bond Street. In 1848 he started a lending library for children called St. George's Reading Library. In 1843 Cundall became publisher of the Home Treasury children's books, a series conceived and edited by Henry Cole under the pseudonym Felix Summerly. Cole, who was later knighted, became the first director of South Kensington Museum which later changed its name to the Victoria and Albert Museum. In 1848, he transformed the antagonist in "The Story of the Three Bears" from an ugly old woman to a pretty little girl in his Treasury of Pleasure Books for Young Children.

Because of his association with Henry Cole, his early business ventures were successful, but by 1849 he had gone bankrupt. During the same year he started a partnership with H M Addey and moved his business premises to 21 Old Bond Street. This partnership dissolved in 1852 and Cundall moved to 168 New Bond Street, where his interest in photography started and where he founded The Photographic Institution and was a founder member of the Royal Photographic Society of London. His partners included Robert Howlett (1831–1858) (famed for his iconic portrait of Isambard Kingdom Brunel), George Downes (1812–1877) and Philip Henry Delamotte (1821–1889) who, in 1853, held what was the second photographic exhibition in Britain and photographed the reconstruction of The Crystal Palace at Sydenham in 1854. Cundall is noted for his photographs detailing the construction of the SS Great Eastern between 1854 and 1856, and his portraits of Crimean Heroes in 1856.

In 1871 the British Government sent Cundall to Bayeux to manage the first photographic record of the Bayeux Tapestry. Cundall's photographic business traded at first as Cundall, Howlett & Co, then Cundall, Howlett & Downes, Cundall, Downes & Co., and between 1866 and 1872 as Cundall & Fleming.

He married Sarah Ranson in 1845 (she died in 1868) and then Emily Anne Thompson (who died in 1911).

== Bibliography ==
- Ruari McLean, Joseph Cundall, A Victorian Publisher. Pinner, Middlesex: Private Libraries Association, 1976 SBN SBN 900002-13-1
- Joseph Cundall, A Brief History of Wood-engraving from its Invention. 1895.
