= Nancy Bell (author) =

British translator and author

- Born: 2 September 1844; Lambeth, Surrey, England
- Died: 30 August 1933 (aged 88); Keynsham, Somerset, England
- Other names: Mrs Arthur Bell, N. D'Anvers
- Occupations: Writer and Translator
- Years active: 1874–1920
- Known for: Translating Jules Verne
- Notable work: The Elementary History of Art

Nancy Regina Emily Meugens Bell (2 September 1844 – 30 August 1933) was a British translator and author of partial Belgian descent.

== Home life ==
Bell was born to Peter Joseph Meugens (1808–1886) and Elizabeth Caroling Bennet (1807–1845). Peter Joseph was born in Antwerp and became a naturalised British subject. He variously gave his occupation on census returns and birth registration forms as colonial broker or merchant. Bell's mother died before she was a year old, and her father quickly remarried to Emily Wallis (1821–1883) before Bell was two years old.

Bell was living with her father and stepmother in Wandsworth at the time of the 1871 census. She was already writing translations, with her first major work published in 1873. By 3 April 1881 (census night), Bell was boarding at 61 Elsham Road, Kensington, London, and described herself as an authoress and teacher on the census return.

In 1882, she married the landscape painter Arthur George Bell (21 February 1849 – 24 September 1916). The couple had three children, two boys and one girl (the youngest). These were:

- Kenneth Normal Bell (1884–1951)
- Eric Arthur Bell (1885–1912)
- Irene Agnes Bell (1887–1946)

The family lived in Southend-on-Sea on 5 April 1891 and described themselves as an authoress (Nancy) and artist (Arthur) on the census return. In 1891, they moved to Southbourne, Dorset (near Bournemouth), where they stayed in two different houses before moving to Rasgarth a house which Arthur Bell had designed and built with a good eye to natural light. The Bournemouth Graphic described it in 1903 as an ideal painter's home.

The Bells were still there in 1901, but the 1911 Census found them at St. Georges, Queens Road, Richmond, Surrey. They still kept the house in Bournemouth, as it was here on 24 September 1919 that Arthur died suddenly from a heart attack. Bell held an exhibition of her husband's work in Rasgarth in 1920 to raise funds for the blind.

== Work ==
Bell produced a surprisingly large volume of work while active. The list below only gives a small flavour of her output. She used the pseudonyms Nancy D'Anvers or N. D'Anvers (Nancy of Antwerp) until her marriage, after which she wrote as Mrs Arthur Bell.

Her first major work was a translation of Jules Verne's Les pays des fourrers. The original work had been published in France on 19 June 1873, and Bell had finished her translation by October, with Sampson Low publishing The Fur Country in November, in time for the Christmas market. This was only the first of her three Jules Verne translations. She may have contributed to a fourth translation, of Around the World in 80 Days, but the extent of her input is uncertain.

She continued to work until 1920, producing translations, religious, travel, and art history books until about 1920. She was an ardent Catholic and produced several hagiographies. She also wrote some books for children including Nanny, Pixie, Dobbie, Red Jem, Pierre: A Tale of Normandy, Hindu Tales etc.

In 1902, the publisher George Bell & Sons contracted her to write a biography of James McNeill Whistler. Whistler was appalled, and there is a long correspondence of 24 letters in which Bell tried to get Whistler to agree to photographs of his paintings being used in the book. The book was only published in 1904, after Whistler's death, and the letters form part of the Whistler collection at the University of Glasgow.

Many of Bell's books were illustrated by her husband, Arthur, and the lithographs form an important example of his work. Sixteen of his paintings are in public collections in the UK.

== Death ==
Bell was living at Burlington House near Bristol when she died on 30 August 1933. Her will was administered by her son Kenneth, who was by then a Fellow of Balliol College in Oxford. Bell's estate was worth £1,536 1s. She was survived by her son Kenneth and her daughter Irene.

== Selected publications ==
- An Elementary History of Art (1874; 2nd ed: 1882) (1889 edition)
- Jules Verne, The Fur Country; or, Seventy degrees North latitude (1874)
- Raphael (1879)
- Venezia (1894, translated)
- Among the Women of the Sahara (1900, translated)
- Lives and Legends of the Evangelists, Apostles, and other early Saints (1901)
- Lives and Legends of the English Bishops and Kings, Mediæval Monks, and other later Saints (1904)
- Paolo Veronese (1904)
- Nuremberg (1905)
- Tintoretto (1905)
- The Royal Manor of Richmond with Petersham, Ham and Kew (1907)
- The Historical Outskirts of London (1907)
- The Skirts of the Great City (1908)
- Mantegna (1911)
- Architecture (1914)
- Hindu Tales from the Sanskrit (1919) (edited)
- Jules Verne, The Blockade Runners
