= Colonial and Indian Exhibition =

1886 exhibition in South Kensington, London

Coordinates: 51.498605°N 0.176768°W

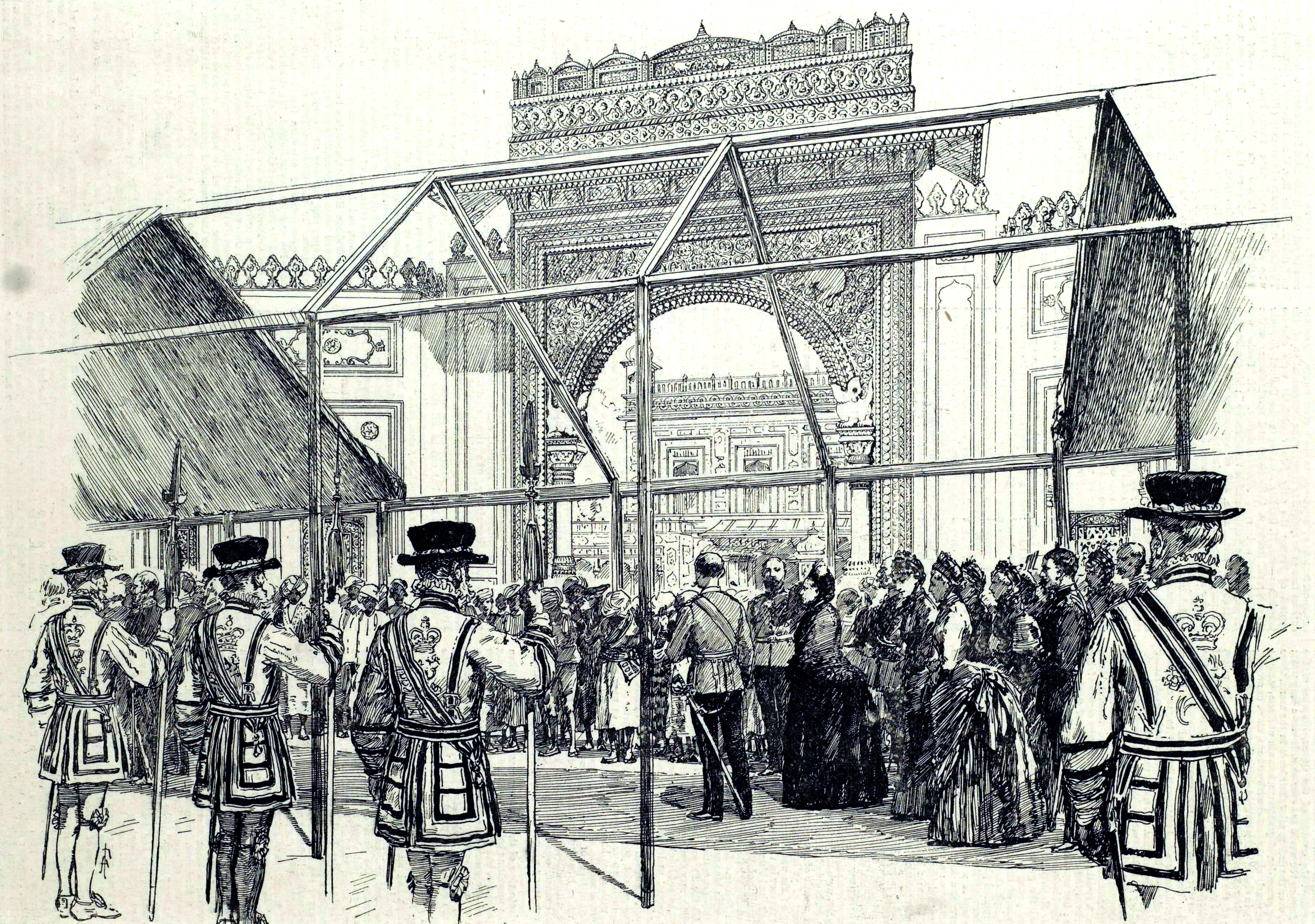
- The Queen Opening the Colonial and Indian Exhibition: Procession passing the principal entrance to the Indian Palace", The Illustrated London News, May 1886.

Overview
- BIE-class: Unrecognized exposition
- Name: Colonial and Indian Exhibition
- Area: South Kensington
- Visitors: 5.5 million

Location
- Country: United Kingdom of Great Britain and Ireland
- City: London

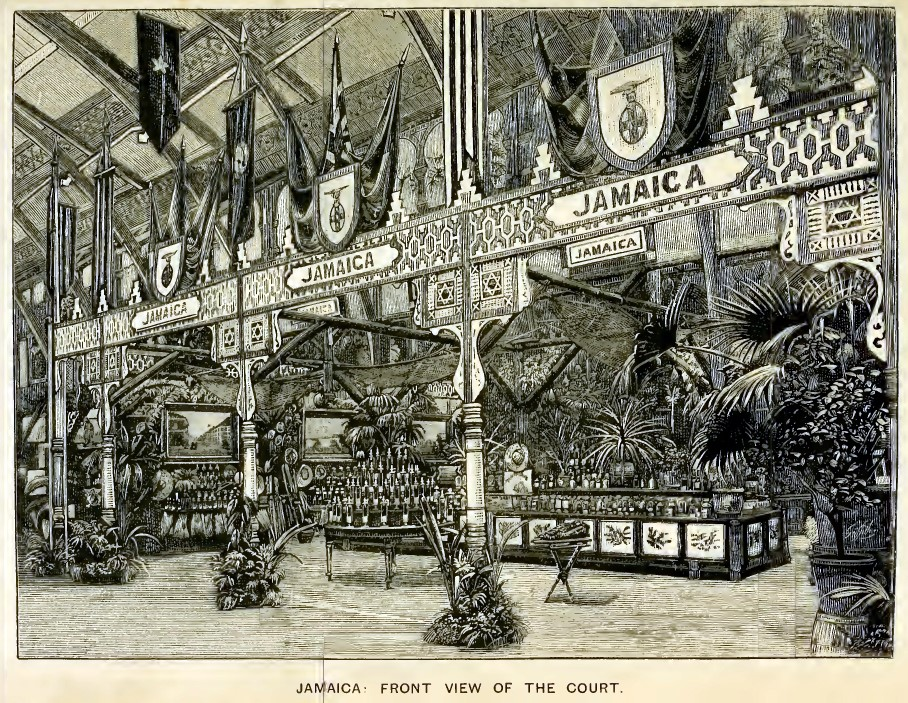
Jamaica's display at the exhibition.

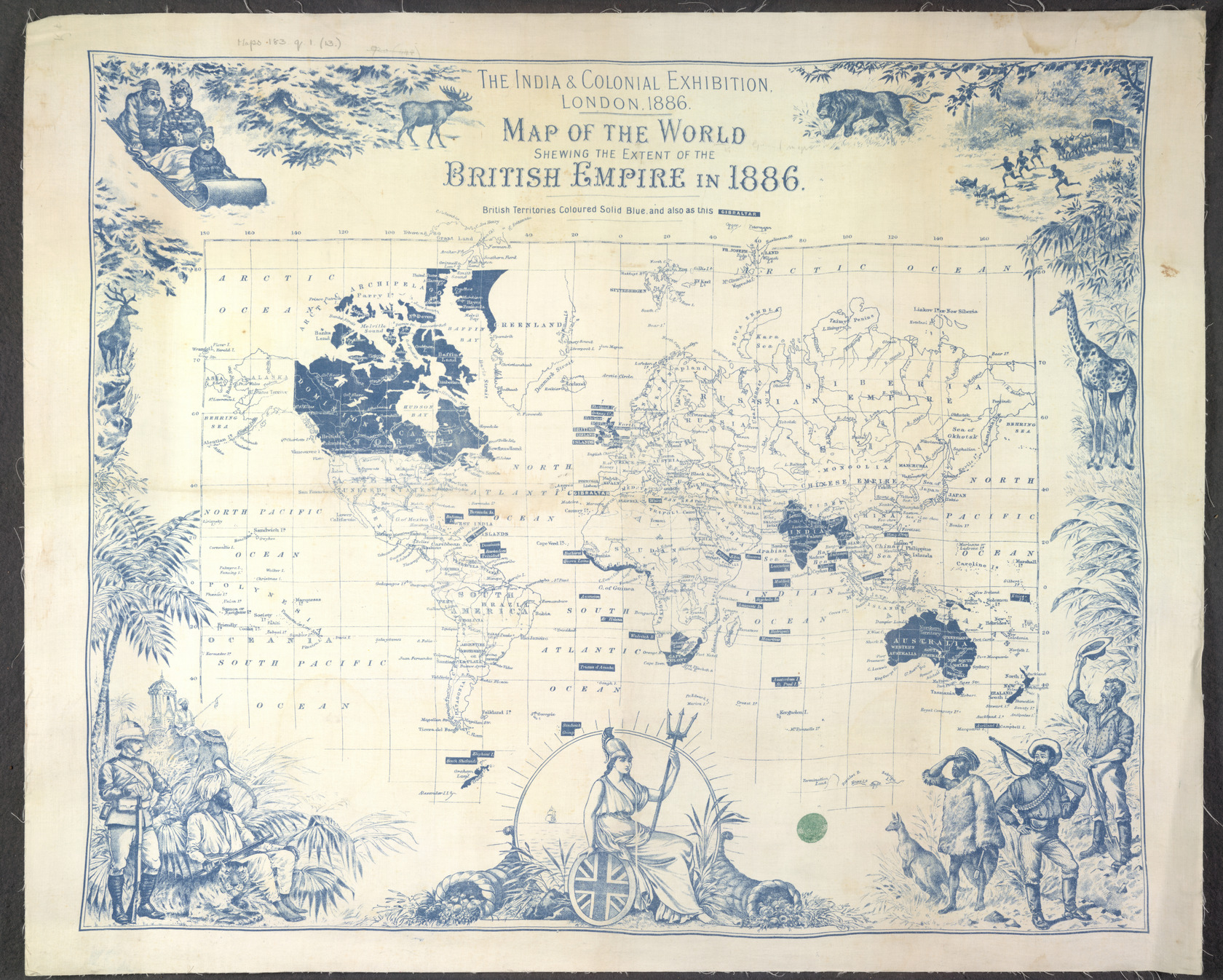
Linen map of the British Empire that was sold at the exhibition.

The Colonial and Indian Exhibition of 1886 was held in South Kensington in London with the objective to (in the words of the then Prince of Wales) "stimulate commerce and strengthen the bonds of union now existing in every portion of her Majesty's Empire". The exhibition was opened by Queen Victoria, and had received 5.5 million visitors by the time it closed.

It was housed in a collection of purpose-built buildings designed in an Indian style.

== Display ==
In 1886, the bonds of the British Empire and the British Raj were intended to be strengthened by the Colonial and Indian Exhibition. In New Zealand, there was a suggestion that the showcases should be made of native woods. A fernery was included in the New Zealand Court and a display of frozen mutton represented the burgeoning agricultural industries. A pātaka (storehouse), originally carved in the 1850s dominated the large Maori collection assembled by the naturalist Walter Buller along with the tomb of a Ngati Pikiao chief. A series of Māori portraits by Gottfried Lindauer, within an ethnological context, was also shown. In another building, the fine art section, consisted of over one hundred paintings, mostly New Zealand landscapes. Among them was The Haunt of the Moa, a Scene in a Puriri Forest (1885) by the artist Kennett Watkins.

Exhibits shown included a ceremonial sword from the colony of Lagos, a grasshopper swatter from the Straits Settlements, and Albert Bierstadt's painting of the Bahama Islands After A Norther was displayed in the West Indian gallery, and admired by the Prince of Wales

The Indian artware section was split into different areas representing the various princely states. The Rajputana entrance was a large Jaipur gate constructed of and provided by the then Maharaja of Jaipur. The Gwalior gateway which had been displayed at the Calcutta International Exhibition (1883) was loaned by the Victoria and Albert Museum.

Several dozen Indian artisans were present at the exhibition, displaying the process of crafting their artisanal works. The men were reputedly from a prison in Agra, and historians have described their presence as part of an effort by colonial officials in India to demonstrate how they were conducting a long-term project to "reform the criminal castes".

== Legacy ==
The Jaipur Gate built for the exhibition was renovated in 2004, and is on display at the Hove Museum and Art Gallery. After the exhibition, the Gwalior gateway was re-erected in gallery 48A at the South Kensington Museum, now the Victoria and Albert Museum, but is now hidden behind a modern facia.

The Durbar Hall exhibited at the exhibition is on display at the Hastings Museum and Art Gallery.

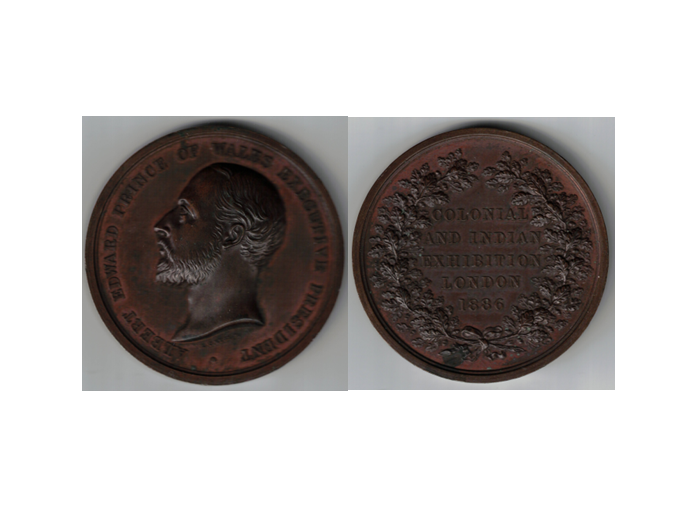
Medal struck for the exhibition
