= Woolston railway station =

Railway station in Southampton, England

Coordinates: 50°53′56″N 1°22′37″W

Woolston
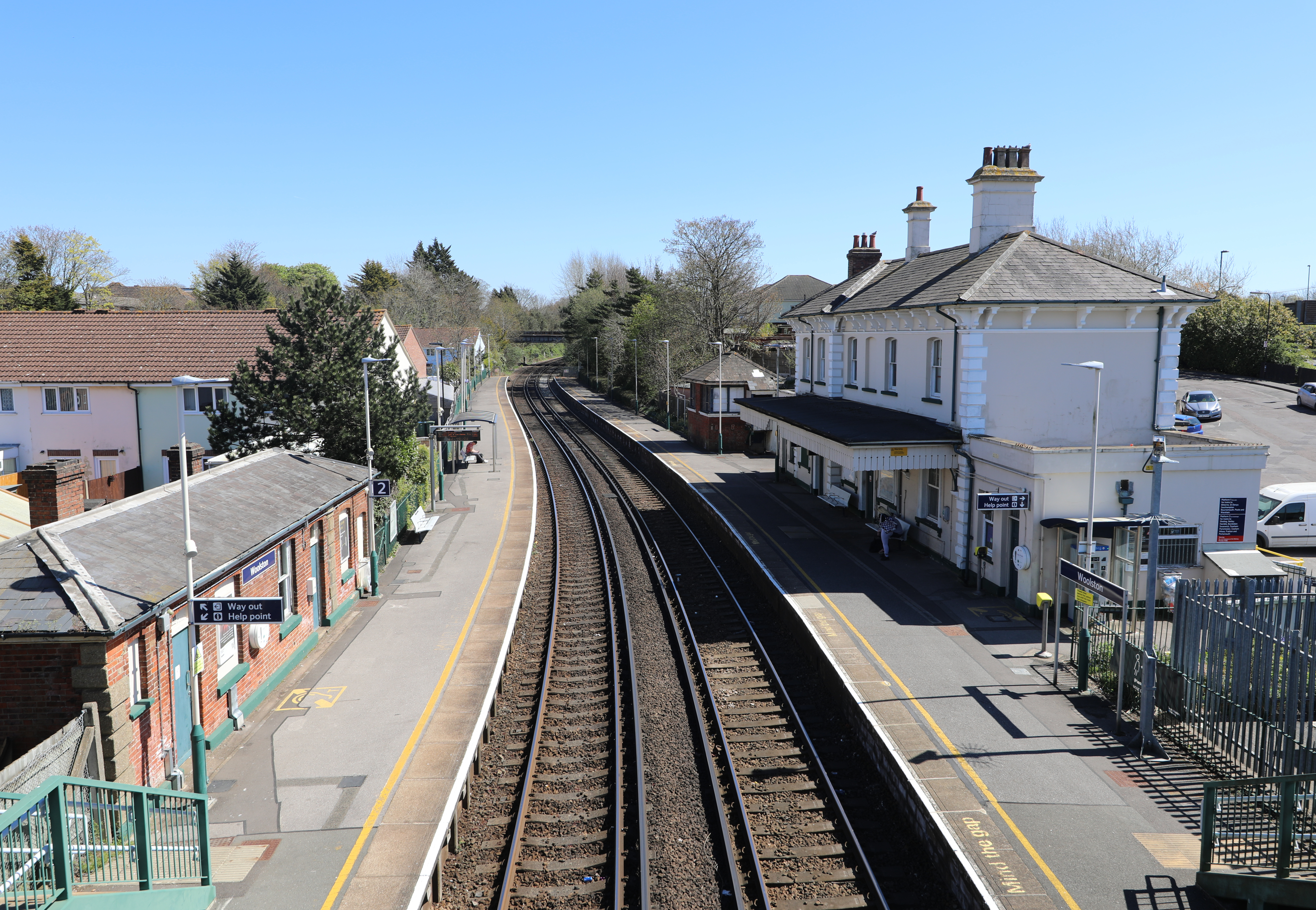

General information
- Location: Woolston, Southampton; England
- Grid reference: SU439112
- Manager: South Western Railway
- Platforms: 2

Other information
- Station code: WLS
- Classification: DfT category E

History
- Opened: 5 March 1866
- Original company: Southampton and Netley Railway
- Pre-grouping: London and South Western Railway
- Post-grouping: Southern Railway

Passengers
- 2020/21: ▼37,128
- 2021/22: ▲91,822
- 2022/23: ▲0.105 million
- 2023/24: ▼0.104 million
- 2024/25: ▲0.180 million
Location
Notes
- Passenger statistics from the Office of Rail and Road

Woolston railway station is a grade II listed station serving the suburb of Woolston in the city of Southampton, England. The station is operated by South Western Railway. West of the station, the line runs along the east bank of the River Itchen giving a view across the city of Southampton, including Southampton FC's ground.

== History ==
The station was built in 1866 in an Italianate style typical of William Tite who designed other stations for the London & South Western Railway company. A single track line was operated by the Southampton & Netley Railway to serve the Royal Victoria Military Hospital at Netley, which station was also built in an Italianate style.

The station, with a train waiting in it, was bombed during a raid on the Spitfire works at Woolston during the Second World War, and suffered damage. The station's extensive goods yard and brick shed was closed in 1967. In June 2010 the former Southern Railway concrete footbridge bridge at the west end of the station was replaced.

== Services ==
Services at Woolston are operated by Southern and South Western Railway using Class 377, 387 and 450 EMUs.

The typical off-peak service in trains per hour is:

- 2 tph to Brighton via Worthing
- 1 tph to Portsmouth & Southsea
- 3 tph to Southampton Central (2 of these run non-stop and 1 calls at all stations)

On Sundays, the Southern services between Southampton Central and Brighton via Worthing do not call.

Preceding station	National Rail	Following station
Sholing	South Western Railway West Coastway Line	Bitterne
Swanwick	Southern West Coastway Line	Southampton Central
