= Royal Victoria Railway =

Coordinates: 50°52′2.19″N 1°20′25.74″W

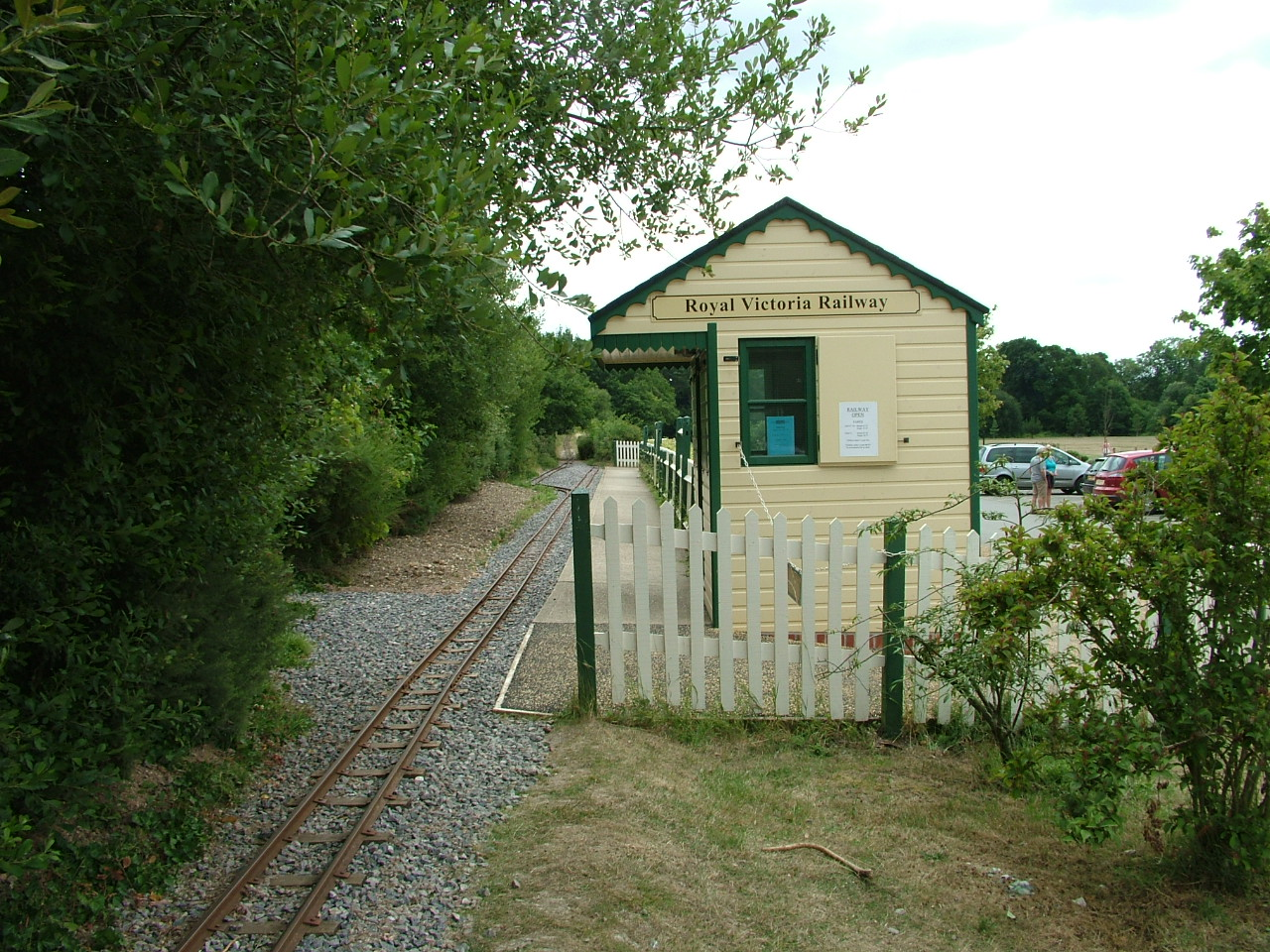
- Chapel road station

Overview
- Locale: Royal Victoria Country Park in Netley, Hampshire, England

Technical
- Track gauge: 10 1/4 in (260 mm)
- Length: 0.6 miles (0.97 km)

Other
- Website: http://www.royalvictoriarailway.co.uk/

The Royal Victoria Railway runs for around 0.6 miles (0.97 km) through Royal Victoria Country Park in Netley, Hampshire, England, with views of Southampton Water. It is run entirely by volunteers. The line is built to the popular gauge of 10 1/4 in (260 mm) and runs every weekend throughout the year and all school holidays.

== Locomotives ==
The following table shows all the engines currently on the Royal Victoria Railway.

Number	Name	Type	Railway	Notes	Image
1	Maurice The Major	Diesel	RVR	The original engine, built for the line.	
D1000	Western Independence	Diesel			
D1002	Western Explorer	Diesel			
D1011	Western Thunderer	Diesel			
2	Basil The Brigadier	Steam			
3	Trevithick	Steam			
4	Isambard Kingdom Brunel	Steam	RVR		
6	Sammy The Sargent	Steam	RVR		
2006	The Engineer	Steam		Full Overhaul Needed.	
111	The Great Bear	Steam		Renamed from Coronation.	
6100	Royal Scot	Steam		Full Overhaul Needed.	

== The line ==
The ride normally starts at Piccadilly, named after the park road junction just opposite. Tickets are bought from the engine shed, opposite a well laid out yard, which is in fact the area for a new station building. The carriage shed is also here. Upon leaving the station, which is set into the hillside the line curves, crosses a set of points, that lead up to the yard and hence the engine shed, and runs along a straight parallel with Southampton water. The view from here is obscured by gorse hedges. At the end of the straight is another point, put in place for the new extension being built. The train will always curve left here and run inland. On the left, a new double track section can be seen. leading back to the yard and the site of a new terminus station through the carriage shed.

The line curves right at this point and begins to descend entering a closely wooded section and then a cutting before and curving around an 'S' bend and emerging onto an embankment. Here there are panoramic views of Southampton Water and the Chapel, last remnant of the once huge military hospital. At the bottom of this embankment is a short section of hedge, which gives way to Chapel Road Station. This station is normally closed. At the far end is a smart ticket office and waiting room. Upon leaving the level chapel road station, the line begins to climb crossing the first level crossing and running between the gorse bank and the car park on an embankment. There is a 'S' bend through a patch of small trees before the line emerges to run below the playground and past the tea rooms just above the former hospital branch track bed.

The line curves inland again and crosses a second crossing just opposite the recently refurbished Cedar Tea Rooms. Here the line begins to climb more steeply and, if you are lucky enough to be on a steam engine you can hear the engine working hard to climb the steep grade as it enters some woodland and another cutting, surrounding a large playground. At the deepest point of the cutting the line, curves sharply. This is the sharpest curve on the whole line and will need realigning before the planned tunnel can be built. Curving right, out of the sharp bend and through another 'S', the line runs straight, climbing alongside the sensory garden and emerges from the woods across another level crossing and left past the first playground. Views here run back to the lower level and across to Southampton Water and the chapel. The line then re enters the trees, across the last level crossing, down a short straight which brings us to Piccadilly and the end of our journey.

== Extension ==
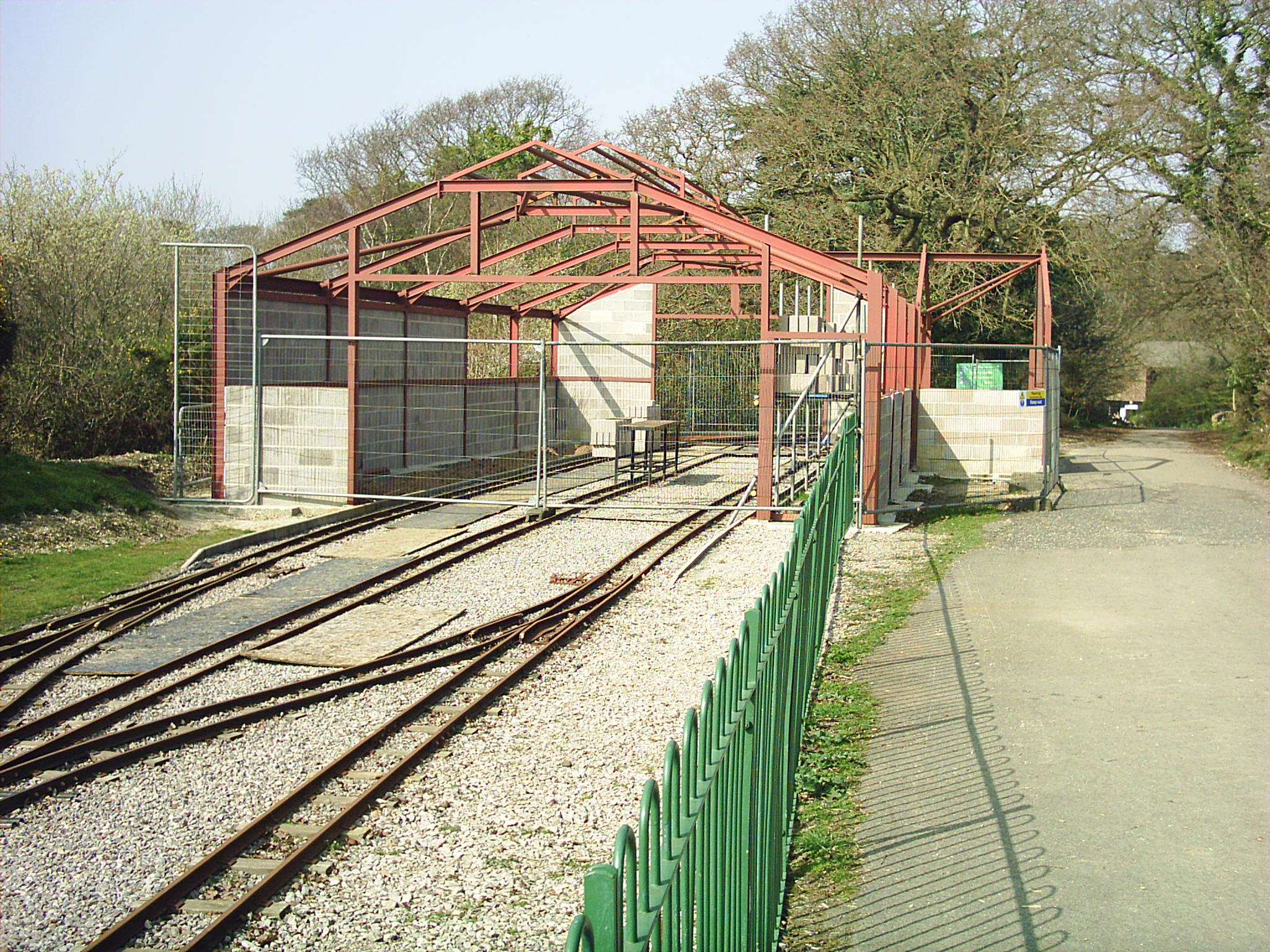
New terminus station during construction

There is in place a new terminus station (during construction shown above), opposite the engine shed. This will then lead into the carriage shed, which doubles up as a tunnel. At the other side of it, the line splits into two tracks. At the end, the left hand line joins the main circuit. The right hand track crosses over the current mainline looping back around a new curve to connect back onto the mainline, facing in the opposite direction. Trains will eventually leave by the left track, travel around the main circuit and then continue straight on at the points to the new loop, over the diamond crossing and return through the carriage shed to the new station terminus. The work has been completed by volunteers including the brick work on the turntable, the block work for the building and the new curve.

== Stations ==
- Chapel Road Station
- Piccadilly Station
