= Bitterne railway station =

Railway station in Hampshire, England

Coordinates: 50°55′05″N 1°22′37″W

Bitterne
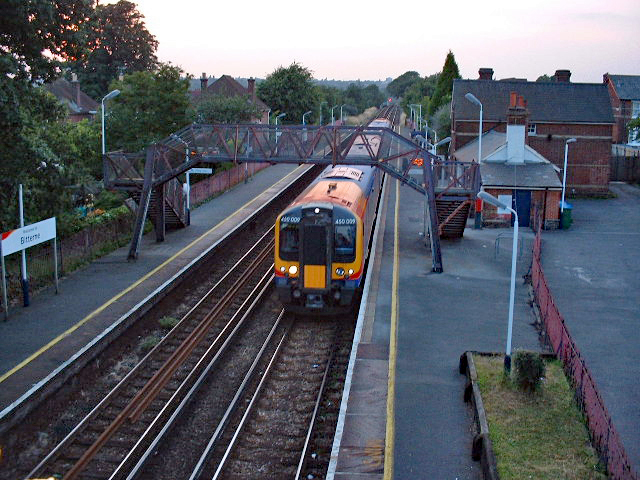
- Bitterne Station

General information
- Location: Bitterne, Southampton; England
- Grid reference: SU438133
- Managed by: South Western Railway
- Platforms: 2

Other information
- Station code: BTE
- Classification: DfT category F2

History
- Opened: 5 March 1866
- Original company: Southampton and Netley Railway
- Pre-grouping: London and South Western Railway
- Post-grouping: Southern Railway

Passengers
- 2020/21: ▼19,646
- 2021/22: ▲55,388
- 2022/23: ▲65,298
- 2023/24: ▲71,222
- 2024/25: ▲83,962
Location
Notes
- Passenger statistics from the Office of Rail and Road

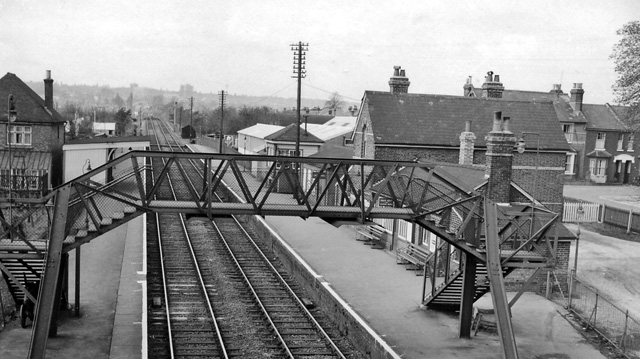
View NW, towards Southampton in 1963

Bitterne railway station is located in eastern Southampton, England. It is on the main Southampton to Portsmouth coastal line, and serves the suburbs of Bitterne, Bitterne Manor, Bitterne Park and Midanbury.

== History ==
The station was opened in March 1866 as Bitterne Road railway station. The station itself is located a mile west of Bitterne village, although original plans for the railway line would have seen the railway pass right through the centre of the village.

The line was originally single-track between St Denys and Fareham, with Bitterne acting as a "passing loop", where trains travelling in opposite directions could pass one another. There were three passing loops at stations on this stretch, with Netley and Swanwick being the other two.

In 2024, the old waiting room of the station, which had been unused for 30 years, was refurbished and reopened as a community hub by Friends of Bitterne Station with funding from Hampshire Community Rail partnership. The hub includes a community garden and space for events and meetups.

== Services ==
All services at Bitterne are operated by South Western Railway using Class 450 EMUs.

The typical off-peak service is one train per hour in each direction between Portsmouth & Southsea and Southampton Central. Additional services call at the station during the peak hours.

Preceding station	National Rail	Following station
Woolston	South Western Railway West Coastway Line	St Denys
