= Netley railway station =

Railway station in Hampshire, England

Coordinates: 50.875°N 1.342°W

Netley
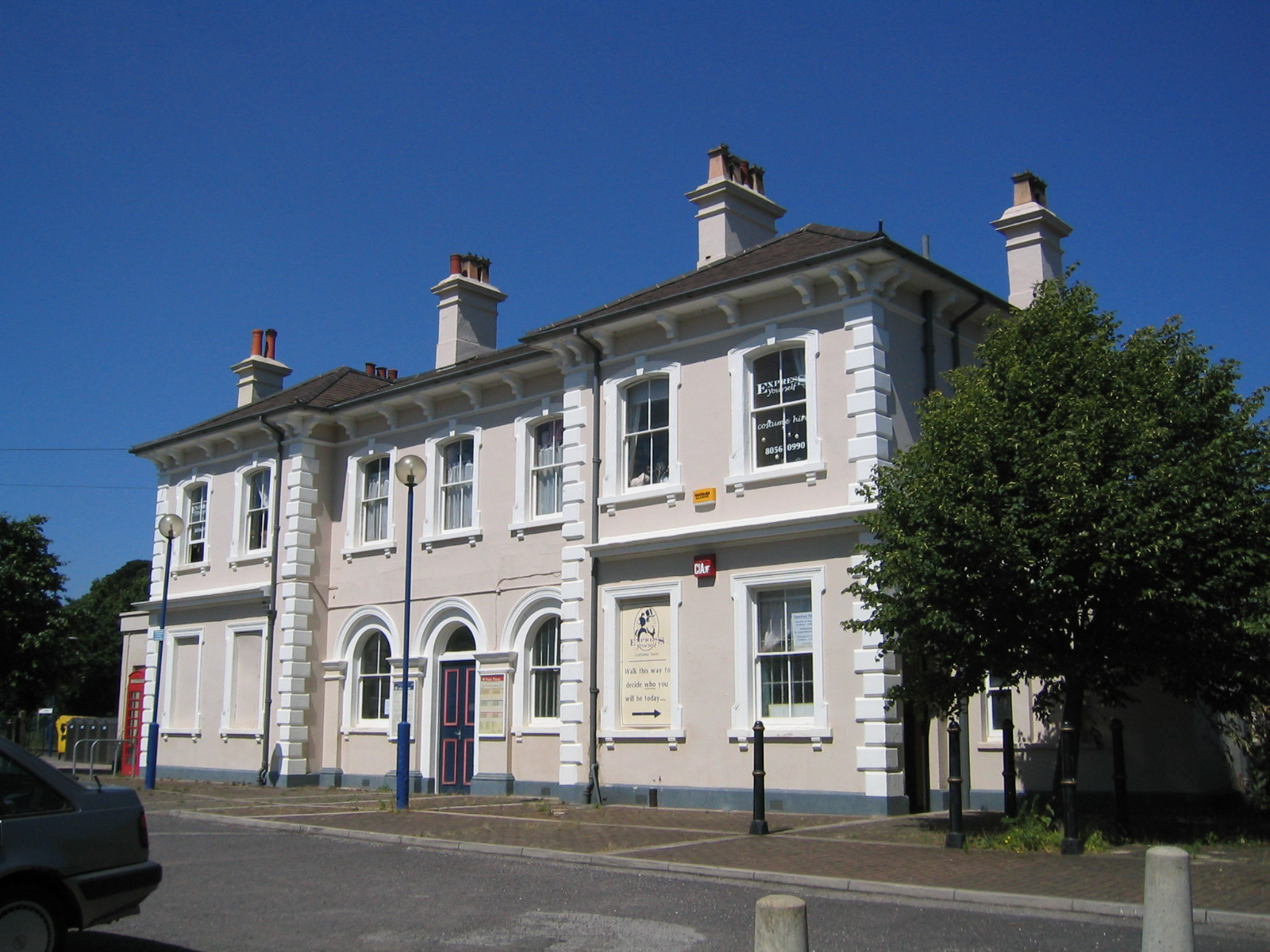
- Netley station building

General information
- Location: Netley, Eastleigh; England
- Grid reference: SU464085
- Managed by: South Western Railway
- Platforms: 2

Other information
- Station code: NTL
- Classification: DfT category E

History
- Opened: 5 March 1866
- Original company: Southampton and Netley Railway
- Pre-grouping: London and South Western Railway
- Post-grouping: Southern Railway

Passengers
- 2020/21: ▼25,292
- 2021/22: ▲64,764
- 2022/23: ▲73,804
- 2023/24: ▲74,046
- 2024/25: ▲82,450
Location
Notes
- Passenger statistics from the Office of Rail and Road

Netley railway station is located near the village of Netley in Hampshire, England. The station is run by South Western Railway and is on the West Coastway Line. Near to the station is Royal Victoria Country Park. The line into the village from the west was built by the Southampton and Netley Railway, though by the time it was opened in March 1866 the aforementioned company had been taken over by the London and South Western Railway. The LSWR then extended the line east to Fareham in 1889.

From 1900 a branch from the station conveyed patients to the nearby Netley Hospital. Heavy casualties during the First World War resulted in the station being for a time the third-busiest in Britain.

== Services ==
Almost all services at Netley are operated by South Western Railway using Class 450 EMUs. Southern also provide a small number of additional services, which are operated using Class 377 or Class 387 EMUs

The typical off-peak service is one train per hour in each direction between Portsmouth & Southsea and Southampton Central. Additional services call at the station during the peak hours, including two services (one in the morning and one in the evening) to Southampton Central operated by Southern, one originating from Littlehampton and the other from Brighton.

Preceding station	National Rail	Following station
Hamble	South Western Railway West Coastway Line	Sholing
Swanwick	Southern West Coastway Line Limited service	Woolston
