= Sholing =

Suburb of Southampton, England

Coordinates: 50.9001°N 1.3551°W

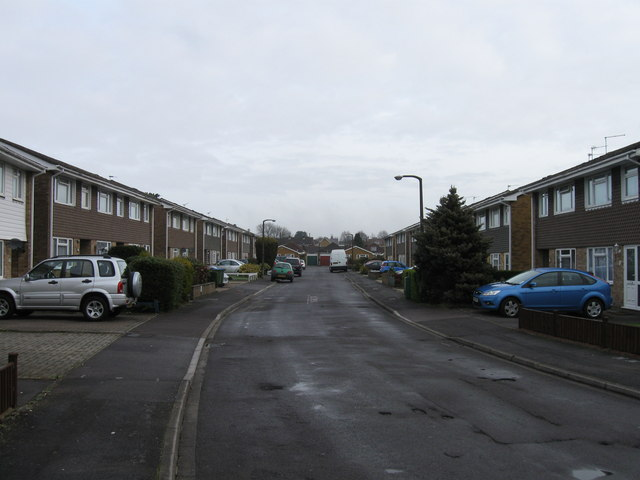
- Kenson Gardens, a typical Sholing street

- Location within Southampton
- Area: 2.95 km^{2} (1.14 sq mi)
- Population: 14,053
  - Density: 4,764/km^{2} (12,340/sq mi)
- Unitary authority: Southampton
- Ceremonial county: Hampshire
- Region: South East
- Country: England
- Sovereign state: United Kingdom
- Post town: SOUTHAMPTON
- Postcode district: SO19
- Dialling code: 023
- Police: Hampshire and Isle of Wight
- Fire: Hampshire and Isle of Wight
- Ambulance: South Central
- UK Parliament: Southampton Itchen

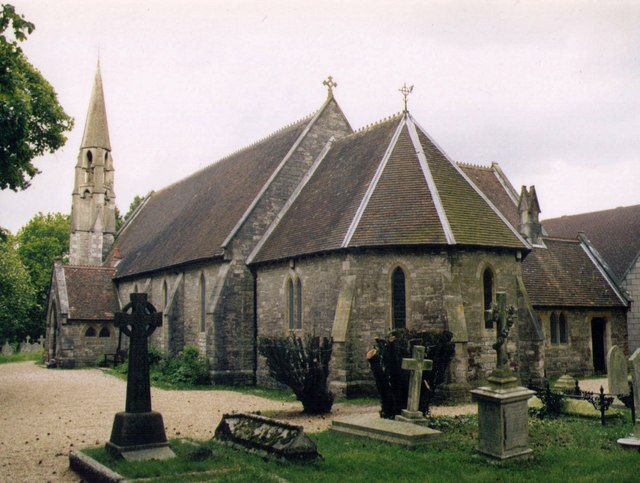
Church of St Mary

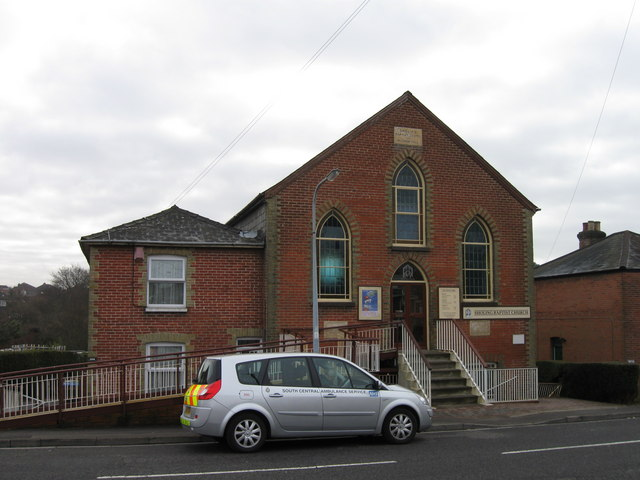
Sholing Baptist Church

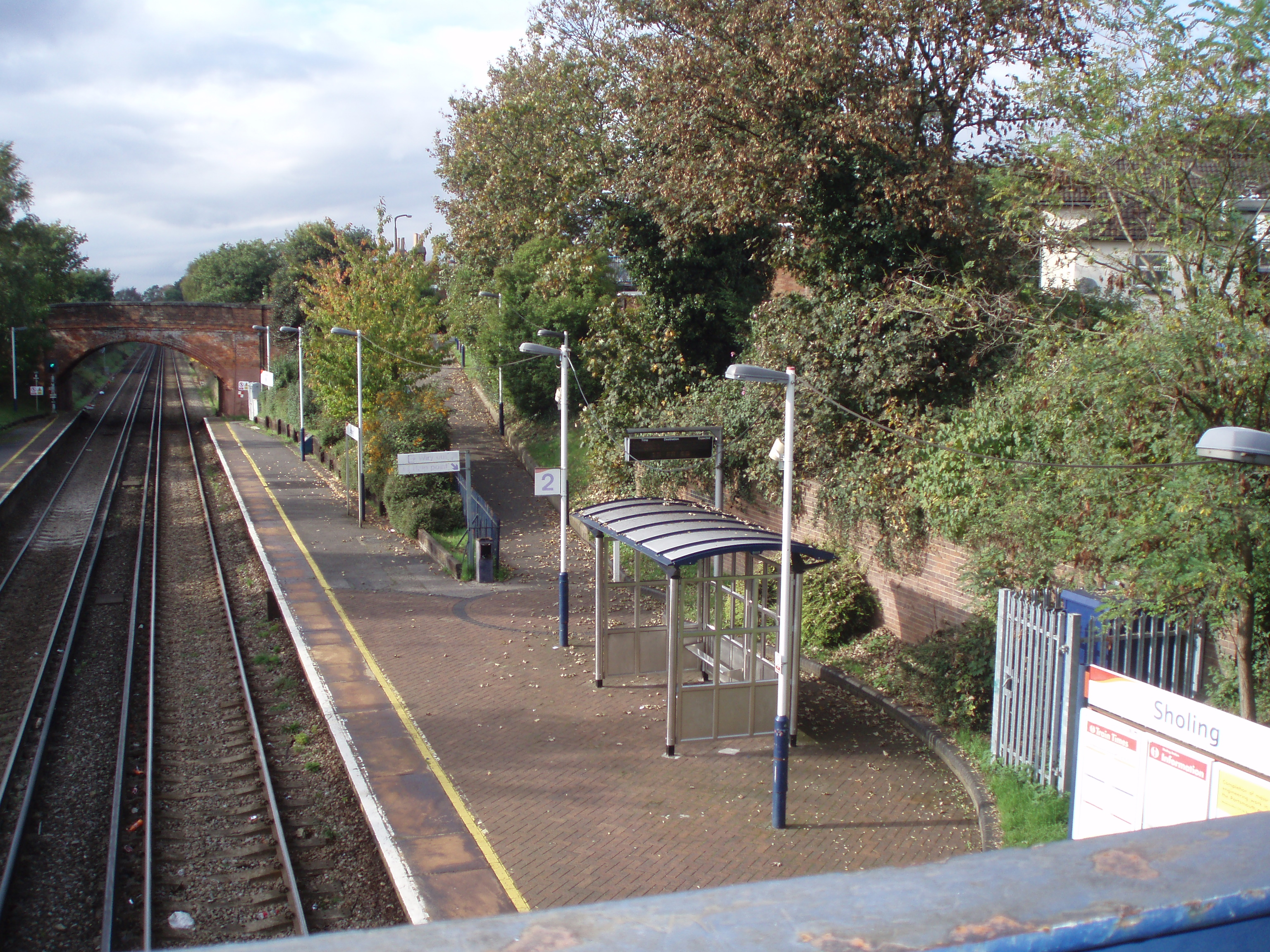
Sholing railway station

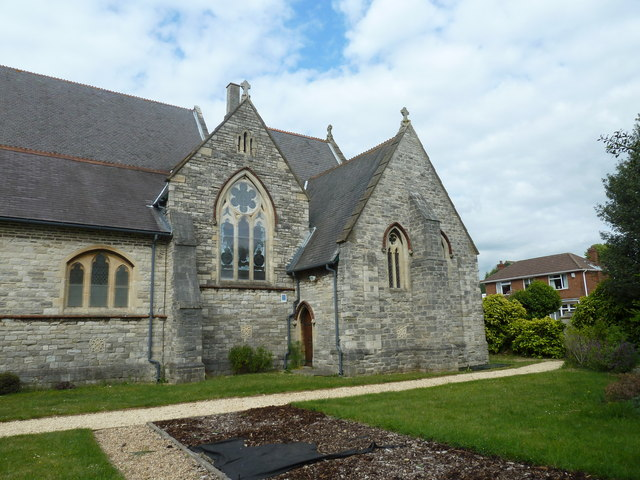
St Mark's Church

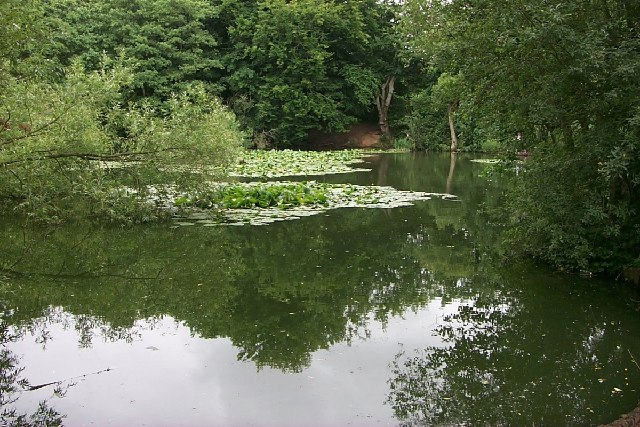
Millers Pond on Sholing Common

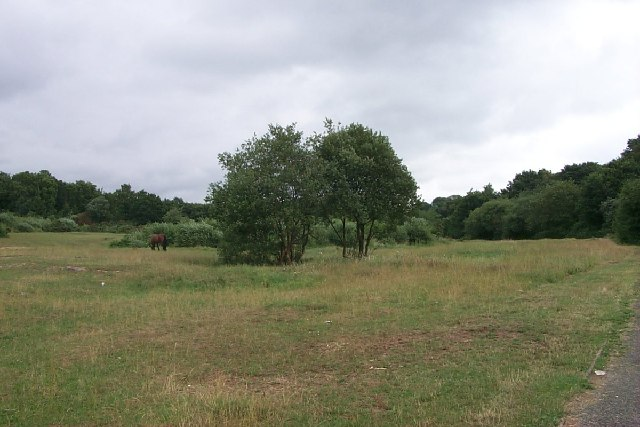
Spike Island, Sholing Common

Sholing, previously Scholing, is a suburb on the eastern side of the city of Southampton, in the ceremonial county of Hampshire, England. It is located between the districts of Bitterne, Thornhill and Woolston.

Various explanations from where the name derives but the most popular is that "Sholing" derives from the Anglo-Saxon phrase for "hill on the shore."

The parish church for Sholing, St Mary's, was opened in 1866. The first Vicar, the Rev. Francis Davidson, (the father of the "Rector of Stiffkey" Harold Davidson) remained in place for the first 48 years.

== Governance ==
Sholing was formerly a tything and chapelry in the parish of Hound, in 1894 Sholing became a separate civil parish, on 26 March 1903 the parish was abolished to form Itchen. In 1901 the parish had a population of 5277. In 1920, the village became part of the Borough of Southampton.

Sholing has a railway station, opened in 1866, which connects the area to Southampton and Portsmouth.

== History ==
=== Toponymy ===
There are various explanations for the origin of the name 'Sholing', spelt 'Scholing' on many old maps. One version is that it means, in Old English, 'the hill above the shore' or 'the hill sloping down to the shore' and it is true that Sholing is indeed on high ground and slopes down towards Southampton Water. However, others think that the ending 'ing' indicates an area where the sons of a man named "Schol" lived. The Old English 'Scēolingas' means 'people associated with somebody called 'Scēolh', a nickname for somebody who was crooked or squint-eyed. Another local Romany explanation is that it comes from the presence of the heather 'ling' when it was mentioned that the area had a 'nice show o' ling"'.

The name of the area could also possibly come from the ancient Sceolingas tribe who lived somewhere in this part of Hampshire.

The area has been named locally by some as 'Spike Island'. The explanations include that it originates from the heathland's characteristic spiky gorse that still springs up whenever open land is left unattended. Another is that it stems from the spikes that secured the chains of convicts held in the area prior to being transported to Australia. Another explanation is linked to Spike Island, County Cork – a small island off Cork Harbour, Ireland; this was used in the time of Cromwell to hold Irish rebels and in the 19th century deportees were dispatched to Botany Bay in Australia. This detail is than conflated by some with the name 'Botany Bay' and the implied lawlessness of the Traveller and Gypsy inhabitants of Sholing to arrive at Spike Island. There is no 19th century contemporary sources for this Spike Island. 'Botany Bay' is simply a name to imply a remote and inaccessible region, as its Australian namesake, and apart from Hampshire there are examples of Botany Bay in various other counties.

=== Early history ===
Bronze tools have been found east of the River Itchen and there are many burial mounds, or tumuli, in the area. An 1810 map depicts one on Sholing Common. The earliest mention of Sholing, however, is in 1251, when Henry III granted it to the Abbot of Netley Abbey. Another reference to it is contained in the Register of the nearby Priory Church of St Andrew, Hamble, where, in 1679, it refers to 'Sholin'. A further entry, in 1795, states 'There are two hundred and forty souls in this parish, in Sholing 43, .......' The area was then rather desolate, mainly gorse land and heather, and was part of the Parish of Hound, which also included nearby Hamble and Bursledon. The undeveloped Sholing Common was used as a holding area for troops awaiting embarkation in the late 18th and early 19th century wars with France. It was home to a Volunteer Rifle Range in the 1880s, recalled in the local road names of Butts Road, Dragoon Close, Shooters Hill Close and the local public house, 'The Target'.

Several factors contributed to changing the character of the small country villages east of the Itchen, the first being the inauguration of the Floating Bridges across the River Itchen in 1836, coupled with the construction of Southampton Docks in 1840. The resultant creation of the road to Portsmouth made the entire district more accessible, adjoining, as it did, the Woolston and Itchen areas. The latter had become fashionable for the gentry, who wanted to get away from the rapidly developing industrial area of Southampton and live in the nearby countryside.

Sholing never existed as a village but a small hamlet of brick bungalow type cottages were built in the 1790s in the Botany Bay Road area. The first inhabitants were poor and of Romany background. Many of them retained their caravans and they formed their own tight-knit community, one that continues to this day. These gypsy families would spend the winter in houses, with their caravans in the garden, and travel away in summer hop picking or fruit picking. The men would also race their horses on the local roads during their regular horse sales, to the great pleasure of the villagers and extreme frustration of the local police, who rarely managed to outwit the frantic riders.

The opening of Netley Hospital in 1863 also created a need for housing for the hospital staff, and many came to live in Sholing, together with the servants and tradesmen who served the gentry. Buildings and new roads spread throughout the area and the new residents' spiritual needs were soon served by a Primitive Methodist Chapel, erected in 1856 at a cost of £106 and capable of seating 120 persons.

Sholing was ideal territory for the predominantly working-class dissenting Primitive Methodists at this time, with its high proportion of labourers. The main local industries were brick making, well digging (with everybody either owning or sharing a well), and strawberry growing. There were six brickyards scattered about the area, their presence revealed at night by the fires glowing in the kilns and clamps. Many inhabitants were in service, went to sea as stokers or stewards, or laboured in the docks, and their wives frequently took in laundry, often working together. Donkeys were a common form of transport for the numerous laundries and for the pedlars who carried out a thriving trade in the district. This gave rise to yet another nickname for the area, 'Donkey Common'!

The established church soon followed and the Parish Church of St Mary was consecrated in 1866. It is noteworthy that their first Vicar, the Rev. Francis Davidson, remained in place for the next 48 years. Not to be outdone, the Primitive Methodists' growing popularity was demonstrated by the building of an impressive new Chapel in nearby South-East Road in 1876. It soon became known as 'Green's Chapel', George Green being the most dynamic and forceful leading member of their congregation. The only known education in the area at that time was in a National School, Sholing Common, on the site of what is now the Salvation Army Hall, North-East Road, with children of all ages crowded into one classroom.

However, this improved when the National School for Girls and Infants was built in 1871, Sholing having increased to 1,444 inhabitants. It was directly opposite Sholing Church, in what was then Church Road, now St Monica Road. New buildings for 219 boys were also constructed in 1885 in Middle Road, and Sholing Infants School was built nearby in 1911. The following year the girls and infants of St Monica Road School exchanged premises with the boys of Middle Road and St Monica became a Boys School. Following a number of temporary changes during the Second World War, a new Junior School was built in St Monica Road in 1977 and the original building reverted to an Infants School.

=== Twentieth century ===
Around the start of the 20th century Sholing was surrounded by five toll gates, the Floating Bridge; Northam Bridge; Lances Hill, Hedge End and Bursledon Bridge. The only toll free exit meant a journey through Bitterne via Mousehole to the free Cobden Bridge and this tended to make Sholing a rather isolated community.

However, in 1898 the Parishes of St Mary Extra, Sholing and Hound were formed into Itchen Urban District, and this in turn was absorbed into the County Borough of Southampton in 1920, together with Bitterne and other areas east of the Itchen. The combined population of Bitterne and Sholing was then just under 10,000. This meant profound changes to the nature of all these areas, transforming their deeply entrenched rural attitudes.

A small railway station had been provided at the junction of Station Road and Cranbury Road in August 1866, with a single line, doubled in 1910 and with longer platforms. This proved to be of great value to the many local strawberry growers, market gardeners and brick makers and helped the area to prosper. Further business opportunities were created, such as Mr Darley's basket works in Spring Road, opposite Cranbury Road. This employed as many as fifty young women making baskets for the local fruit growers.

The railway line ran from Southampton to Fareham and on to Portsmouth, and this greatly improved their trading opportunities. Sholing Station has been unstaffed since 1965 and in 1990 the old vandalised buildings were demolished and replaced by a waiting shelter.

Sholing did not suffer extensive damage during World War II, although a number of houses were struck and a train standing between Sholing and Woolston received a direct hit, causing nine casualties. It was also the recipient of Southampton's first flying bomb, above the top of North East Road on 12 July 1944, although there were no fatal casualties.

Extensive post war council development was carried out, arising out of the urgent need to house the hundreds made homeless when large areas of the town were devastated during the many heavy 'blitzes'. Council estates were developed between North East and Kathleen Roads and between Butts Road and Botley Road, transforming the former gravel pits, brickyards and market gardens into widespread residential areas.

Building a new Sholing Girls School in Middle Road started in 1938, but because of wartime problems in obtaining building materials, and the evacuation of pupils, it was not taken into use until July 1945. During the war the girls were temporarily based in the nearby Merry Oak Boys School, built in 1935, as well as in St Monica Road Boys School. Sholing Girls School completed its transition to a specialist College of Technology with an official ceremony in May 2003. This school is in the vanguard of advanced information technology, with sophisticated computer networking, wireless computers, laptops, video conferencing and interactive whiteboards.

Middle Road is also home to Itchen College, which started life in 1906 as a Pupil Teacher's Centre in Woolston. It later became Itchen Co-educational Secondary School and the transfer of the main body of the school to temporary huts on this Middle Road site took place in 1921, with the remainder using Station Road Elementary School. The foundation stone for the present building was laid in December 1925 but many factors, including a major fire, meant that it was not fully completed until 1938. During the Second World War many pupils were evacuated to combine with Andover Grammar School and the school buildings were used as an ARP Post, and Casualty Station with Medical Services. In June 1940 French troops who escaped from Dunkirk were given tea and sandwiches by the WVS from the window of the Domestic Science room, but a British Restaurant was later established in the school dining hall. The school became Itchen Grammar School in September 1946 and it is now known simply as Itchen College.

In 1961 the scenic area of Miller's Pond, in the southwest corner of Sholing, was scheduled for largescale development. The plans incorporated seven hundred houses, a new school, library and a shopping centre, but although the pond was culverted in 1965 the plans never came to fruition. It is now home to the Sholing Valley Study Centre, a voluntary environmental group with an interest in the local wildlife. The area was designated as a Local Nature Reserve in 2011 and now actively managed by the Study Centre.

There are various convenience stores and retail outlets in Sholing including Tesco Express, a Co-operative Food and the video library/gaming store Sholing Video, as well as various take-away restaurants.

== Sport and leisure ==
Sholing F.C. have been the local football team since 1894. Formerly known as Thornycrofts (Woolston) FC and from 1960 as Vosper Thornycroft FC (VTFC), the side changed their name to Sholing FC in 2010. Their nickname is The Boatmen.

== In popular culture ==
Below is an excerpt from James Brown's book The Illustrated History of Southampton's Suburbs:

Traces of its original rural nature have been retained through the network of Greenways established by the City Council since 1983. The three and a half-mile long Shoreburs Greenway, from Weston Shore to Bursledon Road, runs through Sholing, with two routes linking at Miller's Pond, now a local nature reserve and managed by a local community group. One runs between Middle Road and North-east Road, and the other between Kathleen Road and Butts Road. They are 'ribbons of open space which follow stream valleys' and preserve wildlife habitats. Sholing is fortunate to have these reminders of its rural past and long may they be retained.

== Historic dates ==
c. 6000 BC: Ice Age ends. Floods cut off Britain from Europe, the Isle of Wight from Britain, and make Southampton Water from Solent Valley. The Sholing Valleys, formerly quite small, become a large marshy area when the Solent floods.

50: Romans found Clausentum (Bitterne). The Roman road from Bitterne to Chichester runs through the future Sholing; possibly Sholing Road, which runs beside the Veracity park, is built over it.

495: Cerdic, a Jutish prince, lands near Totton and founds the Gewissan kingdom. This tiny statelet will one day grow to become England.

c. 500: Cerdic takes Clausentum (Bitterne), which is then abandoned.

c.510: Probable founding of royal estate of Hamtun at St. Mary's.

534: Death of Cerdic. His territories later becomes Hamtunscir. Hamtun has about 150 people.

980: Southampton raided by Vikings. Town gradually moves from St. Mary's to modern site.

c.990: Viking settlement at Ulfston (Woolston).

1086: The Domesday Book records two Eastside settlements at Olvestune (Woolston) and Latelei (Netley). Bitterne was probably also settled by this time.

c. 1300: Probable beginning of Weston Mill, in what is now Mayfield Park. Miller's Pond takes its name from this building.

1537: Henry VIII closes Netley Abbey (Dissolution of the Monasteries).

1610: A Stuart map of the area shows a flooded valley surrounded by a marsh.

1770: First official mention of the mill at Weston when one Walter Taylor rents it to make rigging blocks for ships – including a certain HMS Victory.

1781: Finding the power of the stream insufficient, Taylor moves his operation upstream to Woodmill.

1791: Another map of the area shows it almost deserted.

1821: The Eastside villages, Bitterne, Sholing and Woolston, are incorporated into Southampton. A few people live in Sholing.

1839–40: Docks and Southampton-London railway built; steamboats to many parts of the British Empire. Southampton's growth begins to accelerate, as does Sholing's.

1866: Sholing Station opened on the Southampton to Netley Hospital Railway (the line had been built the previous year). Portsmouth Road diverted slightly, and Miller's Pond reduced at its southern end by the new embankment.

1867: Sholing Church (St. Mary's) built in Victorian style (i.e. a mess). Sholing parish created out of the parishes of St. Mary Extra and Hound.

1871: A population survey shows Sholing has 1,444 people living there.

1875: Maps show an alternative spelling, Scholing.

1889: Railway extended to Fareham and Portsmouth.

1890: First mention of the brickyard (probably much older) on Brickyard Hill (now upper Station Road). The first area of Sholing to be heavily urbanised, this today has become the last green area.

1930s: Sholing Brick Company ceases operations.

1940: Battle of Britain. Woolston a prime target due to Spitfire factory. Sholing gets a battering.

1975: First of three major hikes in rent for the Southampton Model Railway Society, based in Sholing Station. These will eventually force it to quit in 1986.

1977: Itchen Toll Bridge opens, replacing the old floating bridge. Direct road access to the City Centre.

1978: Miller's Pond partly restored.

1983: Work starts on the oddly-named "Shoreburs Greenway", connecting the two valleys to the Solent Way footpath.

1988: Sholing Valleys Study centre opens. British Rail pulls down the buildings on Sholing Station and replaces them with two bus-shelters.

1993: Sholing Sports FC forced to close – its owners want to sell the ground for building.

2005: Loss of Sholing Station Post Office, leaving just the main post office and the small one on the border with Thornhill

2008: Both remaining post offices close.

2010: Vosper Thornycroft F.C. change their name to Sholing F.C. to attract new investment and to better suit the area in which the club is based.

2014: Sholing F.C. make it through to the final of the FA Carlsberg Vase at Wembley
