= Sholing railway station =

Station serving the suburb of Sholing, on the edge of Southampton, England

Coordinates: 50.897°N 1.364°W

Sholing
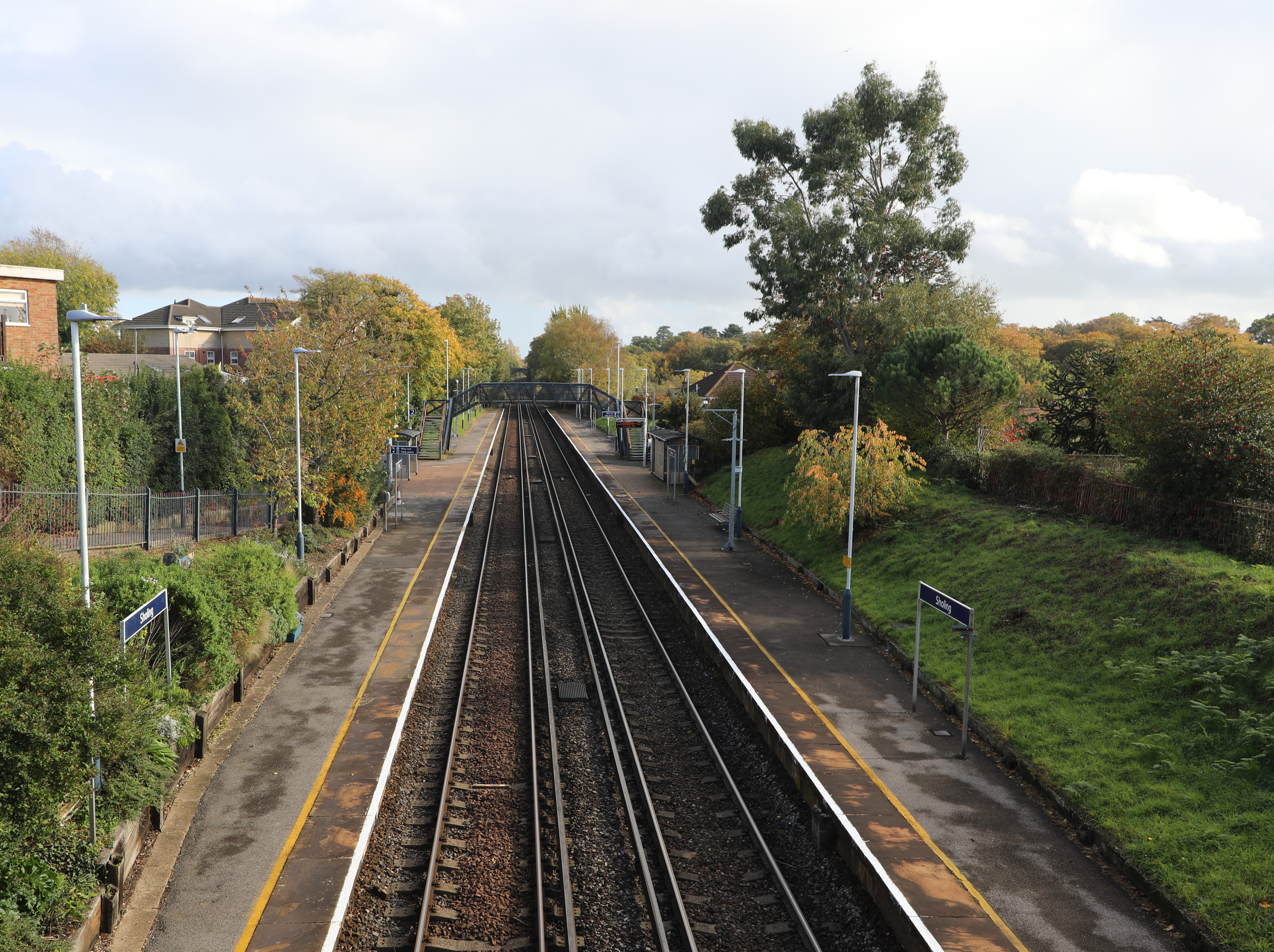

General information
- Location: Sholing, Southampton; England
- Grid reference: SU447109
- Managed by: South Western Railway
- Platforms: 2

Other information
- Station code: SHO
- Classification: DfT category F2

History
- Opened: 1 August 1866
- Original company: London and South Western Railway
- Pre-grouping: London and South Western Railway
- Post-grouping: Southern Railway

Passengers
- 2020/21: ▼35,736
- 2021/22: ▲73,474
- 2022/23: ▲86,890
- 2023/24: ▲87,902
- 2024/25: ▲90,740
Location
Notes
- Passenger statistics from the Office of Rail and Road

Sholing railway station is a railway station serving the suburb of Sholing, on the edge of Southampton, England, operated by South Western Railway. It is the finishing point of the Itchen Way, a 32-mile long-distance footpath. The station is located in eastern Southampton - it is also the penultimate station on this branch line to be within Southampton limits.

== Upgrades ==
In 2009 the station had stairs replaced and new CCTV cameras fitted. This followed an incident where a male fell down the stairs on Platform 2, breaking his leg.

Local campaigns have sought to see additional shelters installed at the station following increased usage which has doubled over the last six years.

== Services ==
All services at Sholing are operated by South Western Railway using Class 450 EMUs.

The typical off-peak service is one train per hour in each direction between Portsmouth & Southsea and Southampton Central. Additional services call at the station during the peak hours.

Preceding station	National Rail	Following station
Netley	South Western Railway West Coastway Line	Woolston

== Gallery ==
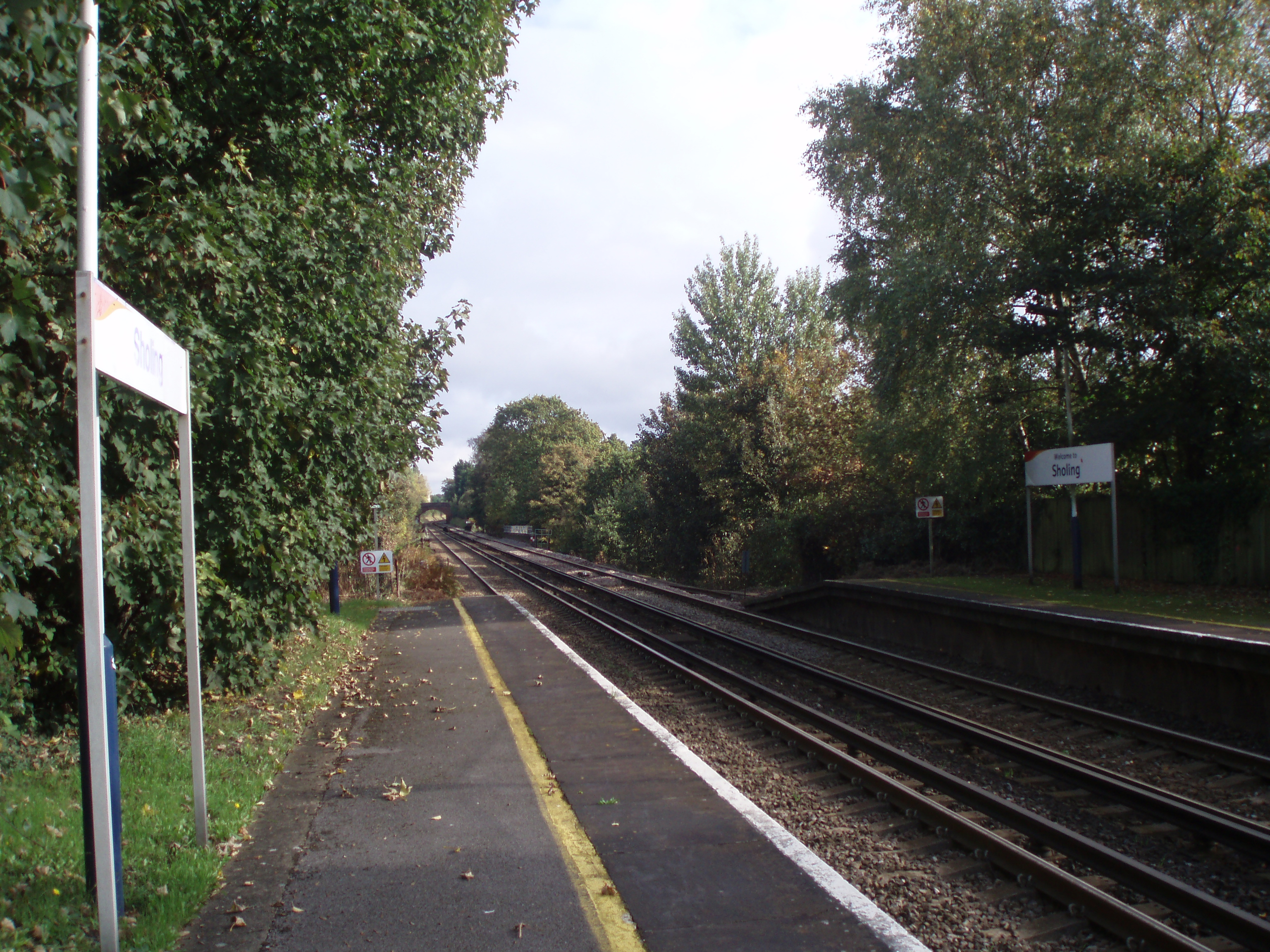

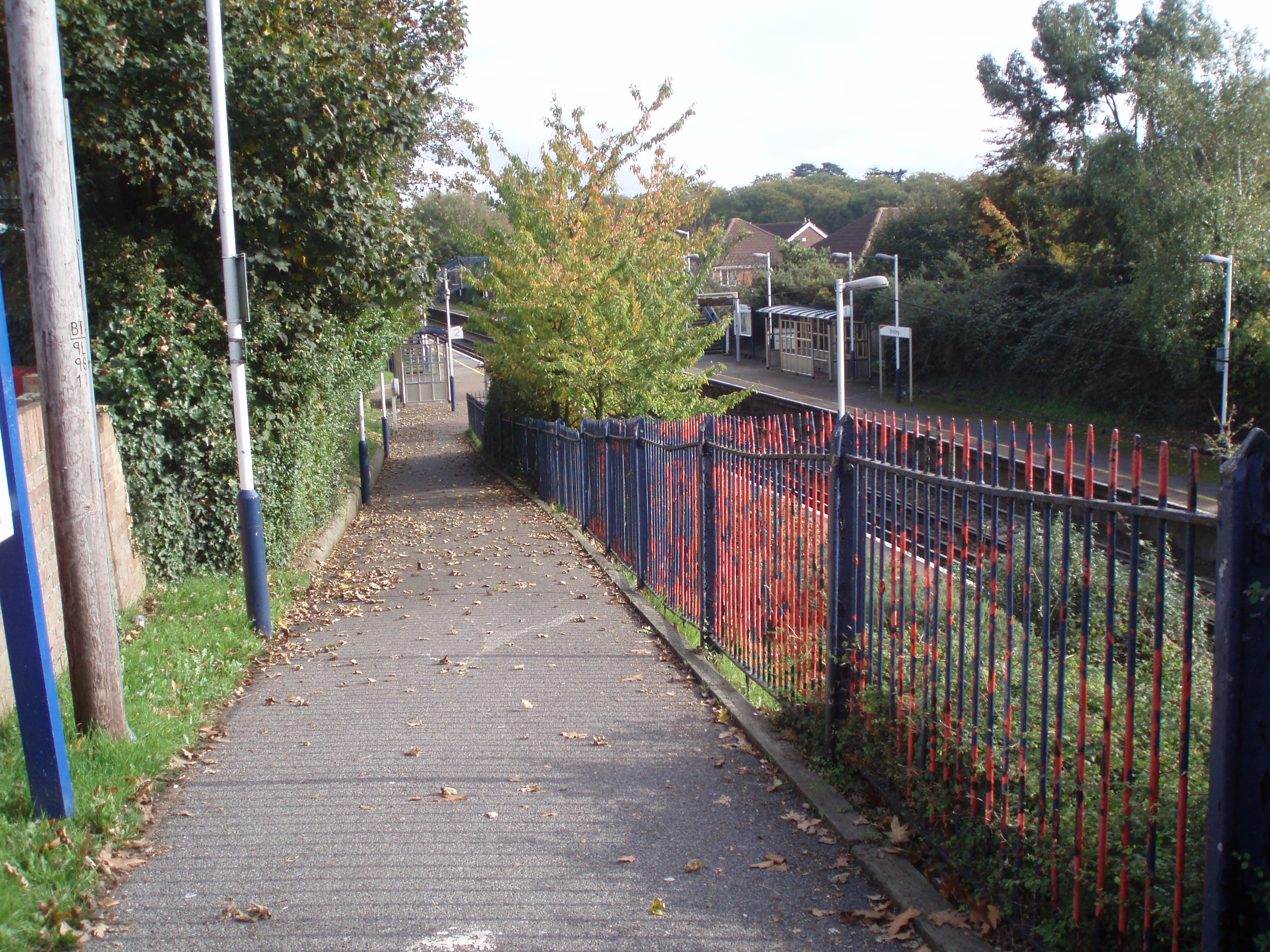
