= Netley Hospital =

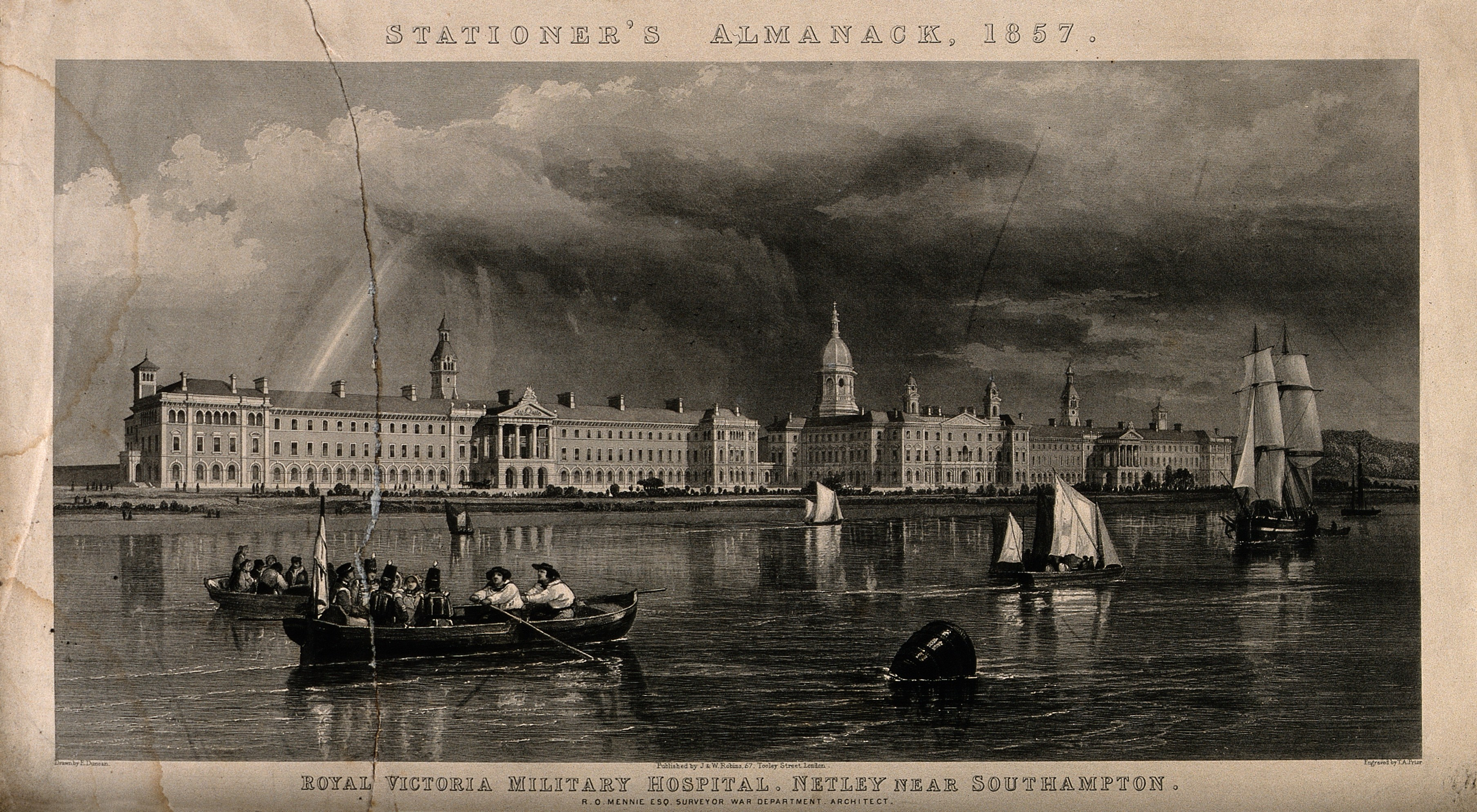
- Line engraving of Royal Victoria Military Hospital from Southampton Water produced by T. A. Prior in 1857

- Shown in Hampshire

Geography
- Location: Netley, England, United Kingdom
- Coordinates: 50°51′59.73″N 1°20′30.29″W

Organisation
- Care system: Public NHS
- Type: Public

Services
- Emergency department: No Accident & Emergency

History
- Founded: 1856
- Closed: 1978

Links
- Lists: Hospitals in England

The Royal Victoria Hospital or Netley Hospital was a large military hospital in Netley, near Southampton, Hampshire, England. Construction started in 1856 at the suggestion of Queen Victoria but its design caused some controversy, chiefly from Florence Nightingale. Often visited by Queen Victoria, the hospital was extensively used during the First World War. It became the 28th US General Hospital during the invasion of mainland Europe in the Second World War. The main building – the world's longest building when it was completed – was entirely demolished in 1966, except for the chapel and former YMCA building, which still survive. The extensive outbuildings, which once occupied a vast acreage of land to the rear of the main building, finally succumbed in 1978. The site of the hospital can be seen and explored in Royal Victoria Country Park. The site had a railway station, which was connected by the Netley Hospital Branch Line.

The hospital was situated within the larger area of land bounded by the River Itchen and River Hamble, particularly around Sholing that had become known locally as Spike Island. That term was subsequently used by wounded soldiers and prisoners of war to describe the location of the hospital.

== History ==
=== Development ===
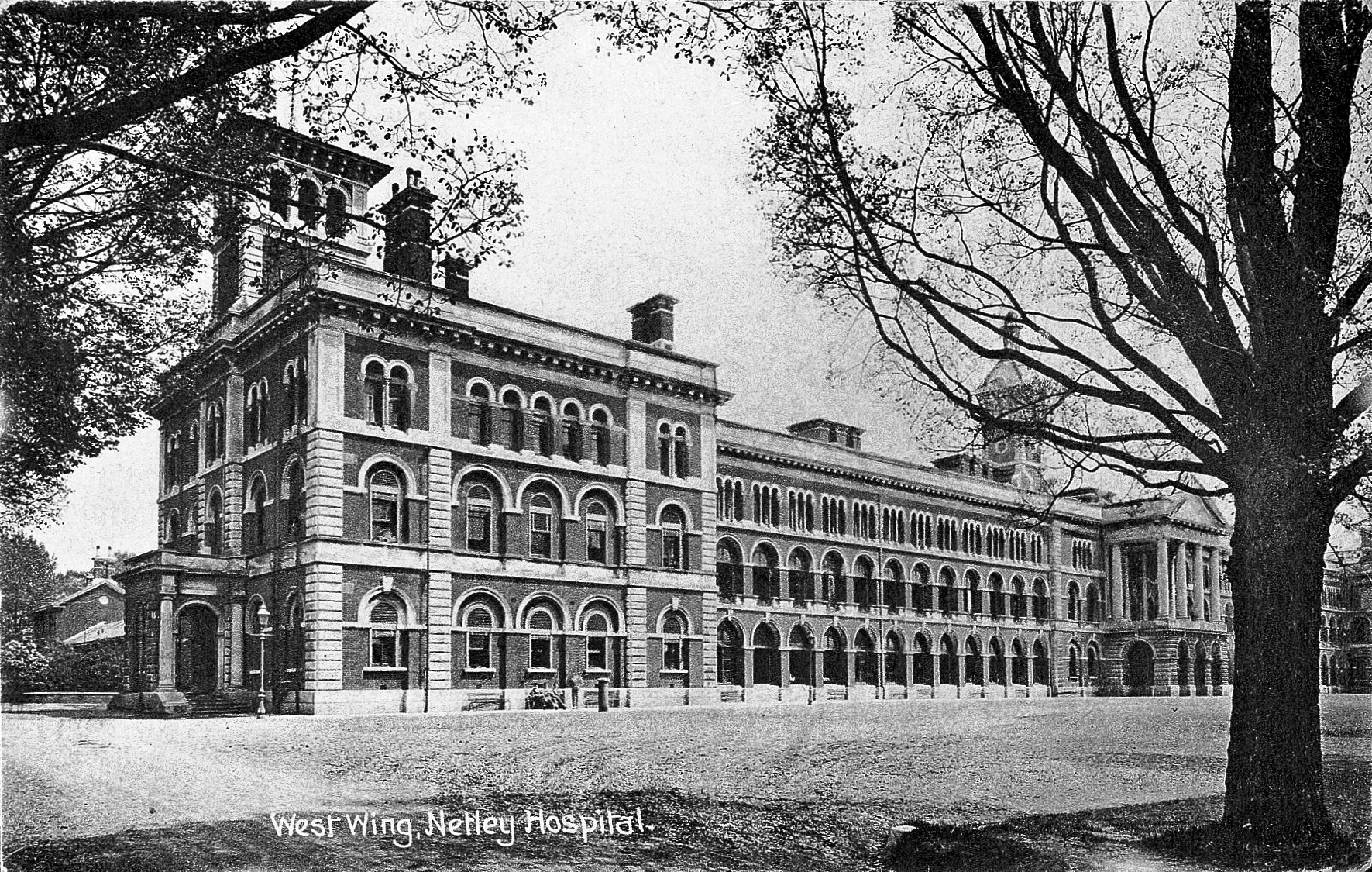
West Wing of the Royal Victoria Hospital

During the Crimean War (1854–1856), news of dreadful conditions in military hospitals in the Crimea caused political concern in England, and contributed to the fall of the government in 1855 due to "Mismanagement of the War". Encouraged by Queen Victoria and aided by the friendship between Florence Nightingale and the new prime minister, Lord Palmerston, the fresh political climate allowed a large military hospital to be planned and constructed.

Netley on the shore of Southampton Water was first suggested as a site for the new hospital by Sir Andrew Smith, and was settled on after the rejection of co-location with the Naval Hospital at Haslar. The board in charge of the project was appointed by Lord Panmure and chaired by Colonel T. O'Brien, the Deputy Quartermaster General, and was to keep closely in touch with Smith to ensure that the views of medical officers on the design were respected. 109 acres (0.44 km^{2}) of land was purchased from Thomas Chamberlayne's Netley Grange Estate on 3 January 1856. Later that year, developing plans meant that further land was required, which was compulsorily purchased from Chamberlayne. Queen Victoria laid the foundation stone on 19 May 1856, concealing underneath a copy of the plans, the first Victoria Cross, a Crimea Medal and coins of the realm. The inscription read:

This stone was laid on the 19th day of May in the year of our Lord 1856, by Her Most Gracious Majesty Victoria, Queen of Great Britain and Ireland as the foundation stone of the Victoria Military Hospital intended for the reception of the sick and invalid soldiers of her Army

Some confusion was caused by the publication in The Builder of unrevised plans for the hospital. Moreover, the influential Florence Nightingale, still busy in Crimea, was not involved in the initial design. On her return, she was able to highlight flaws in the design and politicise them. In January 1857, Prime Minister Lord Palmerston wrote:

It seems to me that at Netley all consideration of what would best tend to the comfort and recovery of the patients has been sacrificed to the vanity of the architect, whose sole object has been to make a building which should cut a dash when looked at from Southampton River. Pray stop all work.

But construction was well under way, and it was too late to change the design significantly. Subsequent reports and enquiries concluded that the design and its location were indeed flawed, though, under the influence of Dr John Sutherland, Nightingale eventually expressed approval for the plans.

The hospital eventually opened for patients on 11 March 1863. It was a quarter of a mile (435 m) long, had 138 wards and approximately 1,000 beds, and was Britain's largest military hospital. It cost £350,000 to build, and was late and over budget. Supporting infrastructure was also built, including a reservoir at Hound Grove and a gasworks In 1863 Nightingale's colleague Jane Catherine Shaw Stewart became the Supervisor of Nurses, but she was there for just five years before an investigation revealed her bullying and temper. She was replaced by Jane Cecilia Deeble who was awarded the Royal Red Cross for her work "in Zululand". Deeble was in charge until 1889 when she was succeeded by Helen Campbell Norman.

A cast iron pier was extended into Southampton Water in 1865, restricted to 560 ft (170 m) in length and not reaching deep water. A railway line connected Netley to Southampton Docks on 5 March 1866. At the suggestion of Queen Victoria, the line was extended into the grounds of the hospital on 18 April 1900. In 1903, an electricity generating station was built.

In 1864, a Portland stone memorial was erected, dedicated to the members of the Army Medical Department who died in the Crimean War.

=== Early use ===
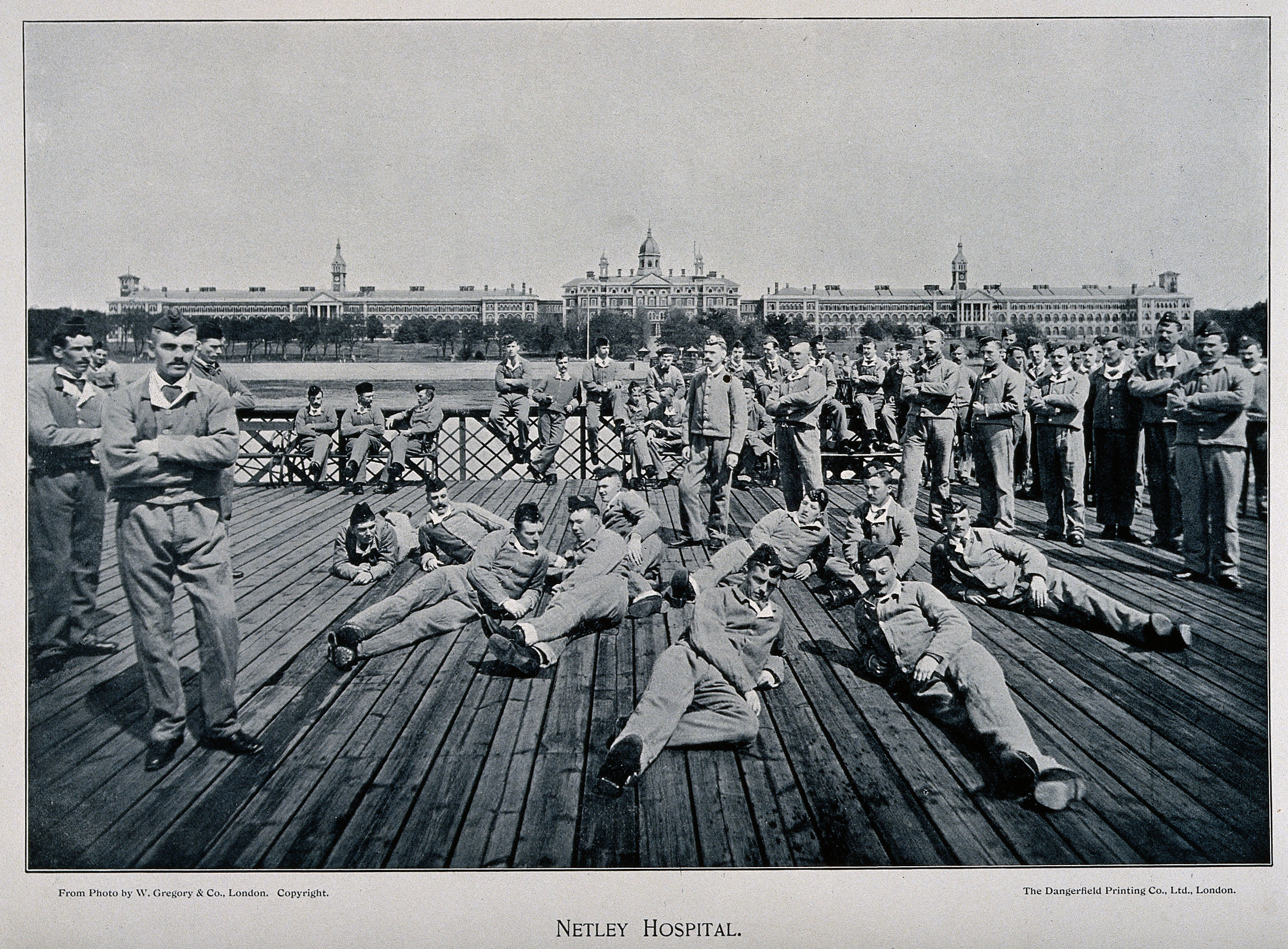
Recuperating Boer War soldiers photographed on the hospital pier (circa 1902)

The building was enormous, grand, and visually attractive, but was neither convenient nor practical. Corridors were on the sea-facing front of the building, leaving the wards facing the inner courtyard with little light and air. Ventilation in general was poor, with unpleasant smells lingering around the vast building. In 1867, journalist Matthew Wallingford paid a visit to the hospital to write a report for the local parish newsletter:

It was a ghastly display of deception to say the least. To the naked eye it is a triumph of modern architecture, but should you inherit the misfortune to be sectioned there, one would not think of the place as so. It is not so much as the greatest military hospital in the world as much as it is a rather impractical waste of government finance.

Early patients arriving from campaigns taking place all over the world during the expansion of the British Empire had an uncomfortable journey to the hospital, either having to be transferred to a shallow-draft boat if landing at the pier, or transported from Netley station to the hospital if arriving by rail.

The hospital was particularly busy during the Second Boer War (1899–1902) which, when the project was further encouraged by Queen Victoria, provided the impetus for extending the railway line. The extension terminated at a station behind the hospital but was awkward to operate, having gradients which were steep for the locomotives of the time. Some trains needed a locomotive at each end to travel that ¾ of a mile.

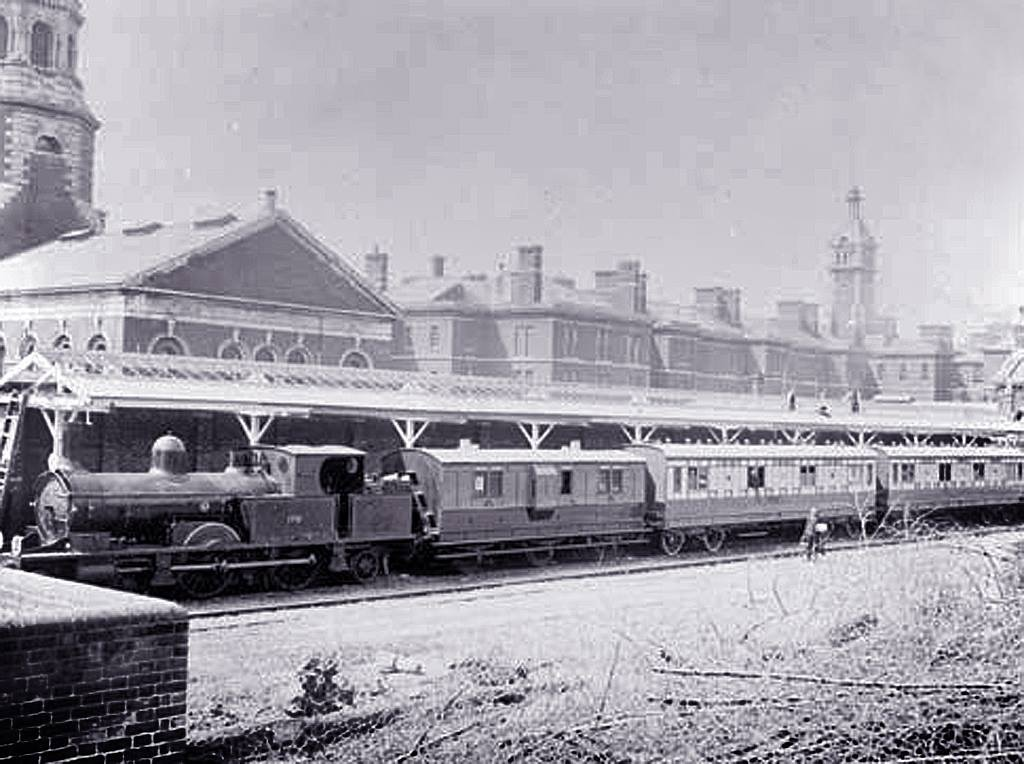
An ambulance train at Netley Hospital's station

The railway and pier were also used for Queen Victoria's frequent visits to the hospital; she often arrived at the pier having been conveyed in the Royal Yacht from her residence on the Isle of Wight, Osborne House. She awarded three Victoria Crosses to patients at the hospital. The Pier's lack of access to deep water meant it ceased to be used for patient transfer after 1901.

From its construction until 1902, Netley Hospital served as the home of the Army Medical School, training civilian doctors for service with the army. In A Study in Scarlet, Dr. Watson recounts his earlier life before meeting Sherlock Holmes; it is established that Watson received his medical degree from the University of London in 1878, and had gone on to train at Netley Hospital as a surgeon in the Army. As many patients were suffering from tropical diseases, the hospital was also used for medical research. The first thing that confronted anyone entering the imposing central tower block was a large museum of natural history and anatomical specimens, reflecting the interests of many of the doctors.

=== World Wars ===
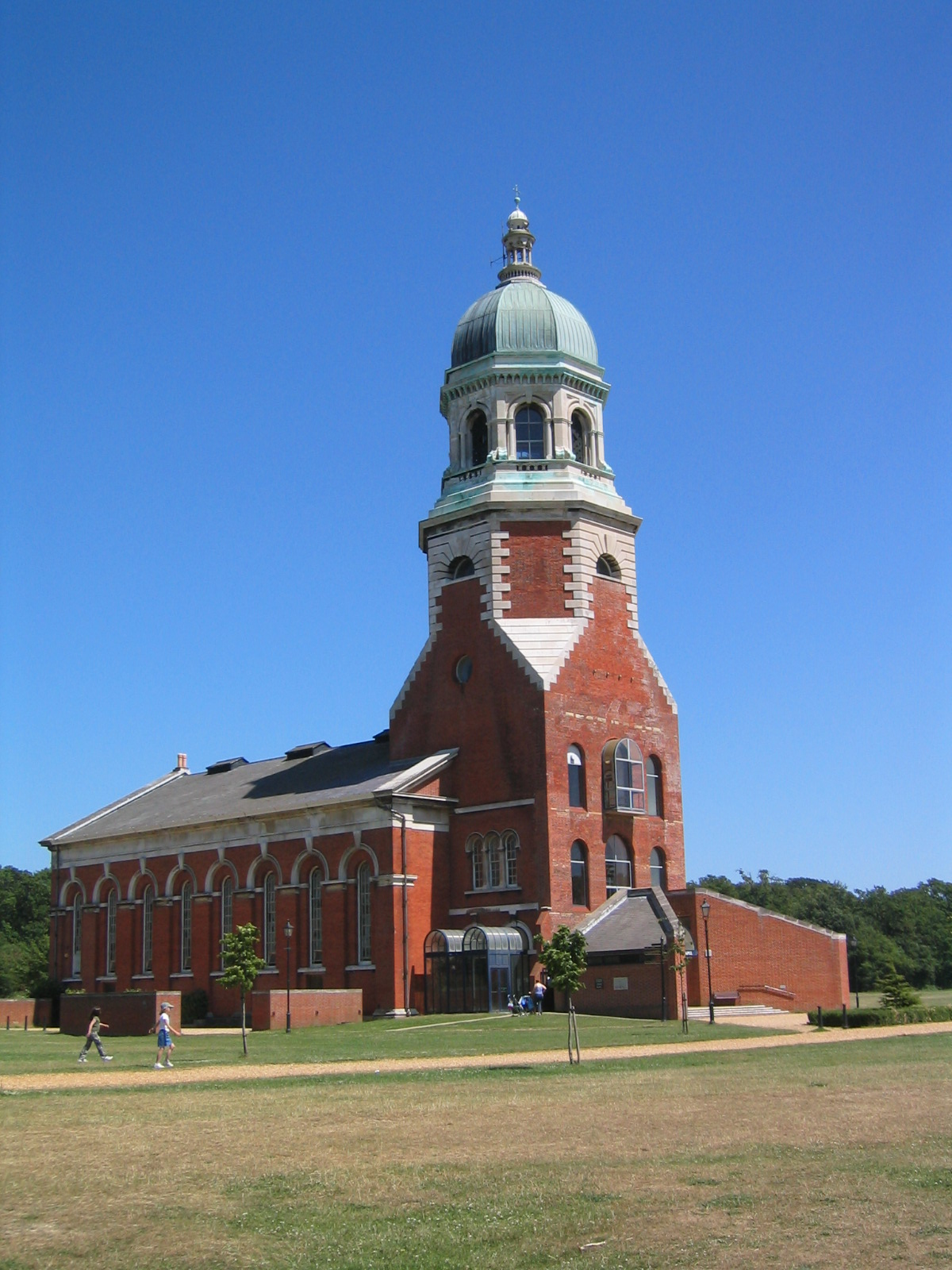
The chapel is all that remains of original hospital structure.

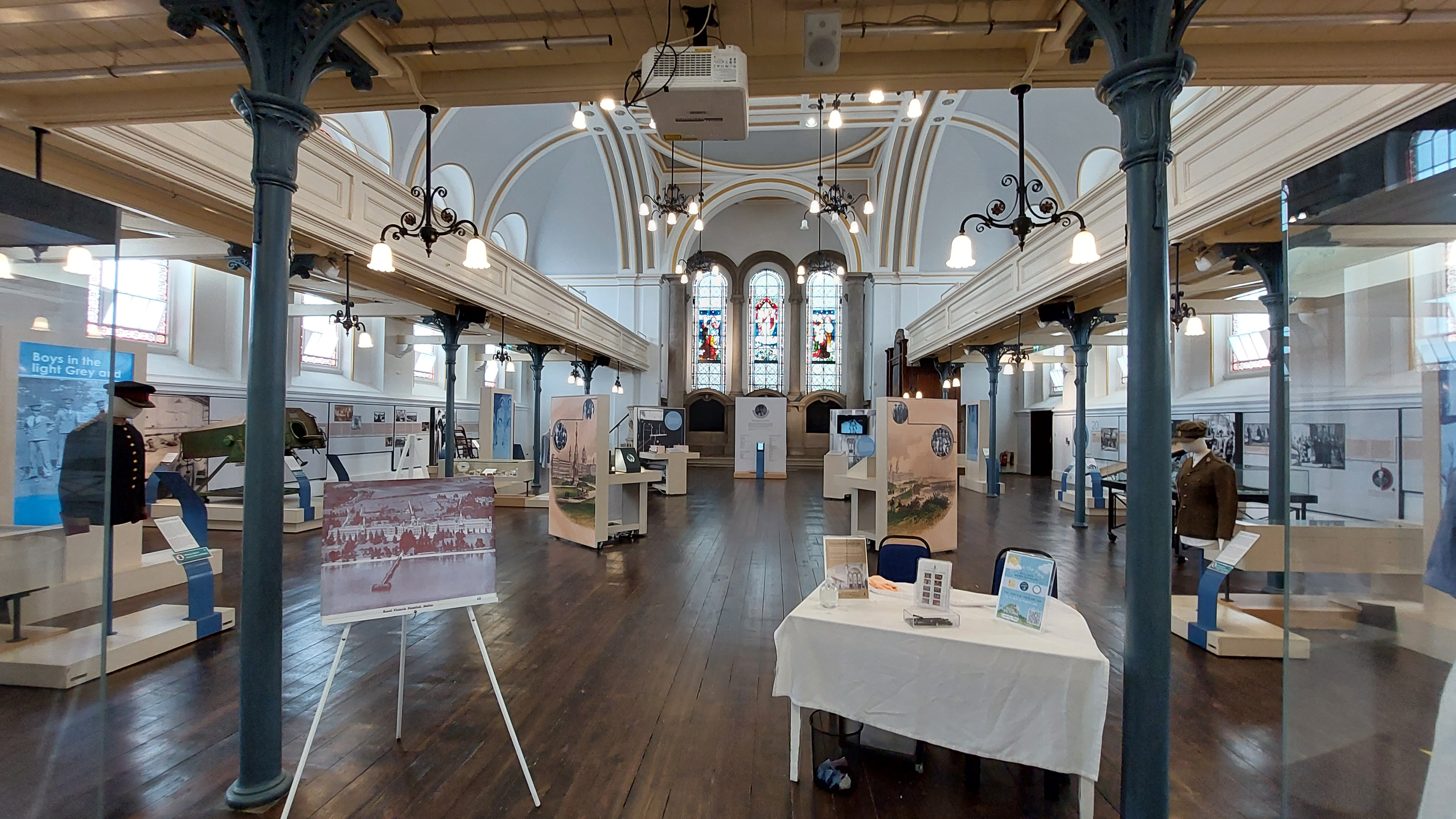
Interior of the hospital chapel serving as a visitor centre

During the First World War, a large Red Cross hutted hospital was built at the rear of the site, which expanded Netley Hospital to accommodate around 2,500 beds. Many of the staff were Red Cross volunteers, as most of the regular staff were overseas. Some 50,000 patients were treated at Netley during the war.

Similar usage was seen during the Second World War, when around 68,000 casualties were treated. In June 1940, French soldiers from Dunkirk were treated here. In 1944, US Forces took over the hospital prior to D-Day.

A break was made in the pier during the Second World War to prevent its use in the event of a German invasion.

=== Decline ===
After the war, the hospital continued to care for some casualties returning from overseas service. It also accommodated some Hungarian refugees in 1956, but due to its high cost of maintenance, it gradually fell into disuse, and the main site closed in 1958. The pier was never repaired and had been demolished by 1955.

In 1963, a large fire damaged much of the building, and it was demolished in 1966, with only the chapel retained. Shortly before its demolition, Jonathan Miller filmed his 1966 version of Alice in Wonderland in the hospital. A ceremony uncovered Queen Victoria's time capsule beneath the foundation stone on 7 December 1966.

At the rear of the site, D Block (Victoria House) and E Block (Albert House) formed the psychiatric hospital. D Block was opened in 1870 as the army's first purpose-built military asylum. These buildings were also used from the 1950s to 1978 to treat Army (and from 1960, Navy) personnel who suffered from sexually transmitted diseases, drug and alcohol problems, and later the Joint Armed Services Psychiatric Unit. The unit moved to the Queen Elizabeth Military Hospital, Woolwich in mid-1978.

The site is now open to the public as the Royal Victoria Country Park. Of the main building, only the hospital chapel remains; it was scheduled for demolition but was saved at the last moment as a monument to the hospital. The chapel was designated as Grade II* listed in 1974.

Some buildings at the rear of the site, including the former asylum, are used as the Hampshire Constabulary Police Training Headquarters. The Officers' Mess survives and is also a listed building. The altar from the Catholic chapel is still in use at the Our Lady of Sorrows and St Philip Benizi church in Fordingbridge.

== See also ==
- List of hospitals in England
