= Royal Victoria Country Park =

Country park in Hampshire, England

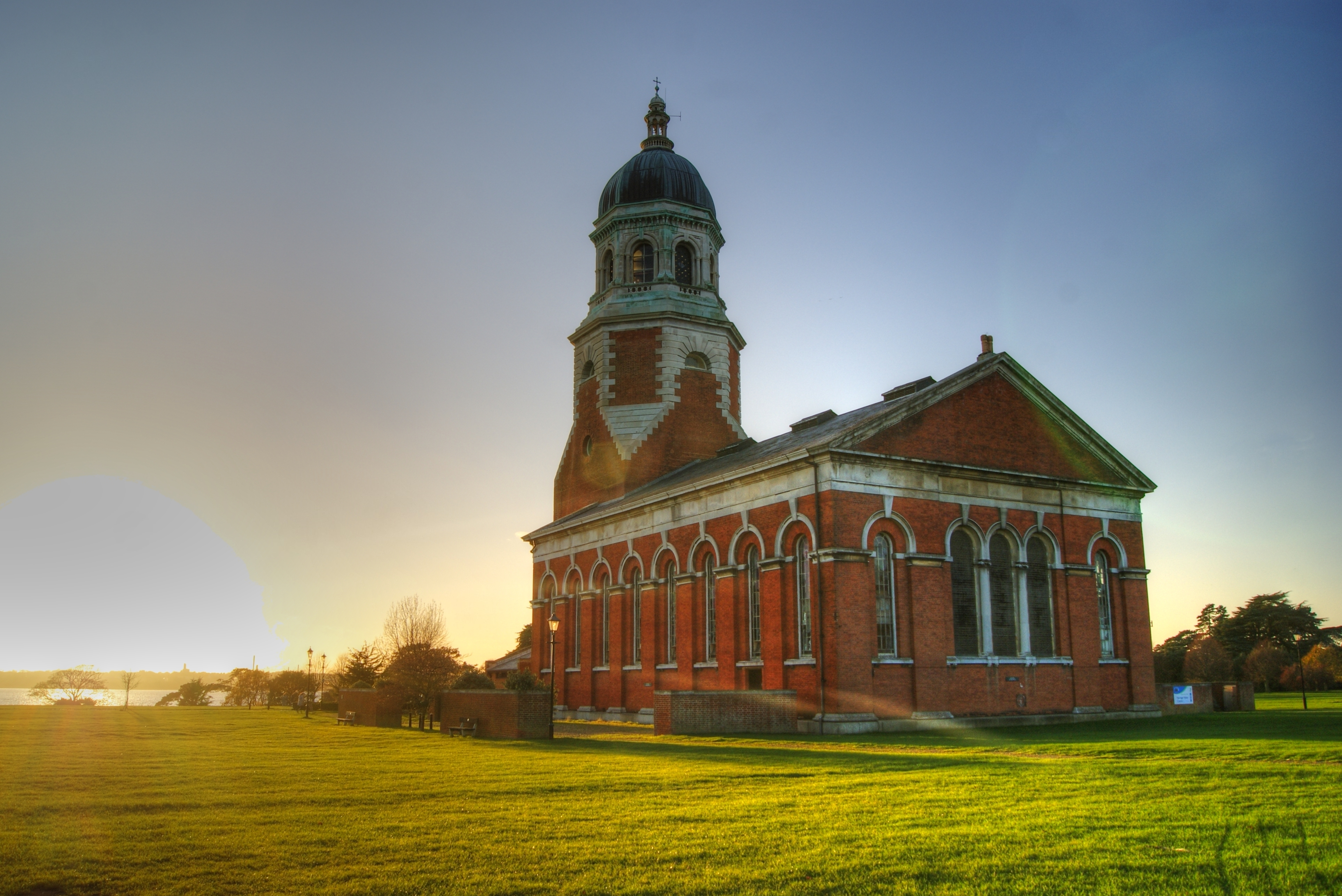
- The Chapel in the centre of the park

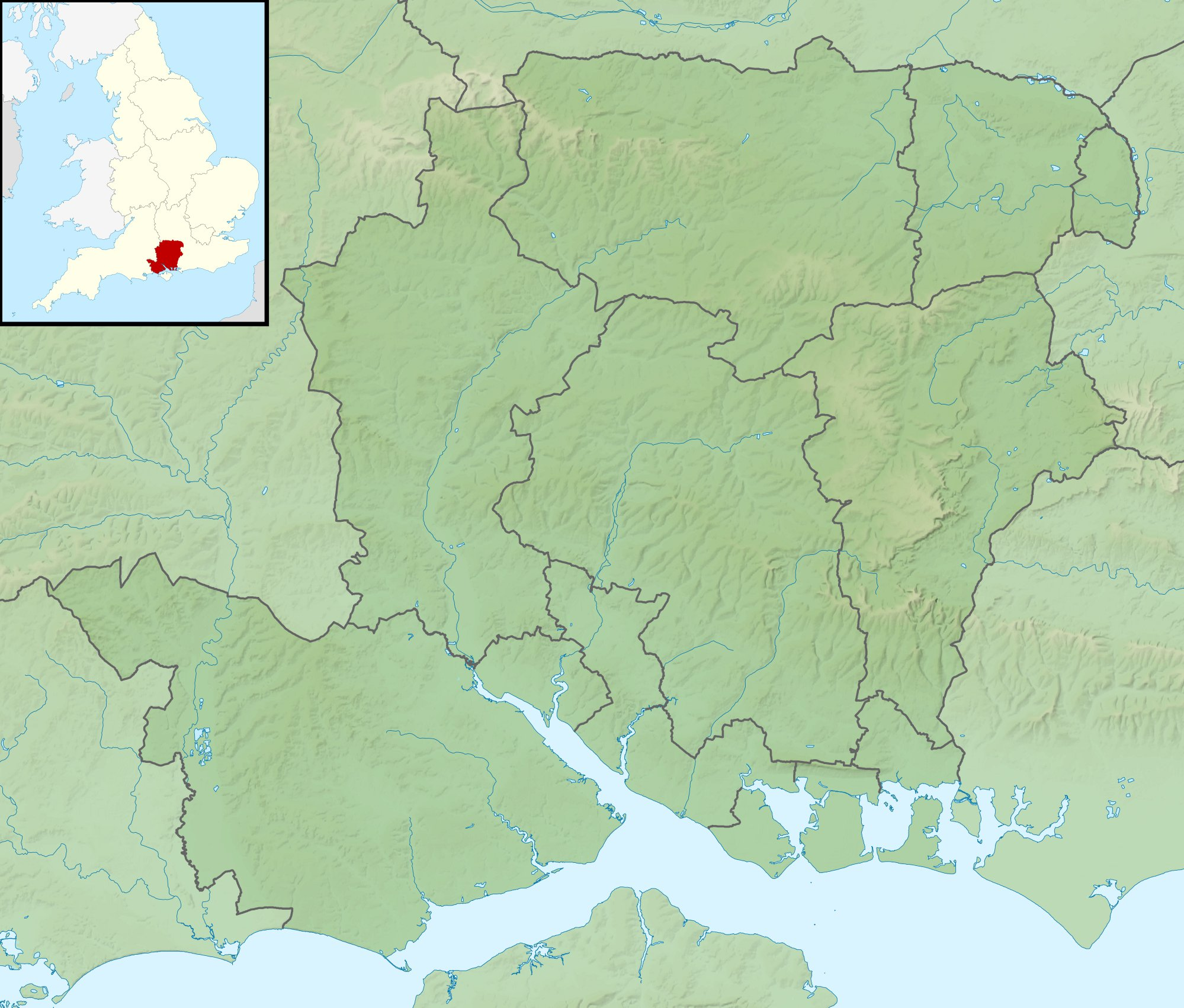
- Location within Hampshire
- Type: Country Park
- Location: Netley, Hampshire, England
- Coordinates: 50°51′59″N 1°20′30″W
- Area: 81 ha (200 acres)
- Created: 1980
- Operator: Hampshire County Council
- Status: Open year-round
- Awards: Green Flag Award
- Paths: Solent Way; England Coast Path; Strawberry Trail; Hamble Rail Trail
- Website: Official website

National Register of Historic Parks and Gardens
- Official name: Royal Victoria Country Park
- Designated: 28 January 2002
- Reference no.: 1001584

Map of Royal Victoria Country Park, with Royal Victoria Railway shown in grey and the Hamble Rail Trail in black.

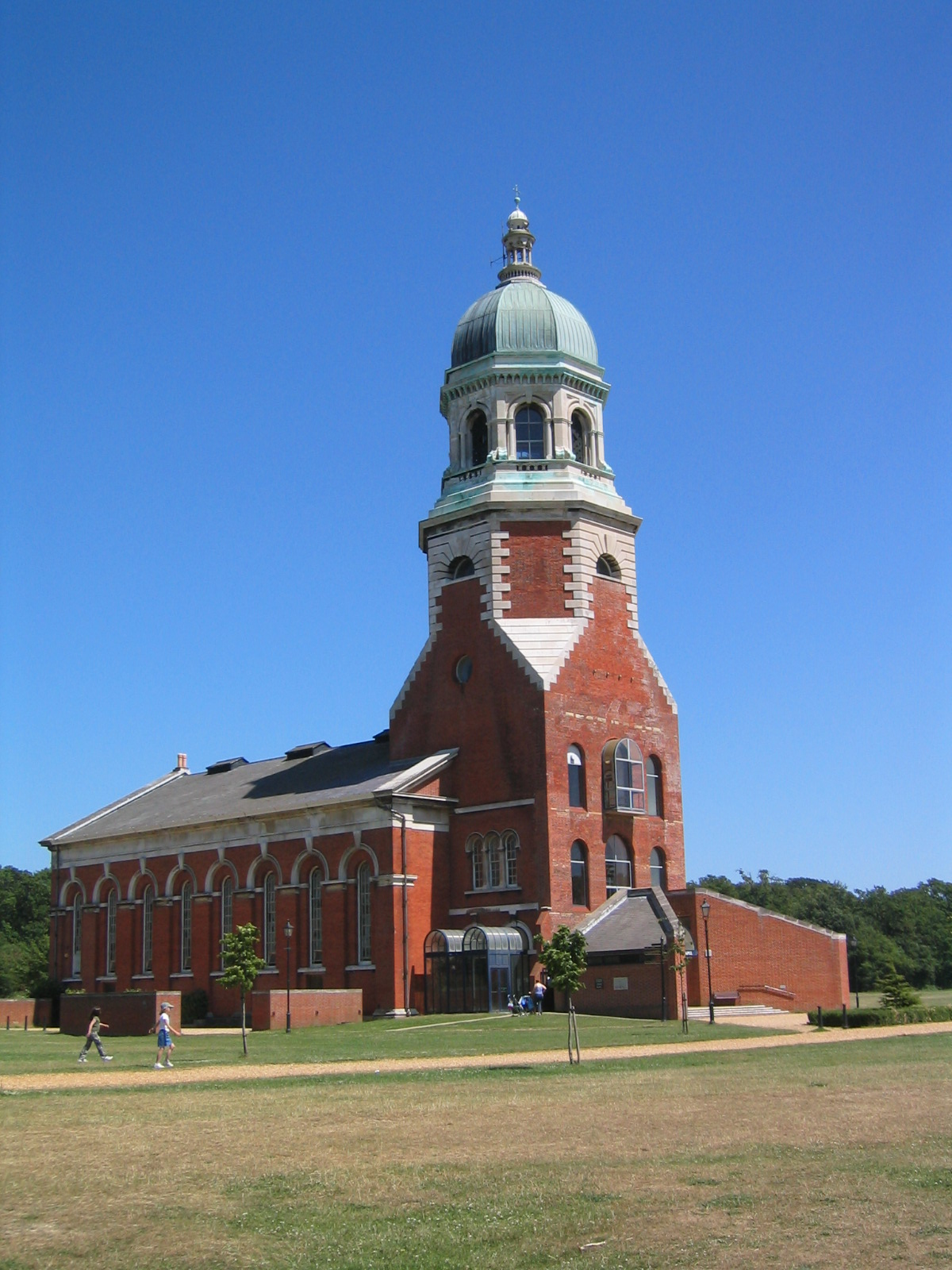
Netley Hospital chapel in the Royal Victoria Country Park

The Royal Victoria Country Park is a country park in Netley, Hampshire, England, by the shores of Southampton Water. It comprises 200 acres (81 ha) of mature woodland and grassy parkland, as well as a small shingle beach. It was created in 1970 by Hampshire County Council, after the Royal Victoria Military Hospital that had previously occupied the site, was demolished.

All that remains of the hospital is the chapel, which acts as a heritage centre providing history of the hospital. It also has a 150-foot (46 m) viewing tower, providing views over the park, and across Southampton Water to Hythe, and on a clear day, as far as Southampton itself.

The site also has a park office and tearooms. The building housing this was built using 100 different timbers from around the UK and British Empire. It was originally built in 1940 by the YMCA for entertainment, recreation and relaxation for staff and patients at the hospital.

== History ==
In 1958, the vast majority of the hospital closed to patients.

In 1966, the last part of the hospital was demolished, with the chapel being the only remnant of the former hospital. The foundation stone, laid by Queen Victoria was lifted in a special ceremony.

In 1978, the psychiatric hospital finally closed, with it bringing to an end hospital services on the site.

In 1979, the Hampshire County Council bought the site and it was opened as a country park in 1980.

In 2002, the park became grade II listed.

In January 2014 it was announced that a Heritage Lottery Fund grant of £102,000 would be used for restoring the chapel and revealing more detail of the former hospital.

== Royal Victoria Railway ==
The Royal Victoria Railway runs for around 1 mile (1.6 km) through Royal Victoria Country Park in Netley, Hampshire, England, with views of Southampton Water. It is run entirely by volunteers. The line is built to the popular gauge of 10 1/4 in (260 mm) and runs every weekend throughout the year and all school holidays.

== Netley Military Cemetery ==
The Netley Military Cemetery to the rear of the hospital site, primarily for patients of the former hospital, is accessible to the public. Among those buried here are 636 Commonwealth service personnel who died in the First World War and 35 in the Second World War whose graves are maintained and registered by the Commonwealth War Graves Commission, who also care for the war graves of 69 Germans and 12 Belgians from the First and of one Polish soldier from the Second war.

== Hamble Rail Trail ==
The park is the start and end point for the Hamble Rail Trail, a path that follows the Netley Hospital Branch Line out of the hospital, and then along a former BP oil tanker rail line. Once at the end, it follows the Solent Way back to the country park. The path in total is 4.5 miles (7.2 kilometres), with it having steel markers along the route.

The oil tanker line was constructed during the First World War to transport aircraft from Manchester to Hamble-le-Rice. A siding was built as part of the railway to serve the flying boat factory in Hamble. The line was not actually used during the war as hostilities ceased before it could be utilised; it was, however, purchased for the storage and transportation of oil to the BP oil terminal in Hamble. BP maintain the option of reopening the line, but it has not been used since 1986 when it transported crude oil from Wytch Farm in Dorset, a route which has since been replaced by a 56-mile-long (90 km) pipeline.
