= Southampton–Fareham line =

Railway line in Hampshire, England

The Southampton–Fareham line is a railway line in England, along the south coast of Hampshire. As a through line it came late in British Railway history, traversing unpromising coastal terrain. The first part from Portswood, near Southampton, to Netley was opened in 1866, prompted by the establishment of the Royal Victoria Hospital at Netley, which had been established for the care of wounded soldiers.

The second stage was the continuation from Netley to Fareham, forming a though route, in 1889. Fareham was already connected with Portsmouth, so by this means, a through route from Southampton to Portsmouth was created.

In 1990 the line was electrified, and the passenger train service pattern was changed, with many more trains taking advantage of the Farlington Junction to Cosham chord, to run direct from Havant to Fareham avoiding Portsmouth. The line continues on that basis at the present time.

== History ==
=== Previous railways ===
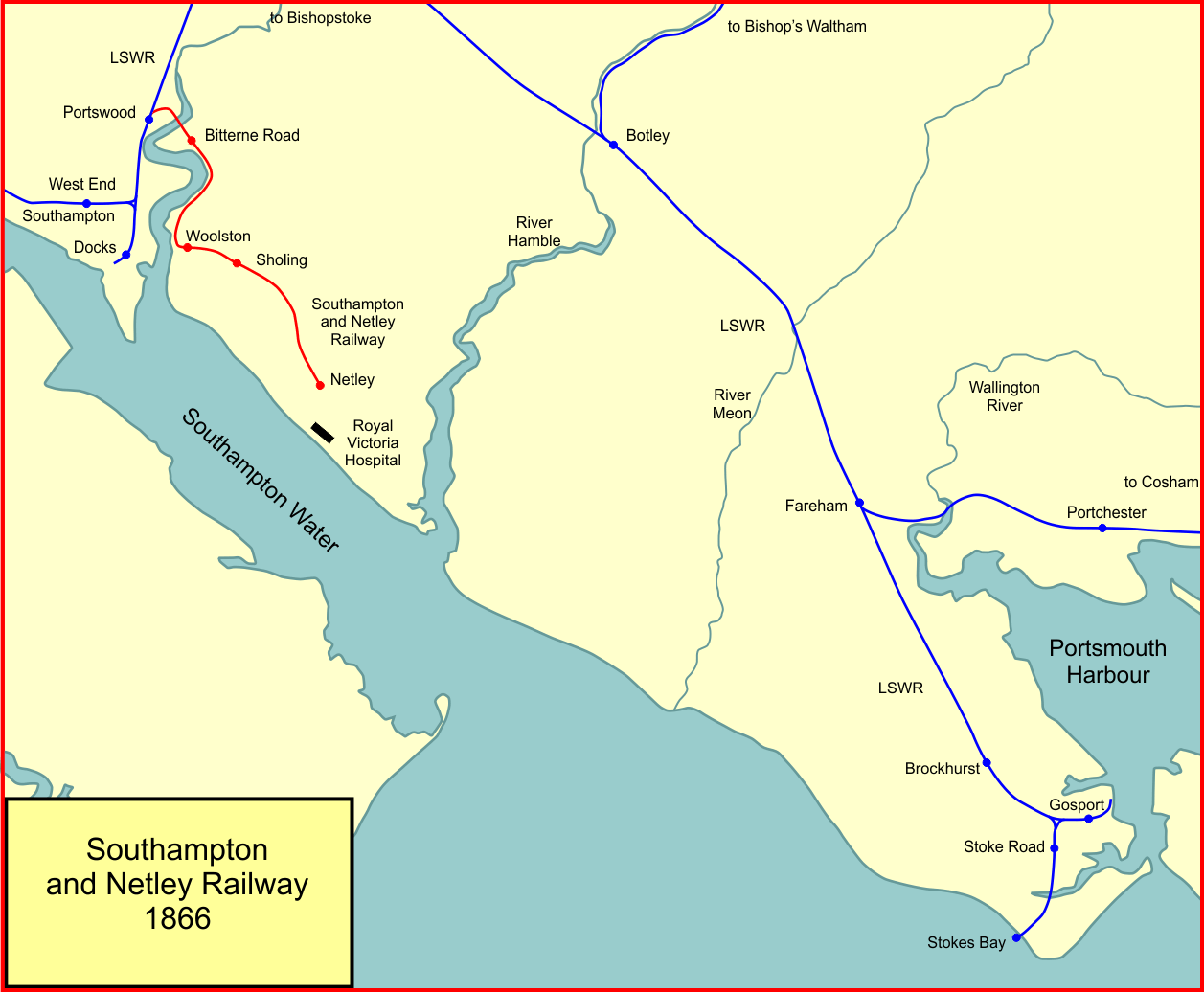
System map of the Southampton and Netley Railway in 1866

The London and Southampton Railway had opened its line in 1840 and then in 1841 gave Portsmouth a half-hearted railway connection at Gosport, requiring a ferry crossing and a roundabout route to get to London. Changing the company name to London and South Western Railway (LSWR) did not completely erase the tension between the citizens of Portsmouth and Southampton.

The Gosport branch was from a junction on the main line at Bishopstoke, later renamed Eastleigh. The LSWR next built a railway to reach Portsmouth more directly, but curving round the head of Portsmouth Harbour. Fierce competition with the London, Brighton and South Coast Railway (LBSCR) (Note: At first the local railway was the Brighton and Chichester Railway, which had an authorised extension to Portsmouth; it was an affiliate of the LBSCR.) made collaboration difficult for a time, but it was agreed to build a joint railway on Portsea Island. The LSWR built a branch from Fareham, on the Gosport line, to Cosham, and the LBSCR built from there to Portsmouth and made that section joint. These lines, connecting Fareham and Portsmouth, and Fareham and Havant, opened in 1848.

There was a great deal of territory on the coast between Fareham and Southampton, but it seemed to be of limited commercial value, and for some years ideas of a railway through it were discouraging. Passenger and goods transport between Southampton and Portsmouth was swifter and more convenient by coastal shipping.

=== Netley Hospital established ===
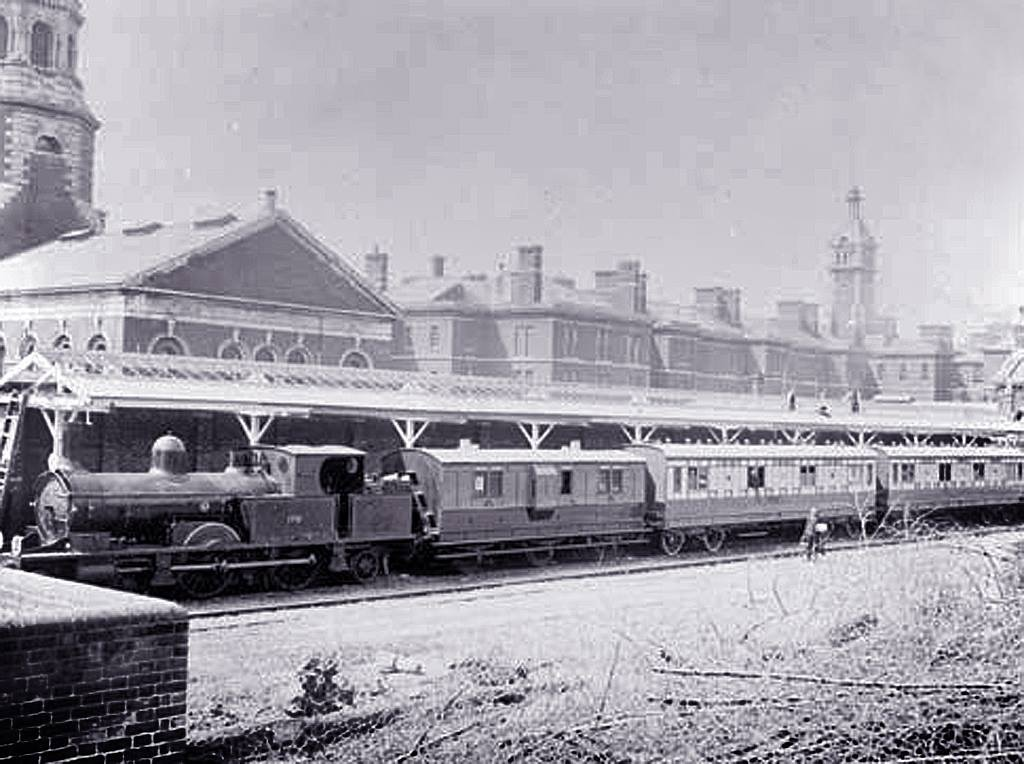
Train at Netley Hospital

In 1863 the Victoria Military Hospital was constructed at Netley; it was built for the treatment and recuperation of maimed soldiers. The patients often arrived in considerable numbers in special hospital trains, and many of them were not ambulatory. Moreover, in those days large hospitals needed some reliable transport connection to bring in consumables – foodstuffs and coal, and personnel. A small village grew in the area, housing staff and their families. In September 1859 a proposal to connect the hospital with Bishopstoke was turned down by the LSWR. An independent parliamentary bill the following year proposed a Southampton and Fareham line, but it depended on the co-operation of the LSWR at both ends, and when this was withheld, the proposal collapsed. It was suspected by the LSWR board that the London, Brighton and South Coast Railway were supporting the scheme, intending to get access for themselves to Southampton.

Southampton and Netley Railway Act 1861
- Act of Parliament
- Parliament of the United Kingdom
- Long title: An Act for making a Railway between the London and South-western Railway at or near to that Railway at Saint Denis near Southampton, and the Military Hospital at Netley, and for other Purposes.
- Citation: 24 & 25 Vict. c. ccxx
- Territorial extent: United Kingdom

Dates
- Royal assent: 1 August 1861
- Commencement: 1 August 1861 (Note: The Acts of Parliament (Commencement) Act 1793.)

Status: Current legislation

Nevertheless, the idea did not go away, and in 1861 the Southampton and Netley Railway obtained an authorising act of Parliament, the Southampton and Netley Railway Act 1861 (24 & 25 Vict. c. ccxx) on 1 August 1861; authorised share capital was £48,000. As it did not form a through route, the sensitivity regarding the LBSCR was not an issue. The route was constrained by the need to cross the River Itchen from the Southampton area; a convenient place was found north of Northam Bridge. The line was to run from a junction at Portswood, a few miles north of Southampton (Docks) station on the London main line. A new Portswood station was built at the junction; its name was later changed to St Denys.

=== Authorisation of the Southampton and Netley line ===
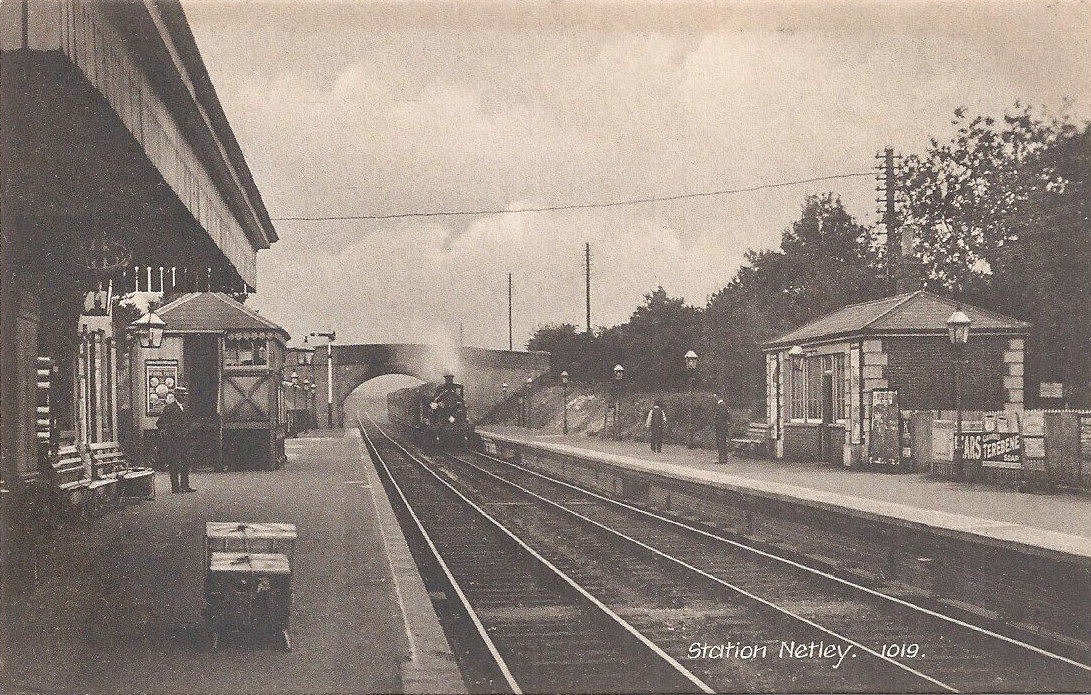
Netley railway station

The Southampton and Netley Railway Company was independent, but the authorising act permitted the LSWR to subscribe up to £5,000 and make working arrangements. Although it was prepared to do so, the LSWR still suspected bad faith, believing that the line was a speculative scheme intended to extort money from them, rather than a genuine attempt to construct a railway. Notwithstanding this suspicion, the LSWR later decided to acquire the company, as the alternative was that it might fall into the hands of a competitor, probably the LBSCR. At this stage the S&NR had not built any railway.

Southampton and Netley Railway Act 1864 (Note: Section 1.)
- Act of Parliament
- Parliament of the United Kingdom
- Long title: An Act for authorizing an Alteration of the Southampton and Netley Railway, and the Amalgamation of the Southampton and Netley Railway with the London and South-western Railway; and for other Purposes.
- Citation: 27 & 28 Vict. c. clxxiii
- Territorial extent: United Kingdom

Dates
- Royal assent: 14 July 1864
- Commencement: 14 July 1864

Status: Current legislation

Text of statute as originally enacted

Having purchased the company, the LSWR naturally installed its own nominees as directors; this was done in 1863; a new Southampton and Netley Railway Act 1864 (27 & 28 Vict. c. clxxiii) of 14 July 1864 and the South-western Railway (Various Powers) Act 1864 (27 & 28 Vict. c. ccxxvii) of 25 July 1864 made 1 January 1864 the amalgamation date: the LSWR took on liability for S&NR loans and other liabilities at that time. (Note: The amalgamation date was half a year before the authorisations. Retrospective authorisation was not uncommon, but Carter has 1865 on page 321, and 1864 on page 367.)

The line was not extensive at five miles in length, and work proceeded swiftly; the biggest construction by far was a three-span viaduct over the River Itchen, 115 yards long. Caissons had been sunk to prodigious depths to find firm ground. The viaduct cost about £14,500.

Captain Tyler of the Board of Trade carried out an inspection of the completed works on 22 February 1866; the line passed the inspection and it opened on 5 March 1866 without ceremony. It was worked by train staff and ticket, with eight weekday trains daily each way, three on Sundays. The journey time from Southampton Docks station was 23 minutes; intermediate stops were Portswood (renamed St Denys from 1876) on the main line, then at Bitterne Road (renamed Bitterne in 1896), Woolston and Netley on the new line. It was not until 1883 that a direct siding connection was made from Netley station to the hospital; the War Office was charged interest on the capital outlay of the extension.

=== Continuation to Fareham ===
Fareham and Netley Railway Act 1865
- Act of Parliament
- Parliament of the United Kingdom
- Long title: An Act to incorporate a Company for making "The Fareham and Netley Railway;" and for other Purposes.
- Citation: 28 & 29 Vict. c. cliii
- Territorial extent: United Kingdom

Dates
- Royal assent: 29 June 1865
- Commencement: 29 June 1865
- Repealed: 31 January 2013

Other legislation
- Repealed by: Statute Law (Repeals) Act 2013

Status: Repealed

Text of statute as originally enacted

Fareham and Netley Railway Act 1868
- Act of Parliament
- Parliament of the United Kingdom
- Long title: An Act for the Extension of Time and Revival of Powers for the compulsory Purchase of Lands and Completion of Works authorized by The Fareham and Netley Railway Act, 1865;[z] and for other Purposes.
- Citation: 31 & 32 Vict. c. clix
- Territorial extent: United Kingdom

Dates
- Royal assent: 31 July 1868
- Commencement: 31 July 1868
- Repealed: 31 January 2013

Other legislation
- Repealed by: Statute Law (Repeals) Act 2013

Status: Repealed

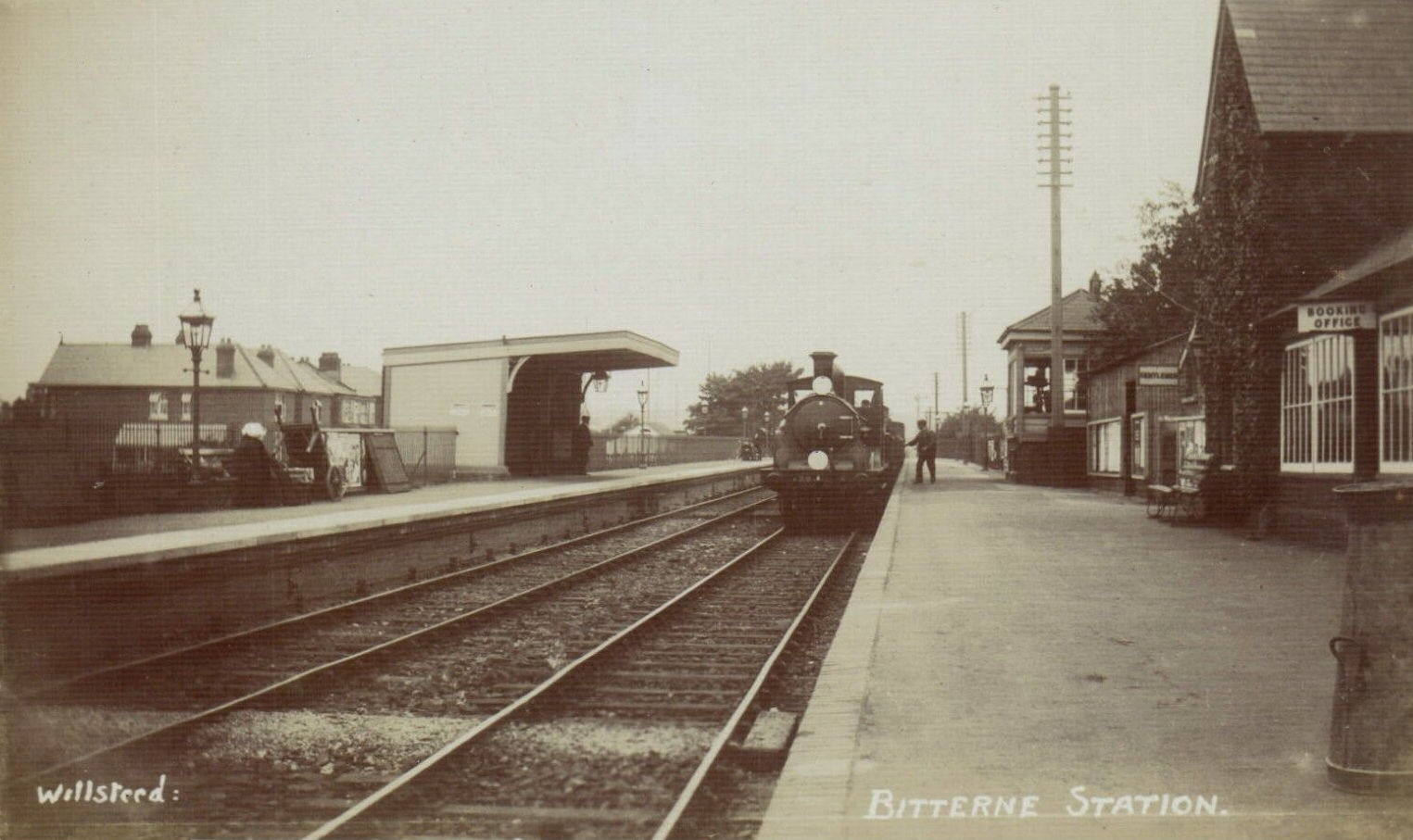
Bitterne railway station

There was now an obvious gap between Netley and Fareham, and a company was promoted to close it: the Fareham and Netley Railway Company got powers in the Fareham and Netley Railway Act 1865 (28 & 29 Vict. c. cliii) on 29 June 1865, share capital £105,000, to extend from the S&NR line across the River Hamble by a swing bridge, to join the LSWR from the south at Fareham station. (Note: Carter has the capital as £140,000. Parliament almost always authorised debenture loans of 25% of share capital; and Carter frequently confuses them. £105,000 share capital plus 25% makes £140,000.) Spur connections would be provided at Fareham to connect directly to the LSWR Cosham line and the Gosport branch. However the project made no progress, and on 19 March 1878 the Board of Trade authorised abandonment.

In October 1882 the LSWR was approached on behalf of the Duke of Cambridge, as Commander-in-Chief of the Forces requesting it to extend the Netley line to Fareham; there was thought to be military advantage in such a connection. Accordingly, the LSWR promoted a line from Netley to Fareham taking a more northerly route than the earlier scheme and entering Fareham station from the north. The line was to be a little under 8 miles in length. The line was authorised by the South Western Railway (Various Powers) Act 1883 (46 & 47 Vict. c. clxxxix) obtained on 20 August 1883. As with the line from Portswood, this section of line was constrained by a river crossing, in this case of the River Hamble.

A Railway (the Netley and Fareham Railway) 7 miles 6 furlongs and 2.55 chains or thereabouts in length commencing in the parish of Hound in the county of Southampton by a junction with the Company's Netley branch Railway and terminating in the parish of Fareham in the same county by a junction with the Company's Bishopstoke Fareham and Gosport Railway. — Section 6, South Western Railway (Various Powers) Act 1883 (46 & 47 Vict. c. clxxxix)

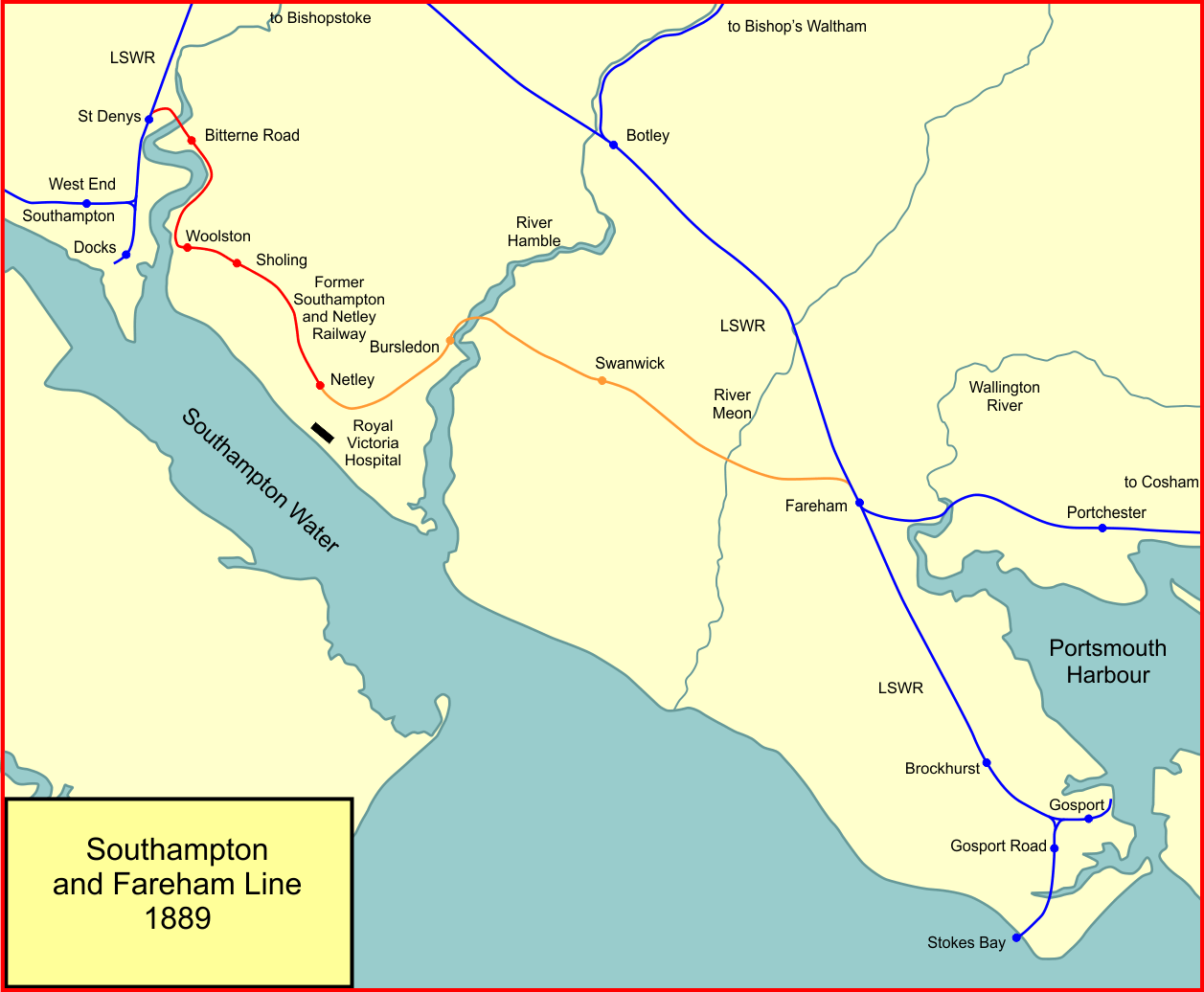
System map of the Southampton to Fareham railway line in 1889

A contract was let to Henry Lovatt for £78,674; the first sod was cut early in April 1886, and work proceeded rapidly. The Hamble viaduct was 190 yards in length on a 30 chain curve, with six 95 foot spans. Fareham station was enlarged. The line opened to the public on 2 September 1889 without ceremony. At first, seven passenger and one goods train ran daily each way.

The line was single track, with crossing stations at Bitterne Road, Netley (on the earlier line) and Swanwick; and there were also stations at Woolston, Sholing and Bursledon. The line between St Denys and Netley cost over £164,000, and the Fareham extension more than £231,000. The hoped-for residential development did not come in the nineteenth century.

== Netley Hospital branch line ==
The Royal Victoria Hospital at Netley was opened on 11 March 1863 to accommodate military patients returning from overseas service. A landing stage made access from the water easy, but by land the hospital was about three-quarters of a mile from Netley station, which opened on 5 March 1866. A special hospital platform was provided on a siding by Hound Road at the eastern end of the goods yard, but was far from satisfactory as it was unroofed until 1898 and without a waiting room until 1899.

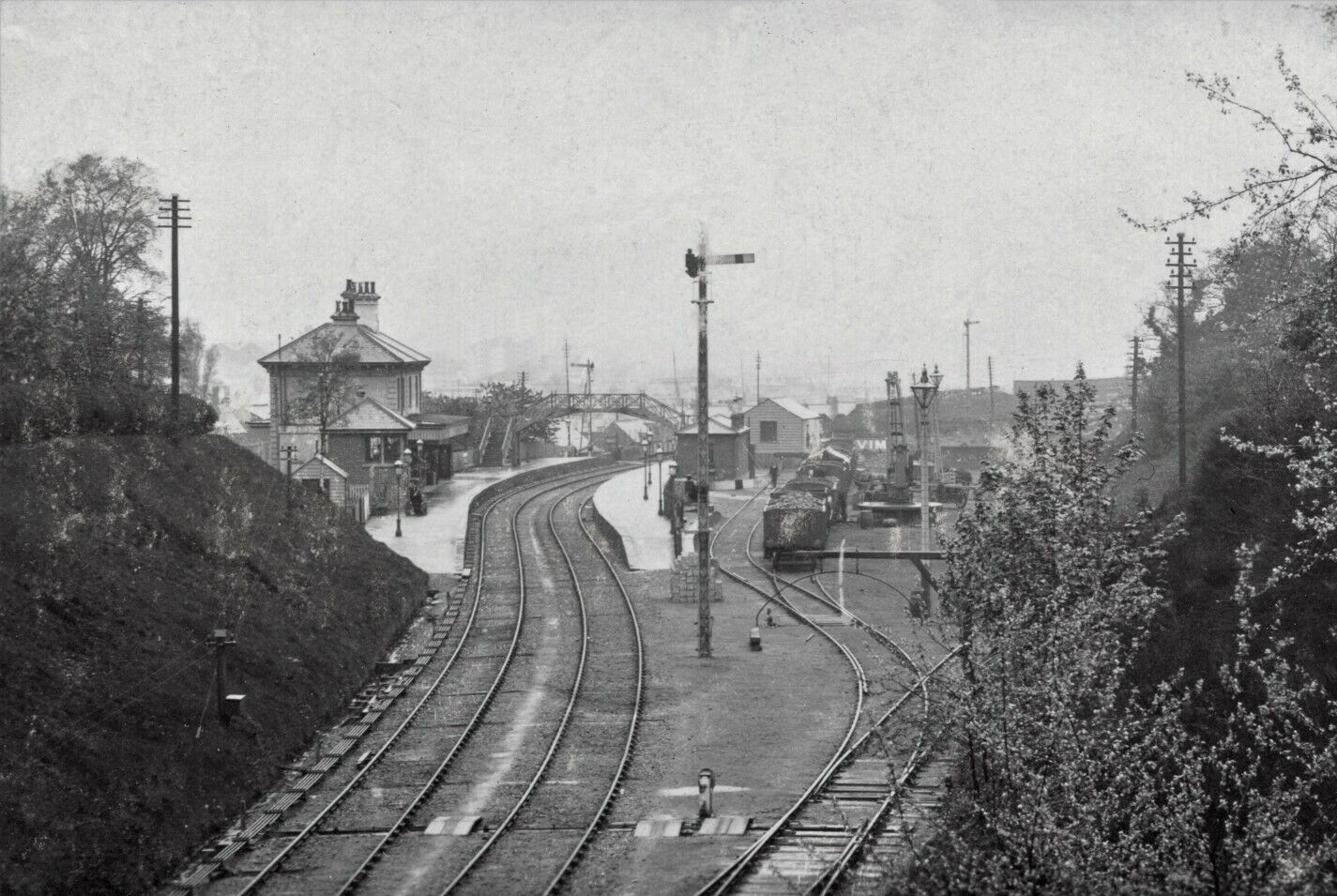
Woolston railway station

That year the War Department asked the LSWR to lay a branch line to the hospital, of just over half a mile in length. It had steep gradients rising at 1 in 70 (1.43%) towards the main line, and it proved difficult to work, especially in autumn when the rails were damp and covered with fallen leaves from overhanging trees. The line opened on 18 April 1900 and the first two trains arrived on 23 April with casualties from the Battle of Ladysmith. The flat-bottomed rails were spiked directly to the sleepers. A 196-foot-long covered platform was connected to the hospital by a covered way. A small ticket office was staffed, when required, by Netley station personnel. Later in 1900 a siding was laid at the hospital to stable five ambulance coaches in a corrugated iron shed. The hospital's steam supply was used to pre-heat them before use.

Between 24 August 1914 and 31 December 1918 approximately 1,200 hospital trains arrived at Netley. Each Tuesday and Friday a train left with discharged patients. Immediately prior to the Second World War rail movements on the hospital line averaged about five a year. During the war, very few hospital trains arrived at Netley until 1944, by which time it had been taken over by the American authorities. In order to use heavier locomotives, the track was relaid with good second-hand bullhead rails on fresh ballast. Following D-Day, casualties were brought by road but, when treated and fit to travel, were moved by ambulance trains to other hospitals for further treatment and convalescence. In June and July 1944, up to five fourteen-to-sixteen-coach trains left Netley Hospital daily with an engine at each end. Wet rails, combined with the steep gradient, could cause the trip up to the main line to take as long as forty-five minutes on occasions. The last train over the line was on 30 August 1955, when 700 class 0-6-0 No 30350 hauled out the remaining ward cars.

=== Double track ===
Double track was provided on the entire main line from St Denys to Fareham in 1910.

=== Hamble Airfields ===
In 1913 the Admiralty established an airfield at Hamble Point; there seem to have been more than one airfield concentrating on assembling seaplanes, and in 1917 the Admiralty established an acceptance depot. This was a depot for the delivery and reception into service of Royal Naval Air Service aircraft, but it was not brought into use before the end of World War One.

A branch line to it was built; it was subsequently used by the BP company, but has been disused since 1986. It is now the Hamble Rail Trail.

=== Traffic since 1945 ===
In 1957 diesel-electric multiple units took over the local passenger operation, and an intensive service was started.

Writing in 1961, White noted that "Local passenger traffic is heavy and the train service correspondingly frequent. An even more intensive service operated by diesel-electric trains was started in 1957. Swanwick is the centre of a market gardening area which specializes in strawberries and other soft fruits. In one week of 1931 one and a quarter million baskets were forwarded. Passenger-rated fruit traffic, mainly for the Midlands, is still heavy." However, by 1965 the strawberry traffic had transferred to road.

=== Electrification ===
The Portsmouth lines from London had been electrified in 1937 and 1938 as part of the Portsmouth Line No.1 Scheme and the Portsmouth Line No. 2 Scheme. This was followed in July 1967 by the electrification of the London to Bournemouth main line.

This left the Fareham routes unelectrified, and in the 1980s it was decided to authorise infilling of these lines, a £22 million scheme. The group of routes included St Denys to Portcreek Junction and Farlington Junction, as well as Eastleigh to Fareham. A new passenger timetable with electric traction was introduced on 14 May 1990. An official opening had taken place on 9 May when Cecil Parkinson the Secretary of State for Transport visited Hedge End, using an electric train. Actual commissioning had taken place some time previously; there was a Gala Day at Eastleigh on 6 May and an electric train was photographed at Fareham.

Before the electrification, relatively few passenger services worked across the Farlington to Cosham chord, but now the majority did so, giving new frequent connectional opportunities avoiding a detour into Portsmouth.

== Present day services ==
As of 2022 the line is operated as part of the West Coastway line passenger services. South Western Railway, Southern and Great Western Railway operate passenger trains on the route. The typical service off peak is an hourly all-stations train Portsmouth to Southampton, an hourly Great Western train running fast Fareham to Southampton typically on a Brighton to Cardiff journey, and a Victoria to Southampton service. Locations

- Portswood; opened 5 March 1866, about a quarter mile south of earlier Portswood, which it replaced; renamed St Denys 1 January 1876; still open;
- Bitterne Road; opened 5 March 1866; renamed Bitterne 20 September 1896; still open;
- Woolston; opened 5 March 1866; still open;
- Sholing; opened 1 August 1866; still open;
- Netley; opened 5 March 1866; still open;
- Netley Hospital; on branch from Netley, opened 18 April 1900; regular use ceased 1920s; heavily used in WW2 after D-Day as US Army hospital; only occasional use after 1945;
- Hamble; opened 18 January 1942; still open;
- Crow Park Halt; workmen; opened about July 1918; closed by July 1920; location opposite Bursledon Brickworks; the road crossing the railway at this point is known as Coal Park Lane;
- Bursledon; opened 2 September 1889; still open;
- Swanwick; opened 2 September 1889; still open.
- Fareham; opened 29 November 1841; still open.
