= Netley =

Village and parish in Hampshire, England

Coordinates: 50.87421°N 1.35328°W

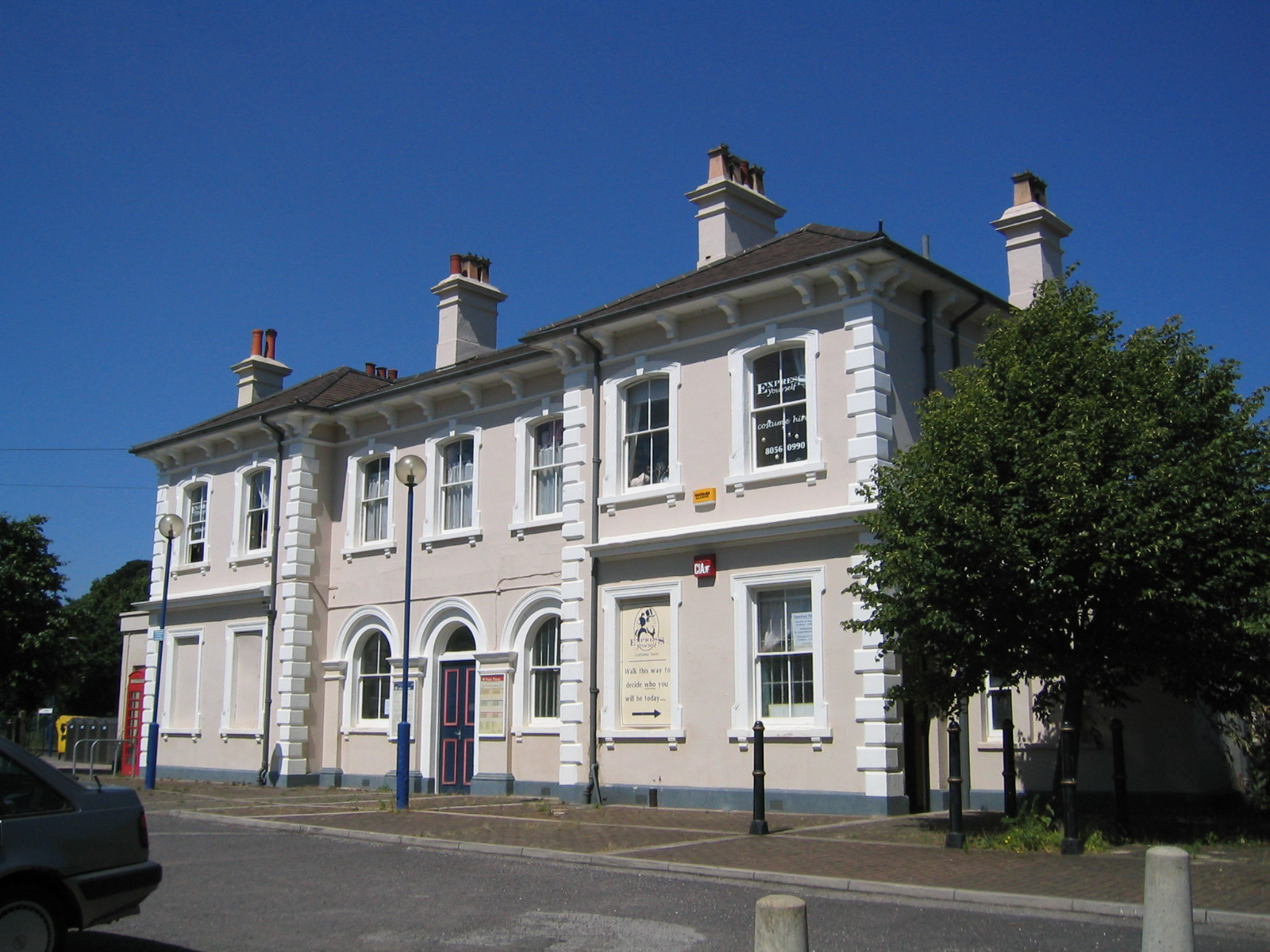
- Netley railway station

- Location within Hampshire
- OS grid reference: SU454085
- District: Eastleigh
- Shire county: Hampshire
- Region: South East
- Country: England
- Sovereign state: United Kingdom
- Post town: Southampton
- Postcode district: SO31
- Dialling code: 023
- Police: Hampshire and Isle of Wight
- Fire: Hampshire and Isle of Wight
- Ambulance: South Central
- UK Parliament: Hamble Valley

Netley, officially Netley Abbey, is a village on the south coast of Hampshire, England. It is situated to the south-east of the city of Southampton, and flanked on one side by the ruins of Netley Abbey and on the other by the Royal Victoria Country Park.

== Historical development ==
In 1237, Netley Abbey, after which the village gained its name, was built. The site was picked specifically as it met the requirements of the Cistercians that would run it. This was specifically that the abbey would be built 'remote from towns', indicating there was little settlement here.

In 1536, Netley Abbey was dissolved as part of the Dissolution of the monasteries, with the buildings being converted into a Tudor mansion. This was given to Sir William Paulet. In 1542 or 1544, Netley Castle was constructed as part of the Device Programme to defend The Solent from French invasions. This utilised abandoned parts of the former Abbey, like its water supply and building materials.

By the start of the 19th century, the castle and Abbey laid in ruins. The area also had two villas known as Netley Castle and Netley Lodge. The area which now forms all of Netley, as well as Weston, was inherited by William Chamberlayne, MP for Southampton. With his passing in 1829, his nephew Thomas Chamberlayne inherited the estate. Throughout this period, negotiations surrounding leases of the land for development were undertaken, which allowed the village of Netley to finally take shape, with the population being 827 in 1852. This growth was exacerbated in 1856, when HM Government bought a large part of this estate, to construct a new military hospital. This would become the Royal Victoria Military Hospital, which is now Royal Victoria Country Park. In 1861, the village was first listed as 'Netley Abbey', with its population being recorded as 2039. In 1863, the High street, named 'Victoria Road', was opened, with it having shops and a post office. In March 1866, Netley railway station was opened, with it linking the village to Southampton. In 1900 a branch was added to take the line right into the heart of the Royal Victoria Hospital, allowing injured troops to disembark at Southampton Docks and get a direct train to the hospital - the pier at the hospital could not accommodate large ships. This line was used extensively in the Boer war and both World Wars but was lifted around 1967 when the Hospital was demolished. Its route now forms a small part of the Hamble Rail Trail. The line was extended from Netley station to Fareham in 1889. In 1884, the foundation stone of Netley Infants school was laid. The school was closed in the 1970s and is now a library. Previously, the village students had to travel to Butlocks Heath, the neighbouring village, for schooling. Two years later in 1886, the village gained a new church, named after St Edward the Confessor. As part of Queen Victoria's Diamond Jubilee in 1897, the village was gifted a new Recreation Ground, by Tankerville Chamberlayne, then owner of the Chamberlayne estate. The local parish council was allowed to pick the location, with them picking a site just off station road, due to its centrality in the parish. The green gates which still remain on the site were also gifted by Tankerville. In 1901, the population hit 4548.

== Present-day ==
The oldest part of Netley retains the feel of a somewhat old-fashioned and quaint village, with some traditional small shops, a post office, a library and rows of colourful terraced cottages. It is located along the eastern shore of Southampton Water; the shingle beach looks across to Hythe and Fawley, although the vista is somewhat dominated by Fawley Oil Refinery.

Away from the shore, larger estates of houses have developed over the years which have greatly increased Netley's population and blurred the boundary between Netley Abbey and Butlocks Heath.

There is a pub 'The Prince Consort' in a Victorian building that was previously a hotel.

== Amenities ==
=== Churches ===
- St Edward the Confessor Church. It was completed 1886 and contains a partial effigy of a knight taken from Netley Abbey. The church was originally designed by J. D. Sedding.
- Annunciation Catholic Church

=== Schools ===
Netley Abbey Infant School and Netley Abbey Junior School are on the same site. They saw significant development in the late 1980's.

=== Village Halls ===
- Abbey Hall, on the Cricket field
- St Edwards Church Hall

=== Library ===
There is one library in Netley, which is run by Hampshire County Council. It is based in the old Infant School.

=== Weston Sailing Club ===
Weston Sailing Club is in Netley, at Abbey Hill on Weston Shore. The club was founded in 1952 but originally located in Weston. In 1968 the club was granted land at Abbey Hill, and built a clubhouse there.

== Parks and Green Space ==
=== Royal Victoria Country Park ===
Since the closure of the Netley Military Hospital in 1979, the village has been flanked to the east by Royal Victoria Country Park. This attract visitors from Netley and the wider area.

=== Westwoods Nature Reserve ===
To the west, Netley is flanked by Westwoods, which was previously farmland for the Netley Abbey.

=== Netley Recreation Ground ===
Opened in 1897 as part of the Queen Victoria's Diamond Jubilee, it was gifted to the parish council by Tankerville Chamberlayne. It was first used as a cricket field, with many trees being planted for its opening. Green gates were also gifted, which remain in place today. Today, the 'rec' has a football field, a playground, basketball court and an outdoor gym.

=== The Cricket Field ===
This was bought by the Parish council in 1937 for £1000, with them gaining a significant discount. Today, the site is frequently used as a football pitch, with it also having a playground and a replica Beacon. The site now has a community hall too.

== Transport ==
=== Road ===
Netley has four main roads in and out of it. It is a short distance from the M27 motorway.

=== Rail ===
Netley Railway Station has hourly services to Southampton Central and Portsmouth Harbour via the train company South Western Railway, providing links for commuters both in and out of the village.

=== Bus ===
Bluestar operate a half-hourly bus service to Southampton via Woolston and Hamble via Butlocks Heath, numbered '15'. Netley is also linked to Hedge End by Stagecoach South's '49h'. Netley also has multiple school and college bus routes.

=== Cycling ===
National Cycle Network route 2 passes through Netley, on its way from Dover to St Austell.

== See also ==
- List of places of worship in the Borough of Eastleigh
- Northam
- River Itchen
