= History of Southampton =

Southampton is a city in Hampshire, England. The area has been settled since the Stone Age. Its history has been affected by its geographical location, on a major estuary on the English Channel coast with an unusual double high tide, and by its proximity to Winchester and London; the ancient and modern capitals of England. Having been an important regional centre for centuries, Southampton was awarded city status by Queen Elizabeth II in 1964.

Southampton became an important port in medieval times, experiencing several hundred years of fluctuating fortunes until it was expanded by the Victorians.

As a centre of commerce, an industrial town and an important military embarkation point, Southampton was a strategic target for the Luftwaffe and was severely damaged in World War II.

Post-war redevelopment and the need to accommodate 20th-century innovations such as the motor car have significantly altered the character of Southampton.

== Prehistoric times ==
Numerous gravel pits have been dug in the Southampton area, many of which have yielded Stone Age tools. Evidence of a Stone Age settlement has been found at Priory Avenue, St Denys.

Bronze Age objects have been found on Southampton Common, particularly by grave-diggers working in the cemetery and during the construction of the reservoir. Further Bronze Age finds have been made near Cobden Bridge.

Iron Age earthworks have been found at Lordswood and Aldermoor and evidence of Iron Age buildings has been found in the City Centre.

== Roman occupation (AD 43–410) ==
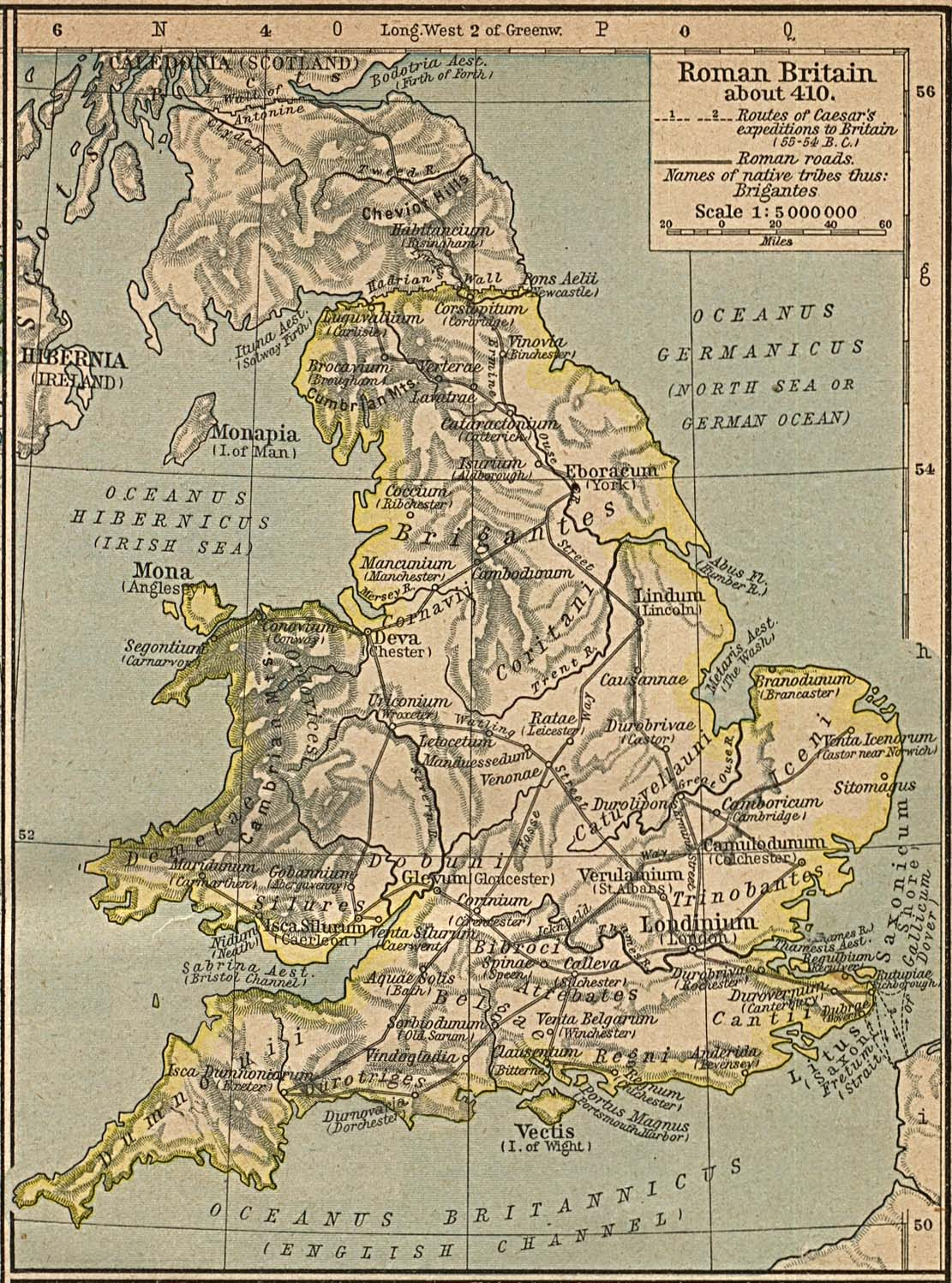
Road map of Roman Britain

Antonine Itinerary VII documents the Roman settlement of Clausentum in Roman Britain as being 20 miles (32 km) west of Noviomagus Reginorum (Chichester) and 10 miles (16 km) from Venta Belgarum (Winchester).

In about 1770 John Speed claimed that Clausentum was in the area that is now known as Bitterne Manor. In 1792 the Rev. Richard Warner investigated those claims and found a ditch, a bank and some Roman coins. Since then this site has been investigated further and is generally accepted as the site of Clausentum, but there is no universal agreement. Reference to modern maps show Bitterne Manor to be 25 miles (40 km) from Chichester. Wickham is at the junction of two Roman Roads and is a better fit to the distances documented in Antonine Itinerary VII. The case for Clausentum being situated at Bitterne Manor is based on archaeological evidence and the geography of the site (inside a sharp bend in the River Itchen), which clearly allowed it to be turned into a good defensive position.

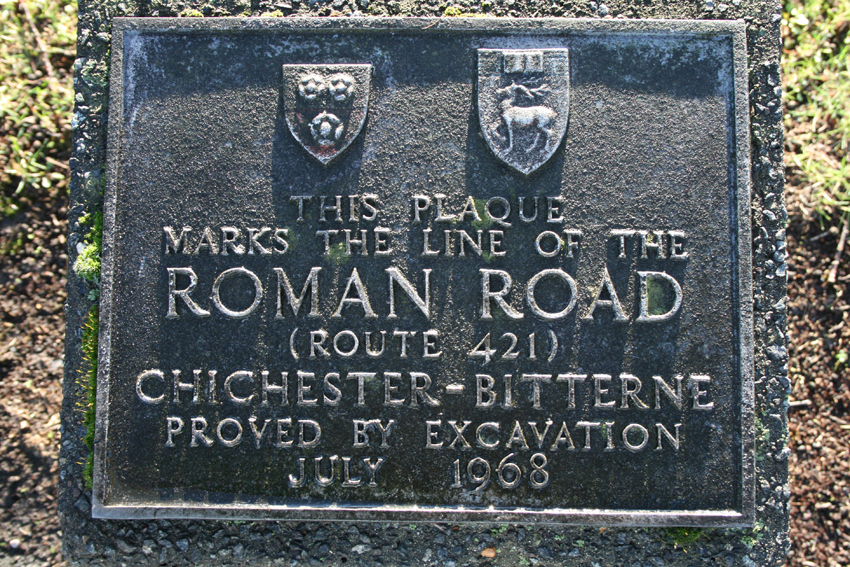
Plaque marking the site of the Roman road on Freemantle Common

But the fact that there was a Roman settlement at what is now Bitterne Manor is not disputed. Archaeological finds at what is believed to be Clausentum show the site to have been an important trading port with some significant buildings. Traces of a Roman Road on a line running from Bitterne Manor to Wickham have also been found. Elsewhere possible evidence of Roman-era farming was found on the site of what is now St Mary's Stadium.

The Romans abandoned the settlement circa 410 when the Roman occupation of Britain ended.

== Anglo Saxon period (400–1066) ==
The Anglo-Saxons moved the centre of the town across the River Itchen to what is now the St Mary's area. The settlement was known as Hamwic and/or Hamtun: the two names coexisted and described the same area but were used in different contexts. By the middle of the 11th century, the area is described as South Hamtun by Anglo-Saxon chroniclers. References to St Mary's Church also appear in 11th-century documents. Hamwic is referred to as a market in the account of the life of St Willibald, written by an Anglo-Saxon nun named Hygeburg in the late 8th century. The town developed under royal patronage where traders could be protected and taxed.

Excavations have revealed a section of the street plan of Hamwic and uncovered one of the best collections of Saxon artefacts in Europe. These collectively show that Hamwic was a planned town, that it became an important port and traded with the continent and was a royal administrative centre. The 110-acre site possibly sheltered a population of 2,000 or 3,000 people during c. AD 700–850. The excavations also found 68 houses and workshops, 21 wells and 500 pits. Hamwic was the site of a mint for several Anglo-Saxon Kings (AD 786–858) until it was moved to Winchester later in the 9th century. Series H silver pennies were issued in Hamwic in the 8th century AD. They have mostly been found within or close to Hamwic.

Hamwic is also believed to have been a point of departure for slaves (being sent to the market at Rouen) and pilgrims such as Willibald to important European cities such as Rome.

== Vikings (700–1066) ==
Viking raids on Southampton disrupted trade with the continent and contributed to the reorganisation of Wessex. Important industries that were previously well-established in Hamwic were withdrawn further inland to the new fortifications at Winchester, contributing to the decline of Hamwic.

Archaeological excavations show evidence of 10th-century settlements and a defended enclosure in what was later to become the Medieval walled town.

The Viking King Canute the Great defeated the Anglo-Saxon King Ethelred the Unready in 1014 and was crowned in Southampton. His demonstration that he could not stop the tide is sometimes said to have taken place in Southampton, but is likely to have been apocryphal.

== Normans (1066–1154) ==
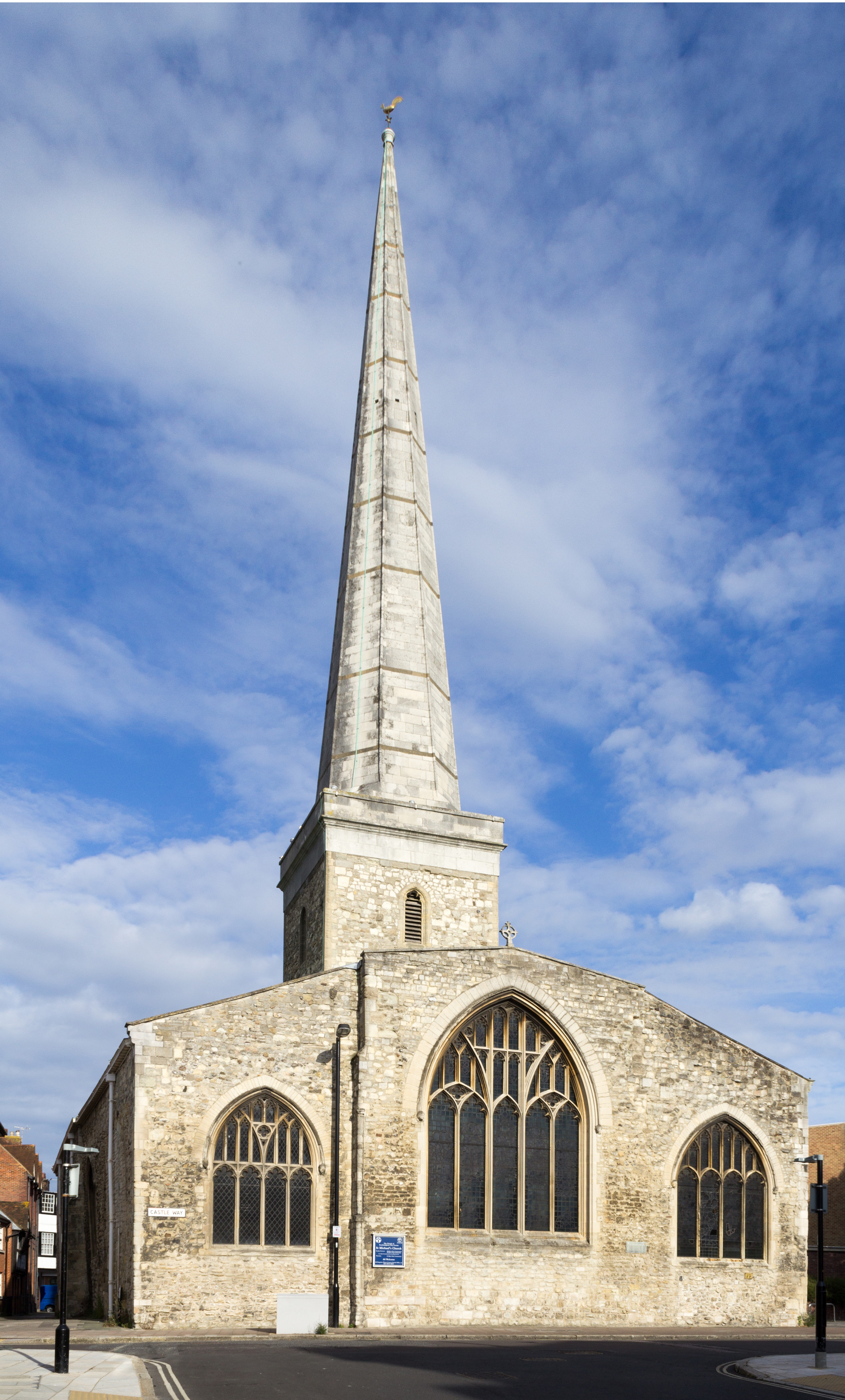
The Parish Church of St Michael

Southampton's prosperity was assured following the Norman Conquest in 1066, when it became the major port of transit between Winchester (the capital of England until the early 12th century) and Normandy. Domesday Book indicates that Southampton already had distinct French and English quarters at the time of the Norman Conquest and that the King owned a number of properties for which rent was payable.

Archaeological evidence has dated the foundation of St Michael's Church at 1070 and the church was dedicated to St Michael, patron saint of Normandy.

An Augustinian priory was founded at St Denys, on 364 acres (1.47 km^{2}) of land granted by Henry I, the last of the Norman Kings, in 1127. St Denys Priory continued as a religious house until its suppression in 1536.

== Medieval period (1154–1485) ==
Henry II, the first King of the House of Plantagenet, was a regular visitor to Southampton and established Southampton Castle. The Castle was principally used to store the King's wine. Surviving remains of 12th-century merchants’ houses such as King Johns House and Canute’s Palace are evidence of the wealth that existed in the town at this time. Archaeological excavations have revealed evidence of other houses of similar stature.

By the 13th century Southampton had become a leading port and was particularly involved in the trade in French wine and English wool. The Wool House was built in 1417 as a warehouse for the medieval wool trade with Flanders and Italy.

By 1173 the St Mary Magdalen leper Hospital was established to the north of the town. St Julians Hospital, otherwise known as God's House Hospital, was founded around 1196 by Gervase 'le Riche'. The Franciscan friary was later built alongside God's House hospital. Bowls was first played regularly on the green adjacent to God's House Hospital in 1299. The green still exists. It is the world's oldest surviving bowling green.

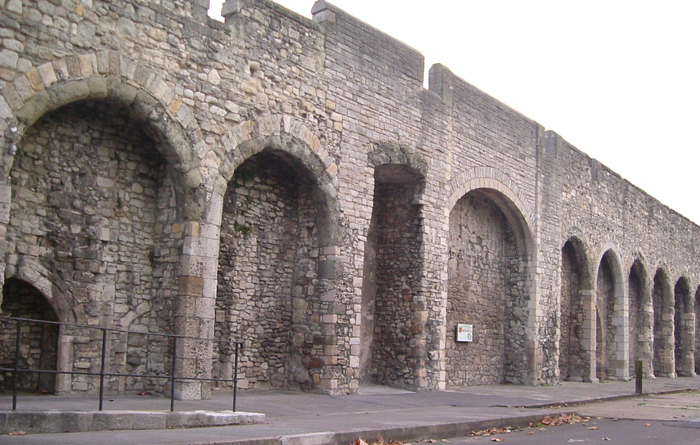
The medieval city wall

The town was sacked in 1338 by the French. Charles Grimaldi, purchaser of Monaco for the Grimaldi family, was involved in the raid and is said to have used the plunder to help found the principality of Monaco but no firm evidence exists to substantiate the claim. After this attack the city's walls, parts of which date from 1175, were extensively improved and reinforced. Lacking proper finance for the construction of a full defensive wall, the solution involved joining the existing exterior walls of existing merchant houses together to form part of the defensive structure. The city walls include God's House Tower, built in 1417, the first purpose-built artillery fortification in England. The walls were finally completed in the 15th century. A large part of the town's walls remain today. Over the years God's House Tower has been used as home to the city's gunner, the town gaol and as storage for the Southampton Harbour Board. Until September 2011 it housed the Museum of Archaeology.

The Black Death reached England in 1348 via the merchant vessels that regularly visited Southampton at that time.

The 12th-century Red Lion pub on the High Street below Bargate within the old walls is where in 1415, immediately prior to King Henry V of England's departure from Southampton to the Battle of Agincourt, the ringleaders of the 'Southampton Plot', Richard, Earl of Cambridge, Henry Scrope, 3rd Baron Scrope of Masham and Sir Thomas Grey of Heton, were tried and found guilty of high treason before being summarily executed outside Bargate.

During the Middle Ages shipbuilding became an increasingly important industry and was to remain so for centuries to come. The city became a county corporate in 1447.

== Tudor period (1485–1603) ==
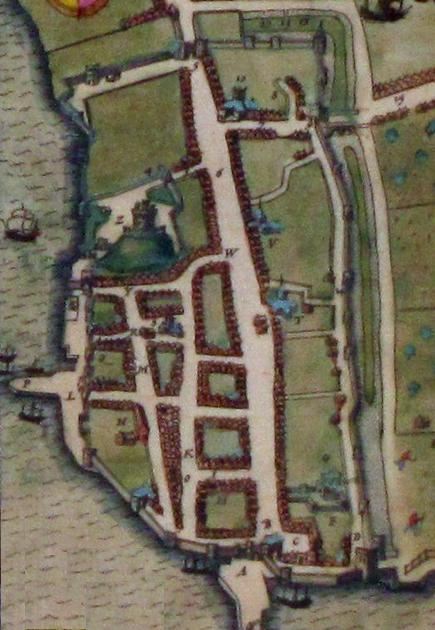
John Speed's 1612 map of Southampton

Southampton's Tudor House, otherwise known as Huttofts or Lady Ann Guidotti's House, was built in 1495 for Sir John Dawtry. It has been a family home and an artist's studio and has housed businesses including a dye-house and a bookbinder. It is now a museum.

Southampton's economic fortunes fluctuated during the Tudor period. From 1492 to 1531 all exports of tin and lead were required to pass through Southampton. Trade with the Channel Islands increased. In 1554 Southampton was granted a monopoly on the export of wool to the Mediterranean and on the import of sweet wine. At other times during this period, the port was in decline, mainly because trade was shifting to London. Southampton was also a convenient port for the buccaneers who plundered Spanish ships in the English Channel and the Atlantic Ocean.

The development of Hurst, Calshot, Cowes and Netley castles along Southampton Water and the Solent, by Henry VIII in about 1540, meant that Southampton was no longer so dependent upon its fortifications.

In 1553 the Free Grammar School off the Mayor Baliffs and Burgesses of the Towne and County of Southampton was granted letters patent by Edward VI, establishing the new school and thus fulfilling the legacy of William Capon, who left money for that purpose in his will. The school survives as King Edward VI School, Southampton.

== Stuart period (1603–1714) ==
The port was the original point of departure for the Pilgrim Fathers aboard the Mayflower in 1620. A memorial can be found on Town Quay. Since that time it has been the last port of call for millions of emigrants who left the Old World to start a new life in the US, Australia, Canada, New Zealand, South Africa, Barbados and other parts of the world.

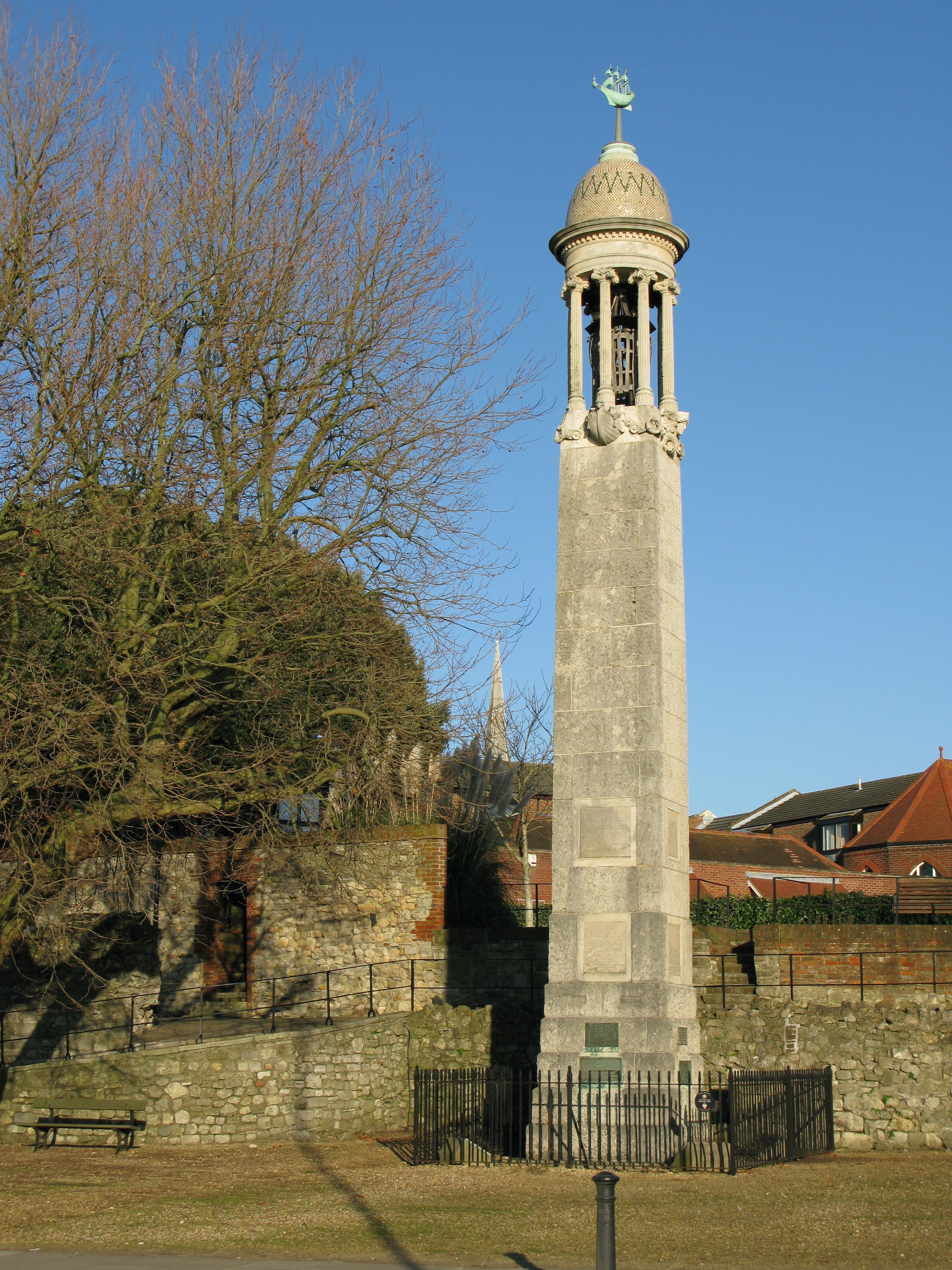
The Pilgrim Memorial, Town Quay

In 1642, during the English Civil War, a Parliamentary garrison moved into Southampton, initially to defend against seaborne attack from Royalist ships. A Royalist army advanced as far as Redbridge in March 1644 but were prevented from taking the town by Colonel Richard Norton. The Battle of Cheriton, also in March 1644, subsequently removed the threat to Southampton.

In June 1664 the Black Death returned to Southampton. This new plague seriously disrupted life and led the corporation to report that it was unable to continue governing the town. By the time the epidemic had ended in November 1666, 1700 people had died.

Isaac Watts the younger, born in Southampton in 1674, wrote the words of the hymn O God Our Help in Ages Past. His early education was at the Free Grammar School. He was a member of the Above Bar Independent Community. This non-conformist community was persecuted following the Act of Uniformity of 1662. Isaac Watts' father, also named Isaac, suffered periods of imprisonment in the Bargate.

In 1689 the right to vote in parliamentary elections, which had previously been limited to freemen, was extended to include those paying Scot and lot in Southampton.

== Georgian era (1714–1795) ==
=== Spa town ===
Southampton became a spa town in 1740, thanks to the discovery of a spring of chalybeate water. The area was laid out as Spa gardens and earned royal patronage. That further encouraged fashionable society to Southampton and aided its prosperity and development.

Southampton had also become a popular site for sea bathing by the 1760s, despite the lack of a good-quality beach. Innovative buildings specifically for this purpose were built at West Quay, with baths that were filled and emptied by the flow of the tide, one of which had an adjustable floor. The building, known as the Long Rooms, had a long promenade with views over the water to be enjoyed by spectators and bathers alike.

=== Polygon ===
The Polygon was an 18th-century residential and commercial development designed in 1768 by James Leroux which was aimed at Southampton's fashionable clientele. It was intended to be a development of 12 residential houses, with a hotel, shops, an assembly room and an ornamental lake. Three houses and the hotel were completed by 1773, but the scheme had financial problems and it was never completed. The buildings have since been demolished.

=== Coaching ===
The fashionable attractions of the town caused coaching traffic to increase. Several coaching inns were established in Southampton, including the Dolphin Hotel and the Star Hotel, and there was a great deal of competition for passengers and guests. The coaching trade continued until it was rendered obsolete by the arrival of the railway.

=== Canals ===
There was a great deal of interest in constructing canals, though this was only partially implemented.

In 1774, a canal between Eling and Salisbury was proposed, but was not built. In 1779, a canal linking Southampton (at Redbridge) to Andover was proposed.

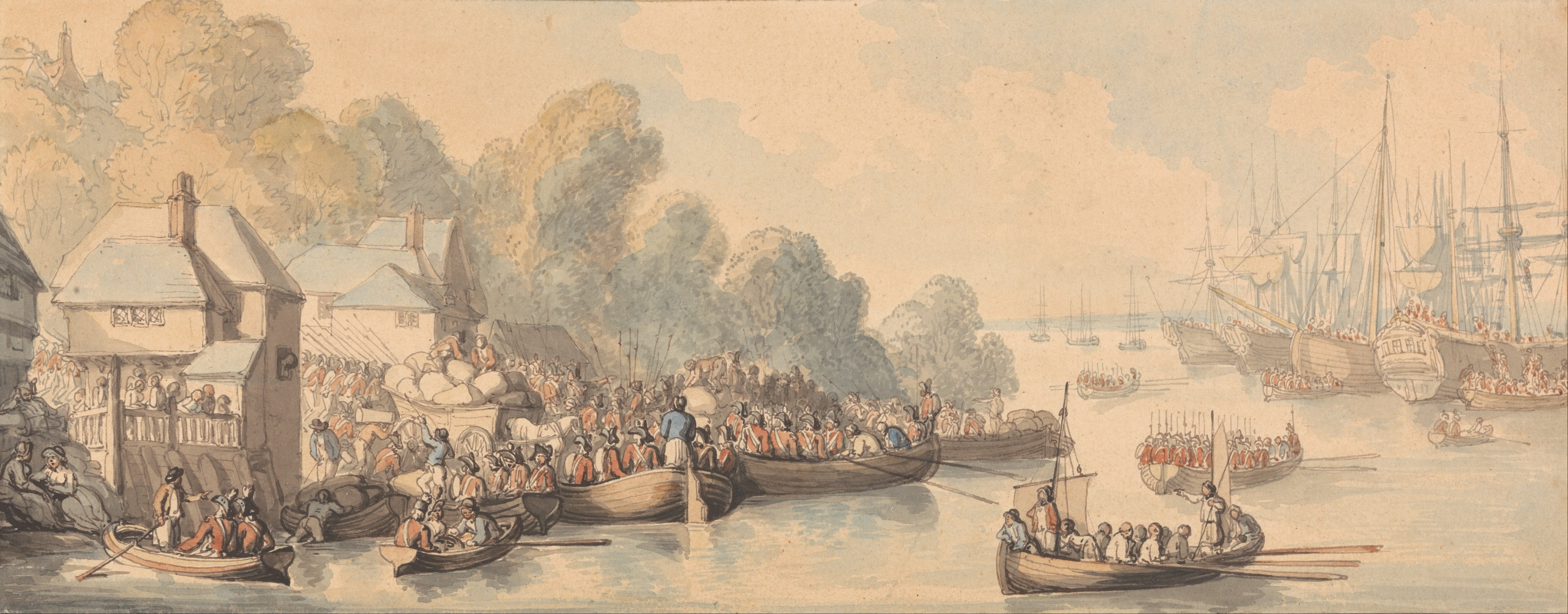
The embarkation of British troops at Southampton, by Thomas Rowlandson, 1794

The Redbridge to Andover canal was completed in 1796. In 1792, the proposal to link Southampton and Salisbury by canal gained new momentum. The plan was to build a new canal from Salisbury to connect with the Andover to Southampton canal at Kimbridge. The canal would then be extended from Redbridge into the centre of Southampton, passing through a tunnel under the Marlands, branching at Houndwell to serve both Northam and Town Quay. The tunnel was started but was never completed.

=== Industrial Revolution ===
Walter Taylor's 18th century mechanisation of the block-making process, in Southampton, was a significant step in the Industrial Revolution, winning him a monopoly on the supply of wooden rigging blocks for the Royal Navy from 1759 to 1803.

== Regency period (1795–1837) ==
For centuries, the only crossings of the river Itchen in this area were at Mansbridge, some distance upstream from Southampton, and at Itchen Ferry village. The Northam Bridge Company was formed in 1796. They built a toll bridge at Northam, which was opened in September 1799, and new roads connecting the bridge to Southampton and Botley, Hampshire. The town was further connected to Portsmouth via another toll bridge built at Bursledon and another road that linked Bursledon bridge to the new Northam to Botley road at Bitterne.

The Floating Bridge also connected Southampton to Woolston and Portsmouth on the east bank of the River Itchen in 1836.

Southampton was one of the boroughs reformed by the Municipal Corporations Act 1835 and contained the parishes of All Saints, Holy Rood, St John, St Lawrence, St Mary, St Michael, and part of South Stoneham.

A large fire broke out in Southampton in 1836 after starting in a bakery. Thomas Dowding helped in organising fire fighting in order to contain the blaze.

The painter John Everett Millais was born in the city in 1829. Southampton Solent University's art gallery is named Millais Gallery in his honour.

== Victorian era (1837–1901) ==
Southampton High Street in 1839.

There was competition between the two toll companies at Northam and Itchen, resulting in another new road on the east of the Itchen, connecting Woolston to Botley via Sholing and Hedge End.

The town experienced major expansion during the Victorian era. The Southampton Docks company was formed in 1835. In October 1838, the foundation stone of the docks was laid. The first dock opened on 29 August 1842. The Royal Mail Steam Packet Company operated its services from Southampton, officially designating the port as the packet station in May 1843. The structural and economic development of the docks continued for the next few decades.

The London and Southampton Railway was fully opened to Southampton Terminus in May 1840, although it had been operating as far as Winchester since June 1839, It was delayed by work on the chalk cutting between Winchester and Basingstoke. In 1847, Southampton was connected to Dorchester by the Southampton and Dorchester Railway. In 1866, a branch line extended the railway over the River Itchen at St Denys, passing through Bitterne and Woolston to Netley. This created further competition for the Floating Bridge company.

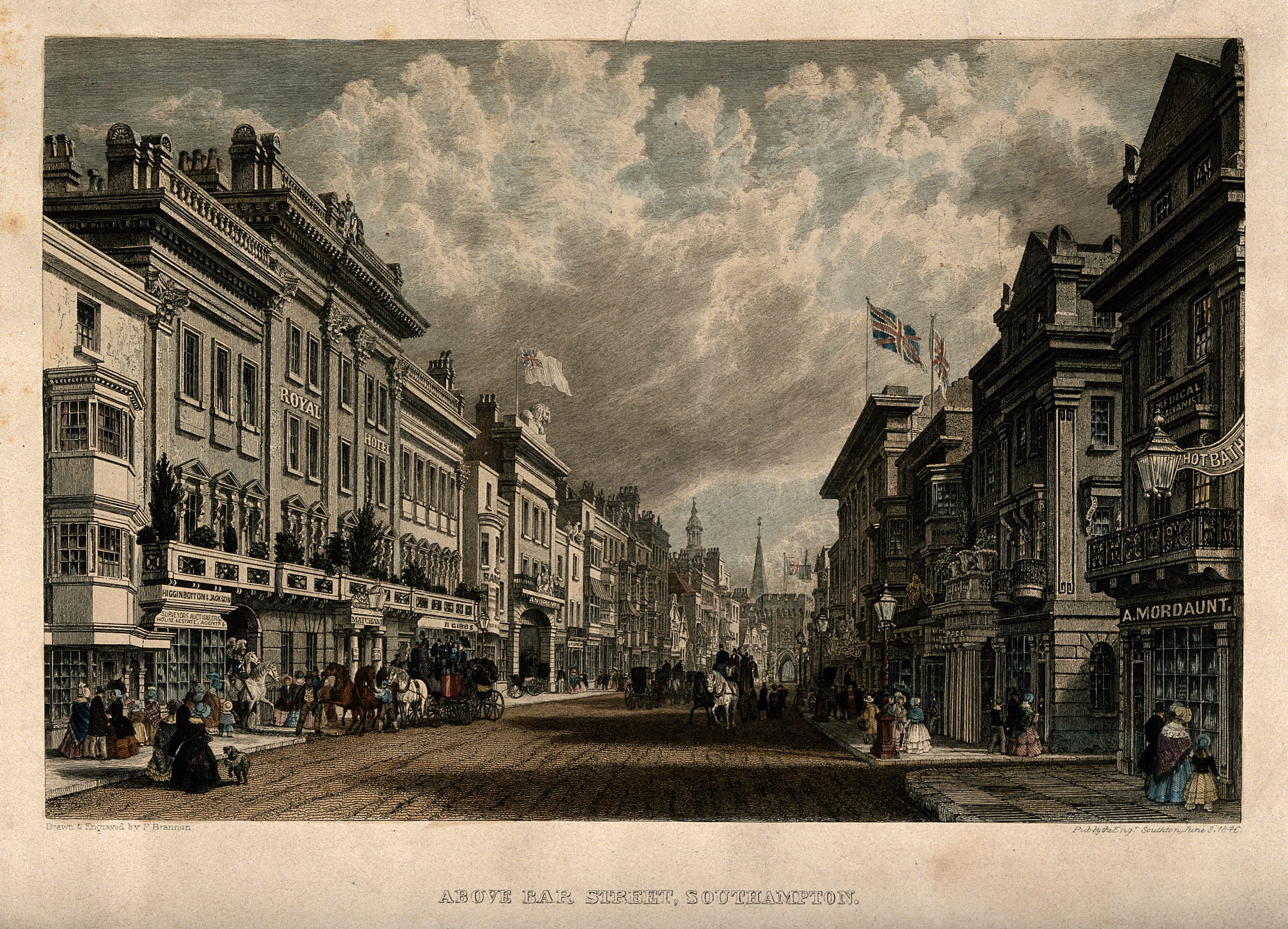
Bar Street in Southampton, 1846

With good transport links, Southampton became the emigrant station for North America and Canada in January 1844. The Southampton Emigration and Shipping Company was formed in 1846 Southampton subsequently became known as The Gateway to the Empire, with many emigrants passing through Southampton to start a new life in the United States and Canada, South Africa and Australia.

The town became a county borough under the Local Government Act 1888. In 1894, under the Local Government Act 1894, the part of South Stoneham, within the borough, became the parish of Portswood, in 1895 the parish of Shirley was added.

Cholera epidemics in 1848–49 and 1865 caused great concern. These outbreaks were centred on the slums of the old medieval town. Sewers were built in the 1840s and 1870s. In 1894, the Borough Medical Officer of Health published a report on poverty in the town. Population density in the slums at that time was recorded as 441.4 per acre (1,091/ha). The Simnel Street and West Quay Improvement plan subsequently cleared the area of slums, created new streets and a lodging house in St Michaels Square; it was called St Michaels House and opened in 1899.

== Edwardian period (1901–1914) ==
=== The Titanic disaster ===
In common with most of the luxury liners of the time, RMS Titanic sailed from Southampton. Most of the crew came from Southampton; 549 Sotonians died in the sinking. The Maritime museum in the old Wool House included an exhibition related to the vessel but this has since been moved and incorporated into the SeaCity Museum.

== World War I (1914–1918) ==
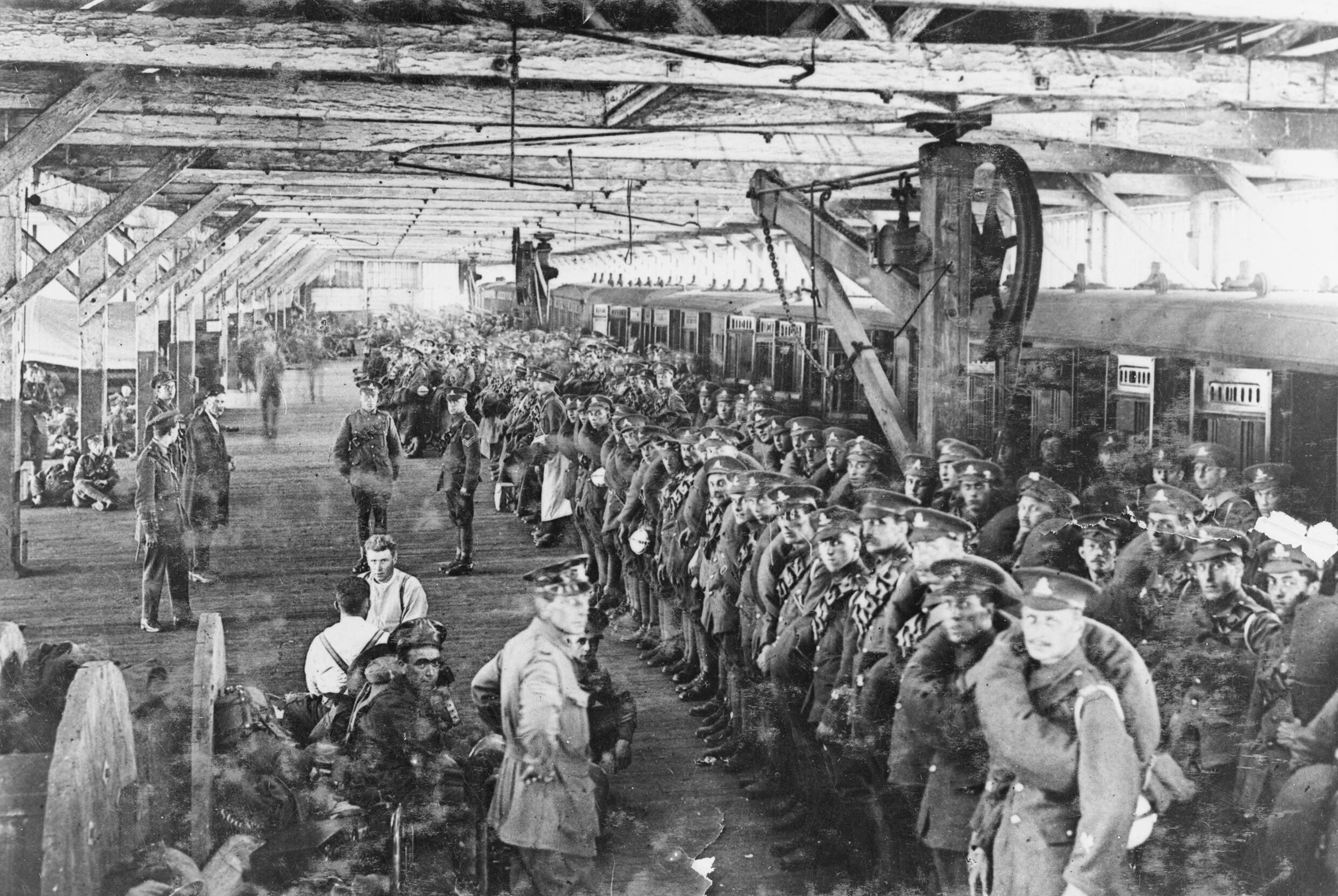
British troops in Southampton

Southampton was designated No. 1 Military Embarkation Port in August 1914. Much of Southampton Common was taken over by the military A total of 8,149,685 troops and their equipment departed for mainland Europe through the port. A steady flow of refugees, prisoners of war and 1,177,125 wounded came back to England through Southampton.

== Interwar period (1918–1939) ==
In 1919, soldiers returning from World War I mutinied in the port.

In 1920, Bitterne Parish Council and Itchen Urban District Council, which collectively covered the districts of Bitterne, Bitterne Manor, Bitterne Park, Woolston, Peartree Green, Sholing and Weston, were incorporated into the borough of Southampton. Bassett and Swaythling were incorporated into Southampton at the same time.

The period between the two World Wars saw an increase in the volume of traffic, as the motor car and Southampton Corporation Tramways evolved. It became essential to develop new routes around the Bargate as the central arch was too much of an obstruction. By 1931, a tram passed through the Bargate every 30 seconds and over the course of 14 hours, 2000 cars and 6000 bicycles would use the same narrow passage between Above Bar and the High Street. The photographs (below) illustrate the problem. Several old buildings and part of the medieval walls were demolished on both sides of the Bargate. In 1932, the Bargate was bypassed on its eastern side. The Bargate became an island when it was bypassed on its western side in 1938.

The Clock Tower, further up Above Bar at the junction with New Road, was relocated to Bitterne Park Triangle in 1934 to facilitate further road improvements.

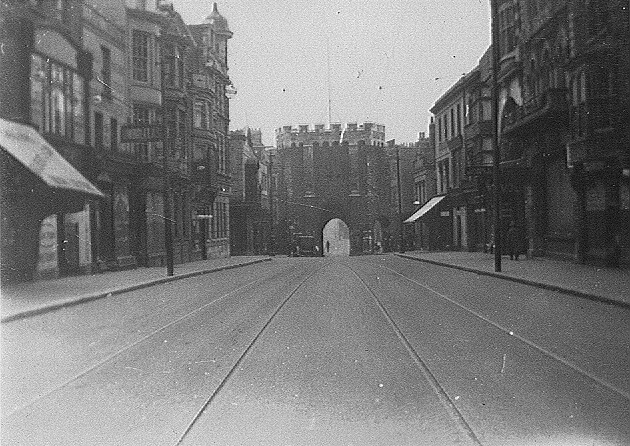
Above Bar, 1926

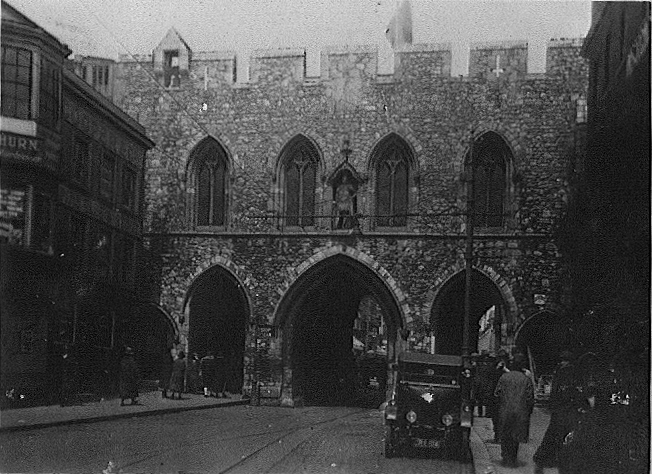
High Street, circa 1930

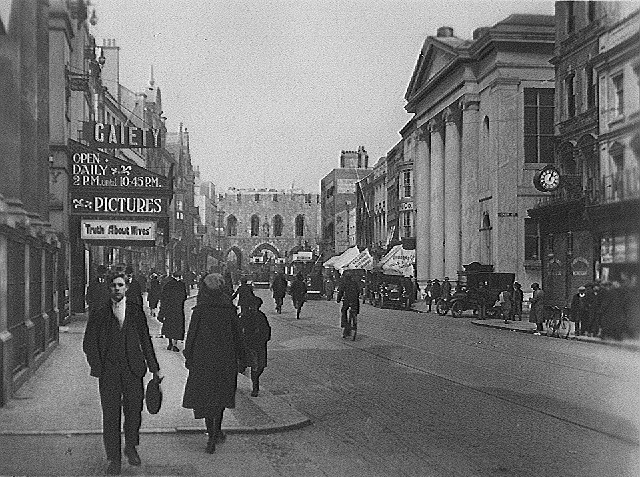
High Street, circa 1930, showing the Gaiety cinema

On 26 March 1929, Southampton Corporation purchased Northam Bridge from the Northam Bridge Company. On 16 May 1929, the tolls on that bridge were removed. At the same time, the tolls at Lances Hill, Hedge End and the bridge at Bursledon were also abolished. The only remaining toll in Southampton was at the Floating Bridge, which was eventually taken over by Southampton Corporation in 1934, remaining a toll-crossing until it closed in 1977.

== World War II (1939–1945) ==
=== Air raids ===
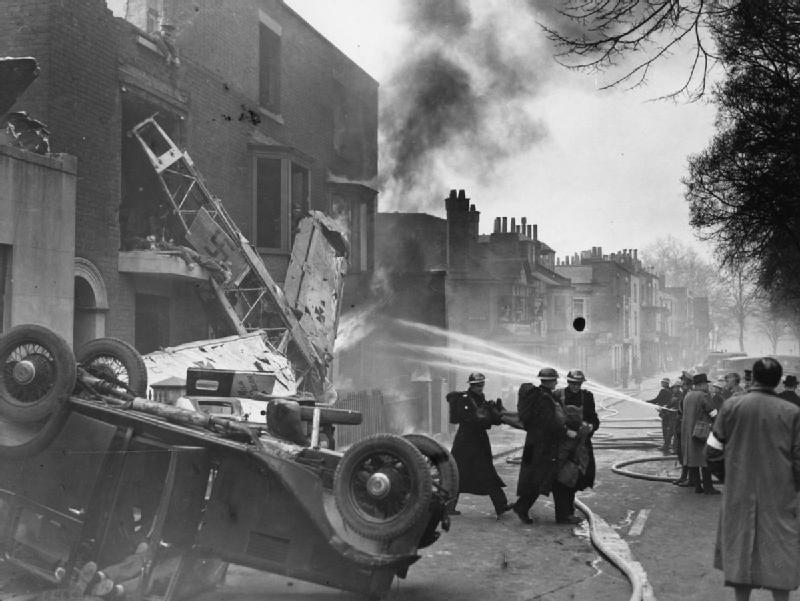
An air raid drill in February 1940

The Second World War hit Southampton particularly hard. Pockets of Georgian architecture remain, but much of the city was levelled during the Blitz of November 1940. 476 tons of bombs were dropped on the city by the Luftwaffe. Southampton was a prime target because of its general strategic importance as a major port and industrial area, and particularly because the Supermarine Spitfire was designed, developed and built in Southampton.

On 15 September 1940, the Supermarine factory in Woolston was bombed, killing many, though not damaging the factory. Two days later, the factory was destroyed. After the air raid Nazi propaganda declared that the town had been left a smoking ruin.

On 6 November 1940, during a raid on the town centre, three bombs hit the School of Art in the Civic Centre, (now known as the Art Gallery), killing students that were sheltering in the basement.

The main blitz, a series of sustained nighttime raids, started on 23 November 1940. There was a pause until 30 November, when the resumption of raids destroyed repairs that had made during the lull. The blitz continued on 1 December, but these raids were sporadic and smaller. A total of 137 people died during the period of the Blitz, of which 96 were lost to direct hits on public air raid shelters.

The accuracy of the locally based Ordnance Survey's maps did not go unrecognised by the Luftwaffe: German bomber pilots used them to bomb Southampton. One building that survived the bombing was Southampton's oldest, St Michaels Church. The spire was an important navigational aid for the German pilots and consequently they were ordered to avoid hitting it. Other buildings in Southampton were found to be used as aids to navigation; Elmfield flats in Millbrook had a flat concrete roof which was clearly visible from the air until it was grassed over.

There were 1,605 air raid warnings in Southampton, the last raid occurred on 5 November 1944. Only one flying bomb fell within the boundaries of Southampton, at Sholing on 12 July 1944.

=== D-Day and the Invasion of Europe ===
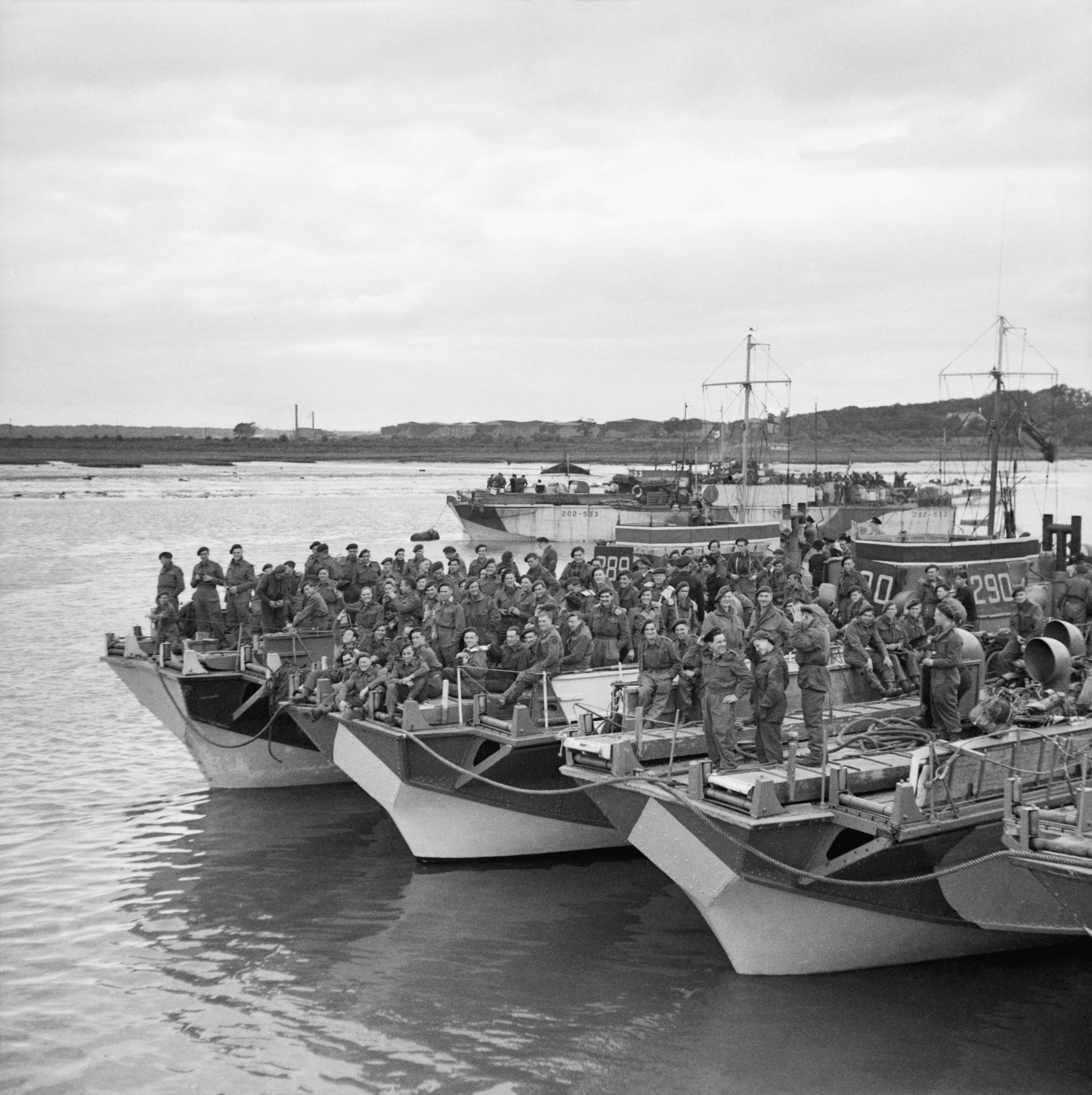
LCI(S)s moored at Southampton in the final preparations for D-Day

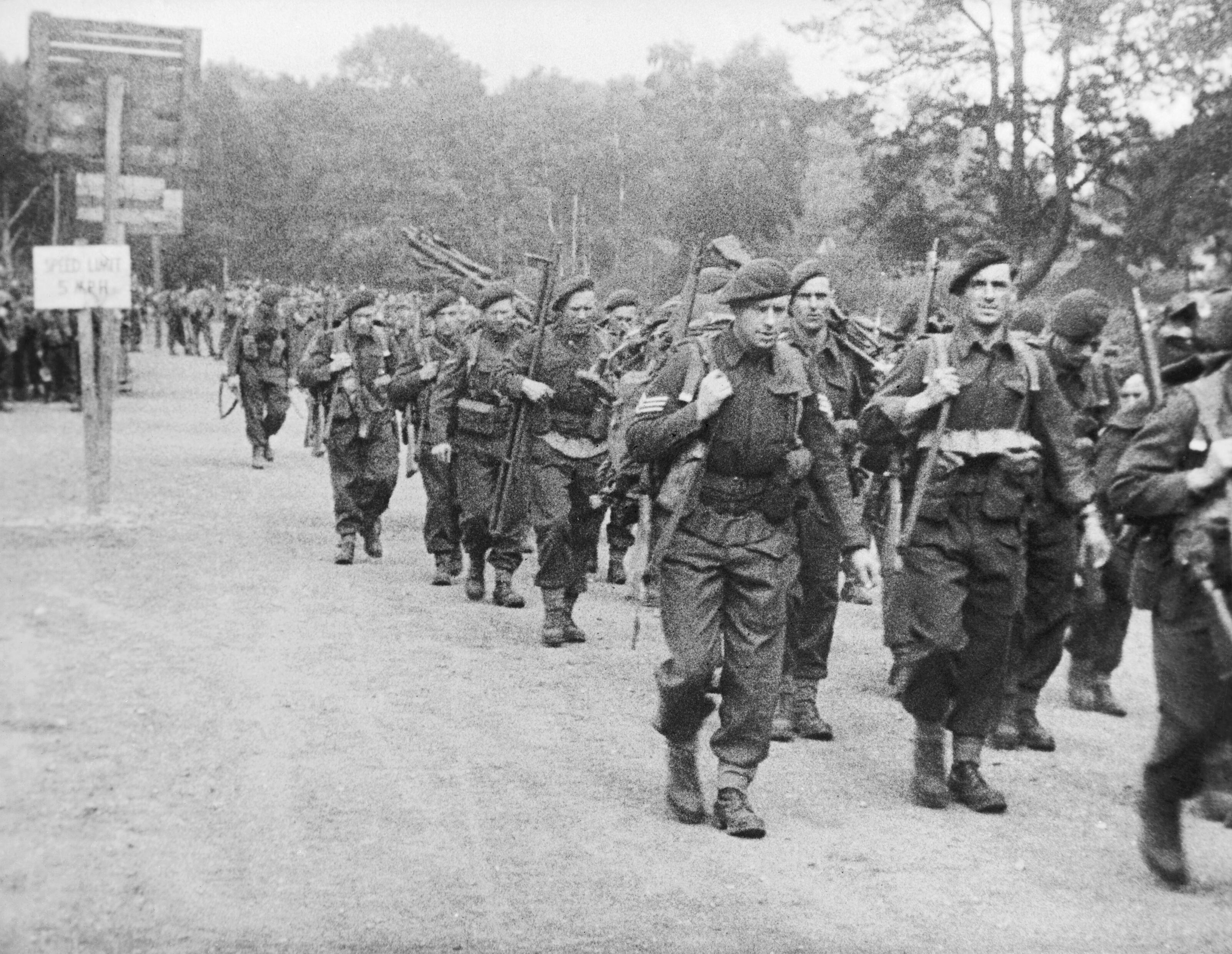
British soldiers marching to Southampton for embarkation to Normandy, June 1944

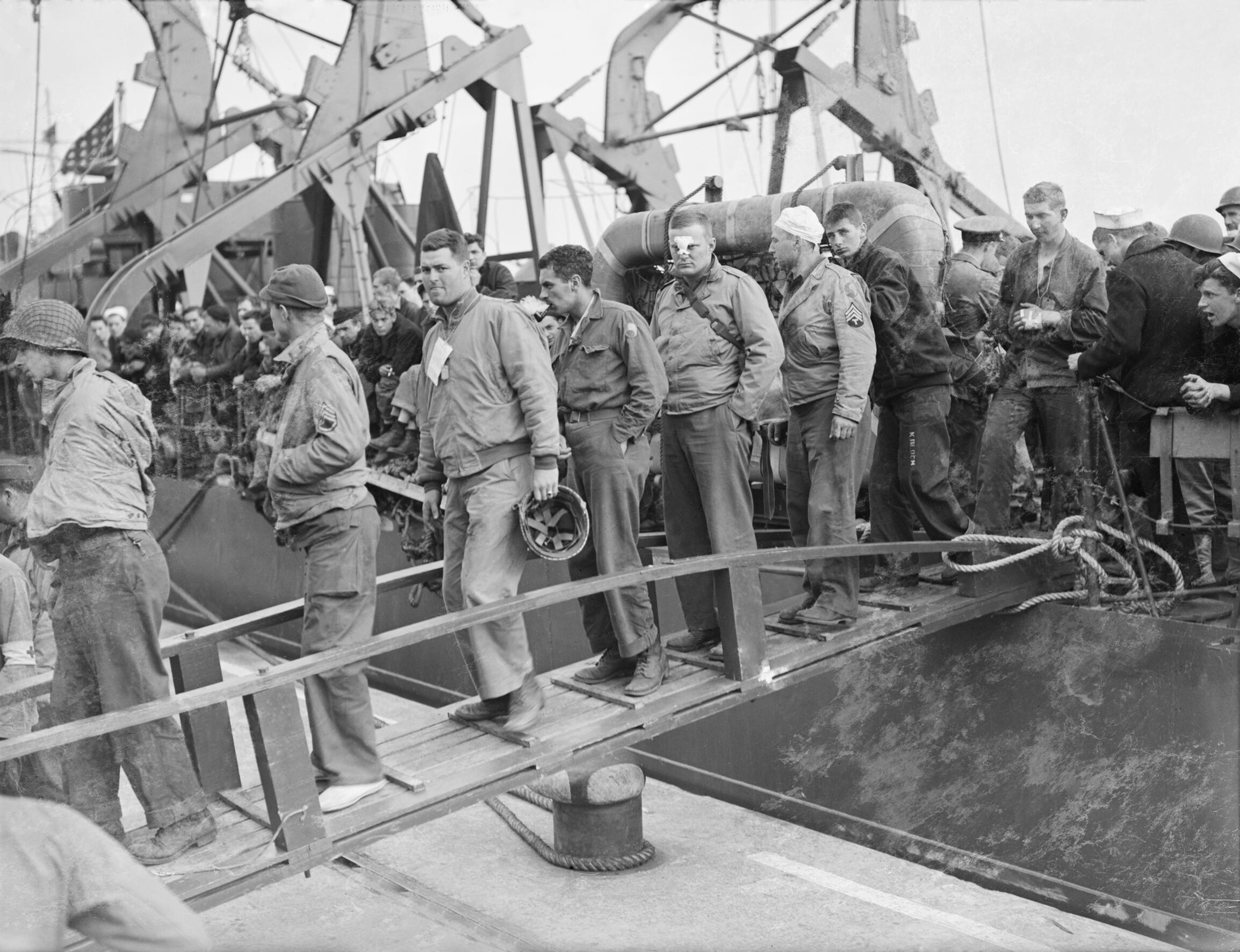
American soldiers wounded in Normandy in Southampton, June 1944

In July 1943, military exercise Harlequin tested the ports' capacity for embarking troops and equipment. Original estimates were that 11,000 troops could be embarked on each high tide. The exercise showed that 44,000 troops could be handled. By D-Day, that figure had increased to 53,750 troops and 7070 vehicles, aided by the construction of additional facilities specifically with D-Day in mind.

Besides the embarkation of troops, Southampton was used for other purposes in the preparations for the Invasion of Europe. US servicemen and Lend Lease imports arrived at the docks. Sections of Mulberry Harbour were constructed in the harbour. A planning team for the Operation Pluto pipelines that provided fuel to the Normandy sector was based at HMS Abatos.

Southampton was at the heart of Area C, a huge marshalling area in southern Hampshire, which extended as far north as Winchester. Detailed maps of the time show that within Area C, Sub-area Z extended around the north of Southampton and as far as Hedge End in the east. There were military camps on the common, Harefield, Thornhill, and Netley Common. The maps even show that there were Chemical Warfare dumps to the north of the town.The town centre, the docks, Woolston and Weston were part of Embarkation Area C5. The plan was that troops and equipment would be assembled in the camps in sub-areas W, X, Y and Z then brought to the embarkation area to be loaded aboard the ships that were waiting there. That plan was tested in May 1944, during Operation Fabius, with troops that passed through Southampton rehearsing their landings at Hayling Island, Bracklesham Bay and Littlehampton

After D-Day Southampton continued to work at full capacity to re-supply the Allied Forces on mainland Europe.

From 1 April to 25 August 1944, Southampton was within Regulated Area (No 2), which placed the local population under certain restrictions that were intended to secure the military operation.

=== Homecoming ===
At the end of the war, Southampton was a key port for the repatriation of troops and prisoners of war. The first 1,534 British prisoners of war to be repatriated from Japan arrived in Southampton aboard the Corfu on 7 October 1945. The Corfu was one of fifteen ships repatriating prisoners from the Far East, and the prisoners aboard were from around 50 various regiments. The ex-prisoners were provided with tea, cake and fruit in decorated huts on the quay and then driven in army vehicles to a reception camp on Southampton Common where they would spend their first night back on British soil.

== Post-war (1945–2000) ==
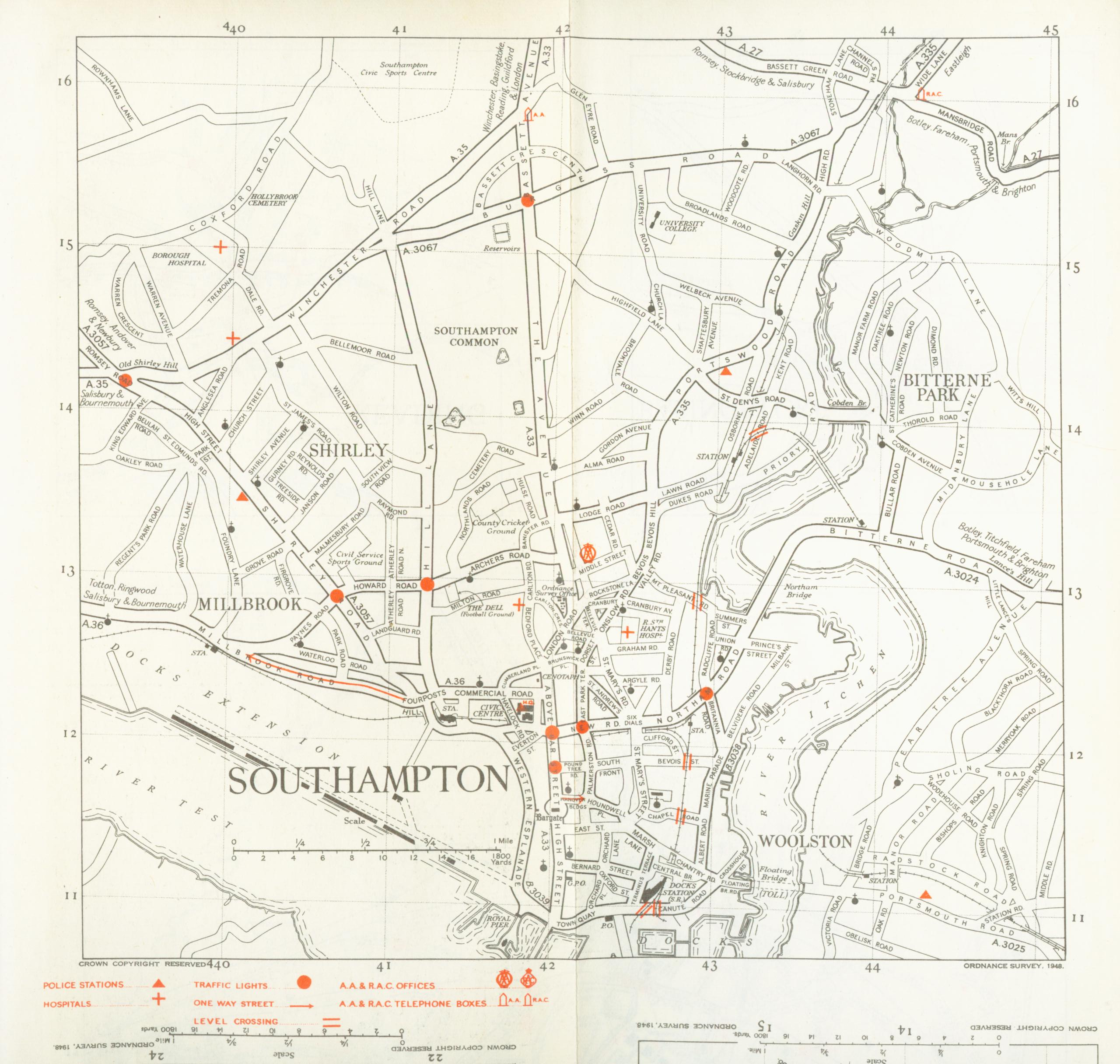
A road map of Southampton from 1948

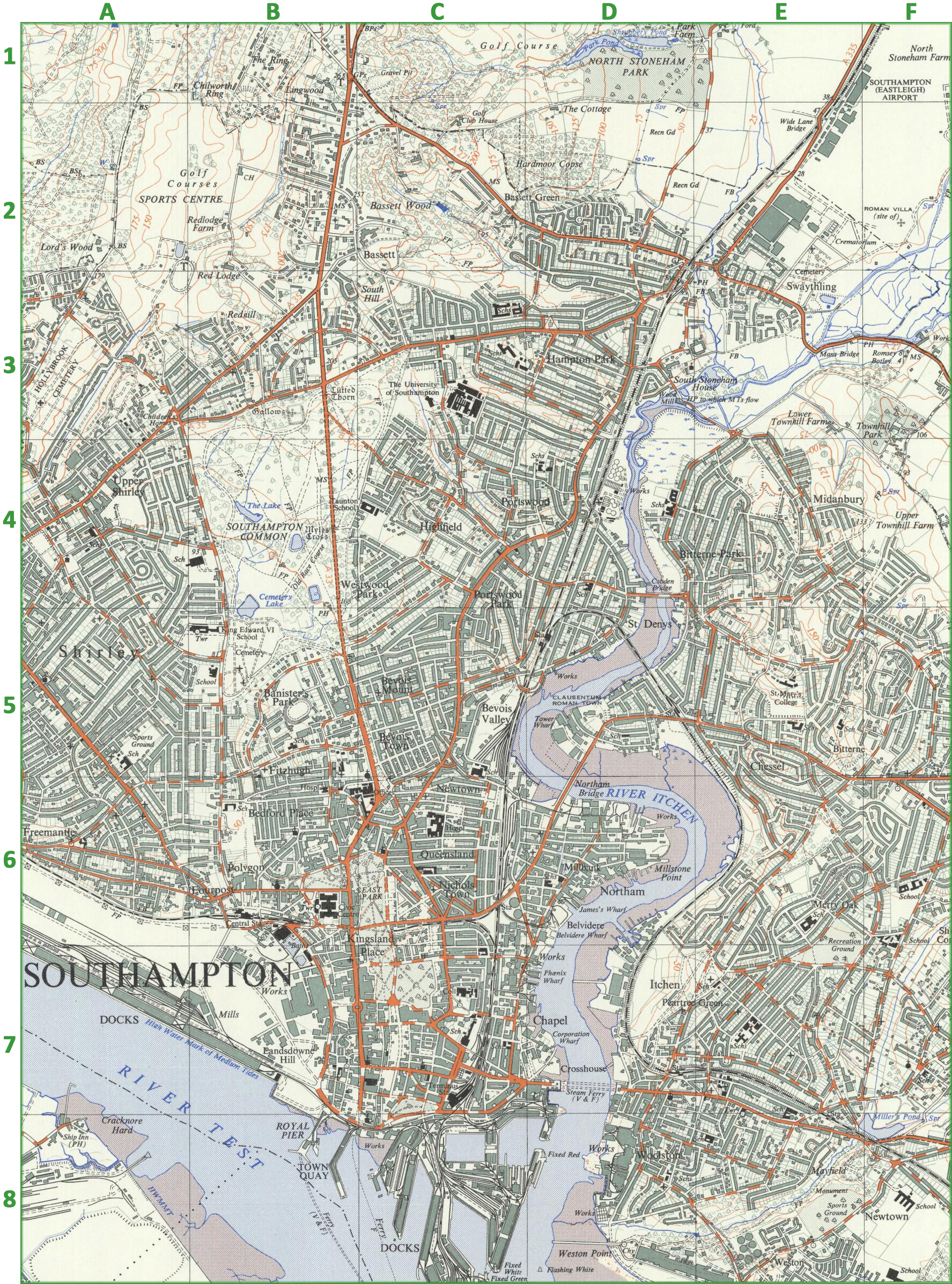
Ordnance Survey map of Southampton urban area 1961. Squares are appx 1 km

The Second World War had a profound impact on the city due to the destruction of a lot of the city's buildings, leading to a massive regeneration program. These buildings were cheaply constructed in order to rebuild quickly, having a negative effect on the architectural quality in the city. Southampton was awarded city status in 1964 by Letters Patent. In 1967, Southampton took in part of the Nursling and Rownhams parishes. The boundaries have been largely unchanged since. Southampton lost its County Borough status under the Local Government Act 1972, becoming a non-metropolitan district.

It became a Unitary Authority in 1997, administratively independent of Hampshire County Council, following the Banham Review.

On 29 April 1952, the Hartley University College was granted a Royal Charter to give the University of Southampton full university status. The university's Southampton School of Medicine was opened in 1971.

== 21st century (2001–present) ==
Southampton is still an important passenger port, frequented by ships such as P&O's MV Oriana, and Cunard Line's RMS Queen Mary 2, MS Queen Victoria and MS Queen Elizabeth. It is the busiest cruise-ship terminal in the UK and also handles the majority of vehicle imports into the country.

In 2012, a century after the RMS Titanic disaster, the city council opened the SeaCity Museum.

In the 2010s several developments to the inner city of Southampton were completed. In 2016 the south section of West Quay, or West Quay South, originally known as West Quay Watermark, was opened to the public. Its public plaza has been used for several annual events, such as an ice skating rink during the winter season, and a public broadcast of the Wimbledon tennis championship. The response to the architecture of the building was positive as it received two awards from the Prix Versailles ceremony, winning "Best Shopping Centre Worldwide" and "best European Shopping Centre Design". Two new buildings, the John Hansard Gallery with City Eye and a secondary site for the University of Southampton's Nuffield Theatre, in addition to several flats, have been built in the "cultural quarter" adjacent to Guildhall Square in 2017. The buildings had been developing for over a decade due to different architects and investors being involved and then leaving the project. The first exhibition was from German artist Gerhard Richter. In 2019 the retail and accommodation-based "Bargate quarter" redevelopment, replacing the demolished Bargate shopping centre, and enabling public access to the previously hidden sections of the city walls, will be opened. Due to the investment in these areas of business and culture, and the development of several start-up businesses, PricewaterhouseCoopers and Demos ranked the city third "best city" in their Good Growth for Cities report.

In November 2017 the council selected an official flag for the city through a competition to design one and then a vote on the most popular design.

Several annual events occur within the city. Fun runs have become a popular occurrence within the city: The park run which began in 2004 The Southampton Marathon which has run for many years and attracts 40,000 runners. and the MoRun, a charity run, beginning in 2018. The mass cycling event "Let's Ride", previously known as "Sky Ride", attracts thousands of cyclists for a 6 km (3.7 mi) route. Since 2008 the council has run the "Music in the City" event in which hundreds of musicians perform in venues and on constructed stages around the city centre. Common People, a 2 date festival run by the organisers of the Dorset-based Bestival, has run in the Southampton Common since 2015. Southampton's pride parade began in 2017, having up to 15,000 participants in 2018.

Several public demonstrations occurred within the city in "solidarity" with larger national demonstrations. As part of nationwide 2017 Women's March, taking place in line with the inauguration of Donald Trump as president of the United States a half-hour public reading was organised in the city. Similarly in June 2018 an anti-austerity rally occurred simultaneously with the major demonstration in London. There was also a protest against Donald Trump's state visit to the United Kingdom in July that same year.

== Memorials ==
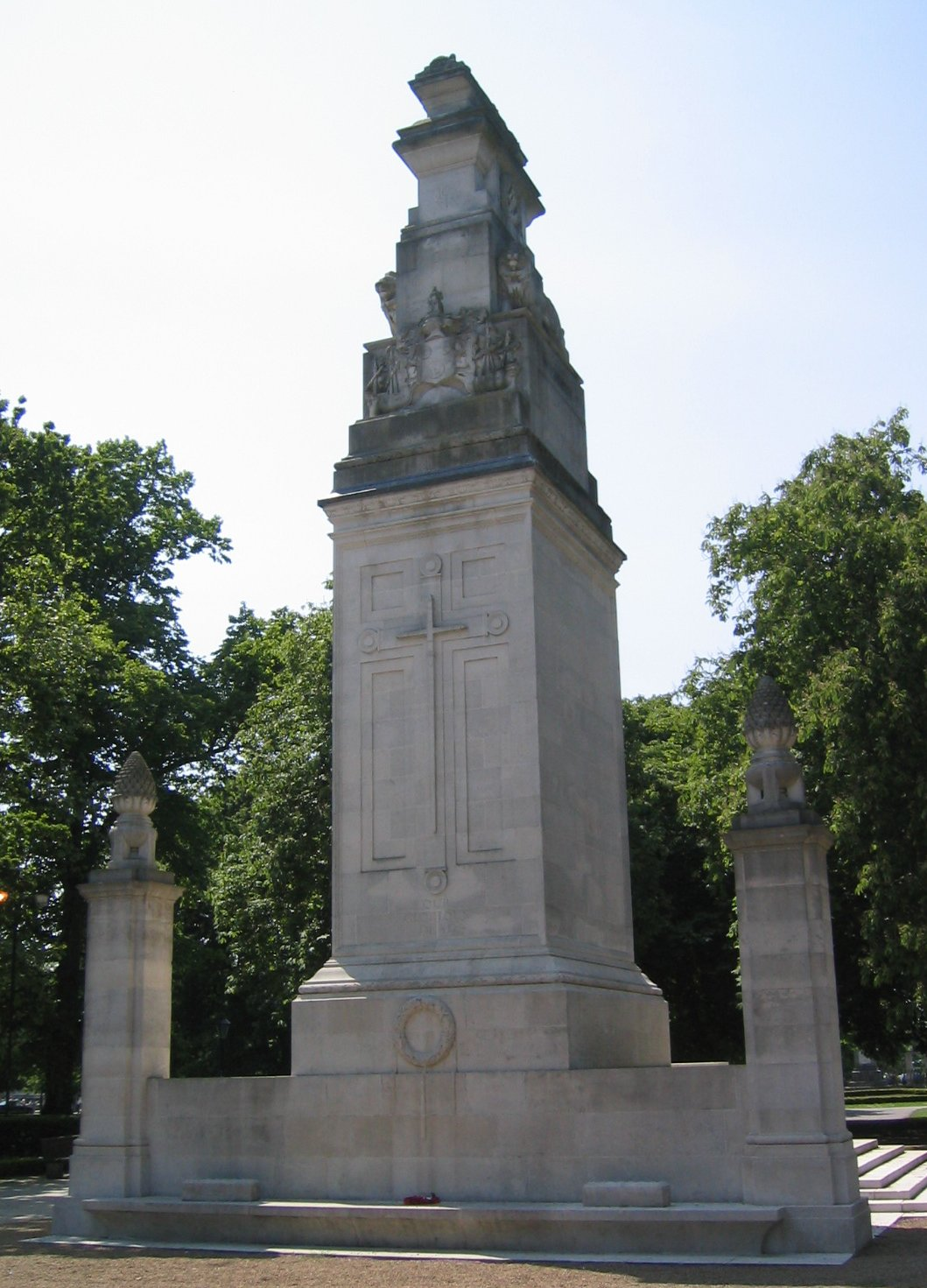
The Cenotaph, West (Watts) Park

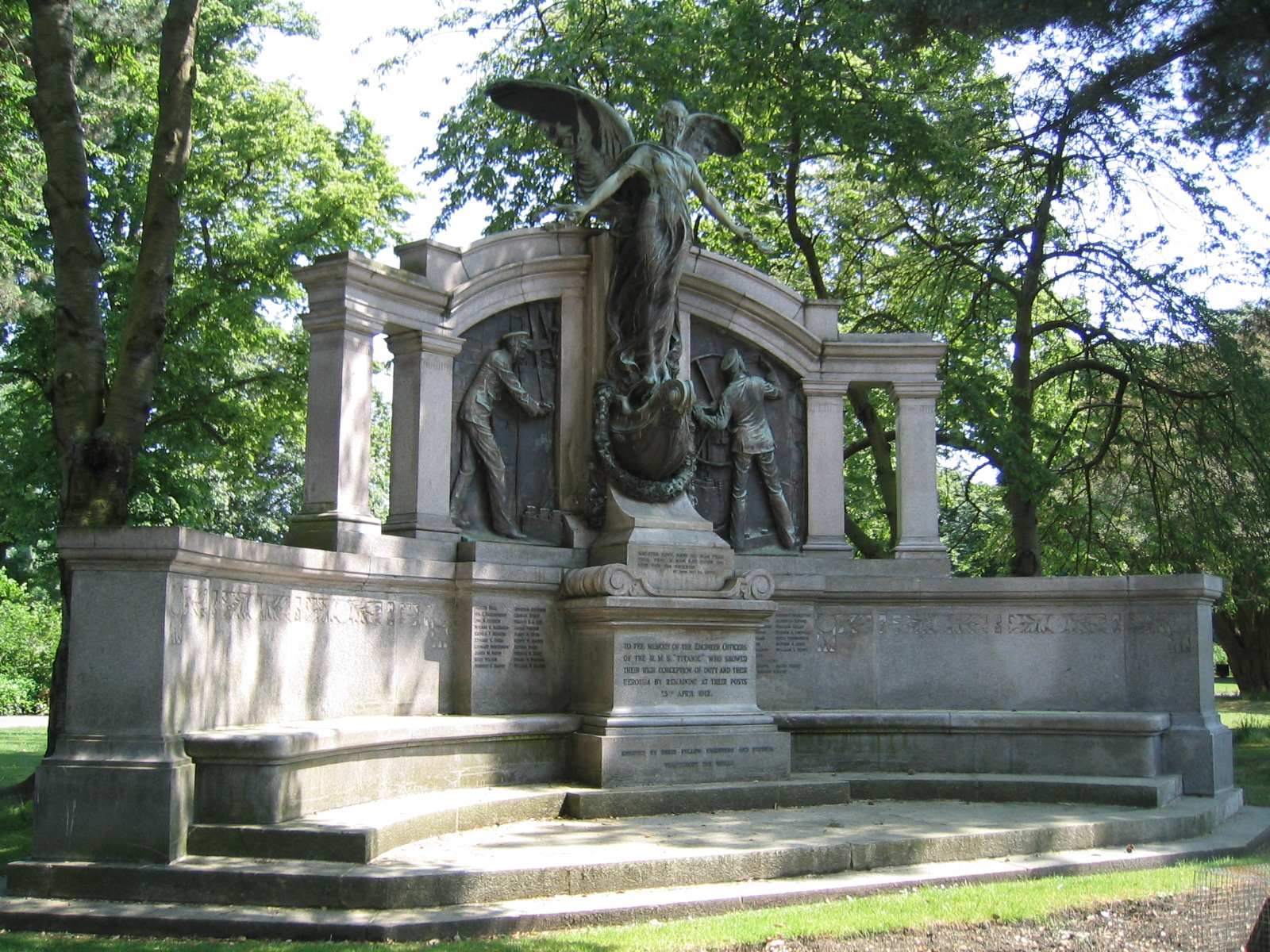
The memorial to the engineers of the RMS Titanic.

=== The Cenotaph ===
The city is home to Sir Edwin Lutyens' first permanent cenotaph, which was the basis for his design of the cenotaph memorial in Whitehall, London, a memorial to the city's dead of World War I. When it was unveiled on 6 November 1920, it had 1,800 names, later 2,008 names. It can be found in Watts (West) Park, opposite the Titanic engineers memorial.

=== Titanic ===
A memorial to the engineers of the RMS Titanic may be found in Andrews (East) Park, on Above Bar Street. There is a memorial to the musicians who played on the Titanic on the corner of Above Bar St and Cumberland Place.

=== Isaac Watts ===
The Watts memorial in the city's West Park, also known as the Watts Park, was unveiled in 1861. The melody of his famous Hymn, "O God our help in Ages Past" can be heard when the Civic Centre clock chimes.

== Places of worship (past and present) ==
=== St Mary's Church ===
St Mary's Church is the largest church in the city and can trace its origins to the first Saxon settlements of the 7th century.

=== St Michael's Church ===
Construction of St Michael's Church is thought to have been commenced in 1070; the building has been added to many times over the centuries, but its central tower dates from Norman times.

=== Holyrood ===
Holyrood Church was one of the original five churches serving the walled town. Built in 1320, the church was destroyed by enemy bombing during the blitz in November 1940. In 1957 the shell of the church was dedicated as a memorial to the sailors of the Merchant Navy. In 2004, it received funding from the Heritage Lottery Fund and the Merchant Navy Association to make the remaining structure more stable and usable.

== Aviation history ==
=== Supermarine ===
The Spitfire was developed and initially manufactured in the suburb of Woolston. Its designer, Reginald Mitchell, grew up in Stoke-on-Trent, then had a house in Russell Place in Highfield suburb near the university (now identified by a memorial plaque). The plane was a direct descendant of experimental aircraft built by Supermarine that competed in the Schneider Trophy in the 1930s. Supermarine was taken over by Vickers in 1928. Mitchell's short life is documented in the film The First of the Few.

=== Other ===
There were many aircraft companies based around Hamble, to the east of the town, from the 1930s to the 1950s, including Folland Aviation, started by Henry P. Folland, the former chief designer of Gloster Aircraft. Folland was taken over by Hawker Siddeley in 1960, and later became British Aerospace, the factory built the Gnat, Hawk and Harrier. The history of the area's contribution to aviation is celebrated at Solent Sky (formerly Southampton Hall of Aviation), near Itchen Bridge, and opposite the erstwhile site of the Woolston Supermarine factory. Imperial Airways and its successor, BOAC, had a flying boat base in the docks serving British colonial possessions in Africa and Asia in the 1930s and 1940s. Aquila Airways then used Berth 50 until they ended operations in late 1958. Nearby, Calshot Spit was a base for military flying boat operations and servicing.

== Shipbuilding history ==
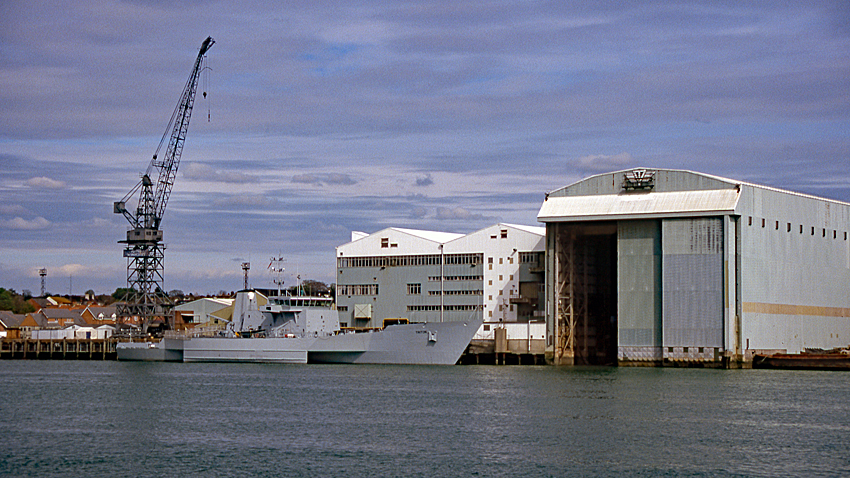
Vosper Thornycroft shipyard, Woolston

=== Vosper Thornycroft ===
The John I. Thornycroft & Company shipyard was the major employer in Woolston from 1904 to 2004. The yard built and repaired many ships for the Royal Navy and was particularly busy during the two World Wars. John I. Thornycroft & Company merged with Vosper & Co. in 1966 to become Vosper Thornycroft. Subsequently renamed VT Group, the yard closed in 2004 when the business relocated to Portsmouth.

=== Day, Summers & Co. ===
The Day Summers & Co. shipyard at Northam, originally the Northam Iron works launched its first iron steam ship in October 1840 and proceeded to build mail ships for expanding services that operated from Southampton's newly developed docks. Subsequently, the firm built a number of specialized vessels, including a submarine Incognita and luxury steam yachts. During World War I, the yard built tugs, minesweepers and refrigerated barges. The yard closed in January 1929, its last project being floating bridge number 10, launched in 1928.

== Transport history ==
=== Floating Bridge ===
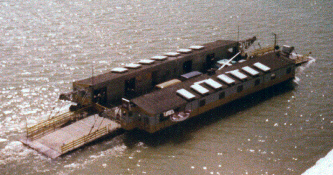
The Floating Bridge in June 1977

The floating bridge was opened in 1836 and connected Southampton to Woolston At that time Woolston was a separate village on the east bank of the River Itchen; it did not become part of Southampton until 1920. Originally owned by a private company, the Floating Bridge was purchased by Southampton Corporation in 1934. This service continued until 1977 when the Itchen Bridge was opened.

=== Trams ===
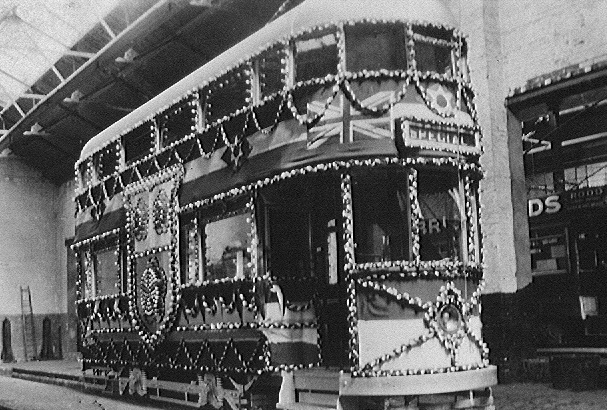
Southampton Corporation tram decorated for the Duke of York's visit to Southampton in July 1930

Horse-drawn trams appeared in Southampton in 1879. Electrified trams were introduced in 1900. From 1908, Southampton Corporation built most of its own trams at its works in Portswood. In 1923, some specially designed trams were introduced. These had unique rounded roofs which allowed them to pass through the centre arch of the Bargate. During World War II, Southamptons Trams were parked overnight in sidings on the Common instead of in the terminus buildings located around the city. From 1942 they were painted battleship grey. Because of those precautions, only one tram was lost to enemy bombing. The tram system did not extend very far into the eastern part of the city, passing over the River Itchen and Cobden Bridge and connecting with Bitterne Railway Station. Suburbs that were newly incorporated into the town in 1920 were always served by buses instead of trams. Southampton's trams were gradually taken out of service during 1948 and 1949, with the final tram running on 31 December 1949.

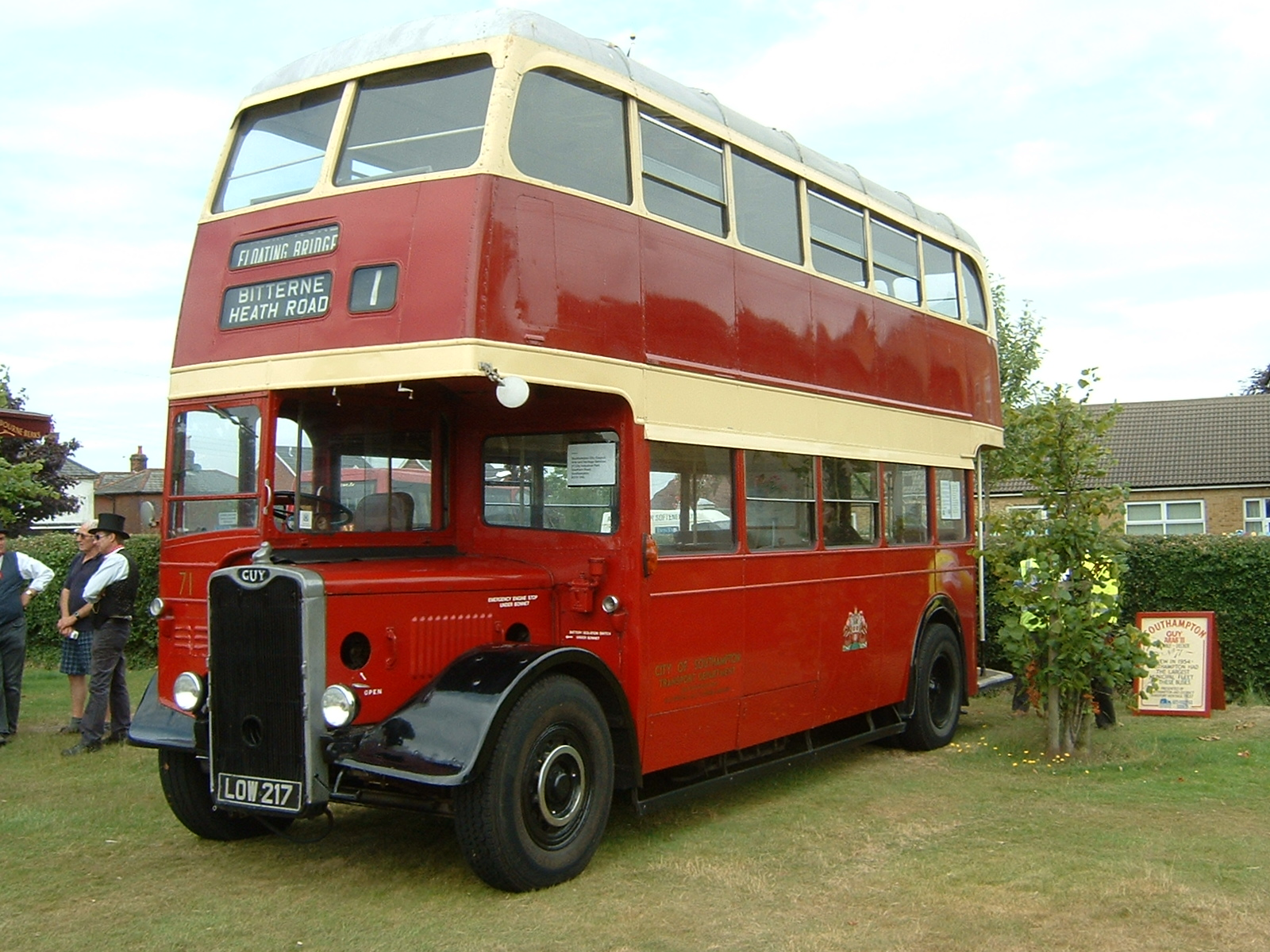
1954 Guy Arab in Southampton Corporation Livery

=== Buses ===
Southamptons trams were superseded by a fleet of diesel engined buses, though buses had previously been in service in some parts of the City which were not serviced by trams. Some surviving buses dating back to the 1949 are looked after by Southampton & District Transport Heritage Trust.

=== Railways ===
The railway arrived in Southampton in 1839 The first permanent station was Southampton Terminus situated near Canute Road. Originally, trains terminated at a temporary structure at Northam. In 1847, Southampton Terminus was linked to Dorchester via the Southampton and Dorchester Railway and in 1866 it was extended to an additional line that served Netley and later Netley Hospital. On 2 September 1889, an extension to Fareham was opened and it became what is now the Southampton to Fareham Line.

The Didcot, Newbury and Southampton Railway was originally intended to run on a separate competing route from Winchester to a new station north of the Royal Pier. Deposited plans show the route entering the town from Winchester via a tunnel in Chilworth near the current Chilworth Arms Public house before passing through Lordswood and running down the east side of Dale Valley. From here it was to pass under Winchester Road, running to the east of the current St James' Park, Southampton through land now occupied by Shirley Junior School, then run south east close to the current Wilton Road to cross to the east of Hill Lane near Archers Road. Construction of an embankment and viaduct commenced to the East of Hill Lane before the scheme was abandoned. The Dell was subsequently built on part of the cleared land between Archers Road and Milton Road and the unused embankment remains behind properties to the East of Hill Lane between Milton Road and Commercial Road. Ultimately the line was connected to the existing London and South Western Railway route at Shawford Junction South of Winchester in 1891, and a separate line into Southampton was never built.

In 1892, the London and South Western Railway Company purchased Southampton Docks. By 1897, the existing Southampton Terminus, the South Western Hotel, a large goods yard and a turntable had all been established, with railway lines running across Canute Road and into every corner of the docks. The interaction between trains and other traffic was controlled by men with red flags. This close relationship between the docks and the railways allowed specialist Boat Train services to be developed that connected with the transatlantic liners, trains ultimately terminating at full-length platforms housed within the Ocean Terminal. Trains also ran directly on to the Royal Pier to connect with ferry services to Portsmouth, Ryde and Cowes. The nearby Cattle Market was also well served by the railway. The decline of transatlantic passenger liners in favour of quicker air routes, the development of Southampton Container Terminal, which transferred dock traffic to Millbrook and the electrification of the South West Main Line to London, all affected the economics of Southampton Terminus. Passenger services ceased on 9 September 1966 but the terminus continued to be used for parcels until March 1968. Southampton Central, originally Southampton West, is now the main railway station for Southampton.

== Football club ==
Southampton is home to Southampton F.C. the professional football club formed in 1885 with its origins in the football team of the St Mary's Church Young Men's Association. Since moving from its former ground 'The Dell' in 2001, the club is now based at St Mary's Stadium close to its original home. It also has a training and development centre at Staplewood, near Marchwood, on the edge of the New Forest. Southampton FC spent very many years competing in the lower divisions of the Football League but since 1966 it has generally competed in the higher levels of professional football.

The club's principal prize was its FA Cup win over Manchester United in 1976. The club was one of the founding members of the Premiership in 1992–93. The club was out of the top flight of football from 2005 until 2012 during which time the company owning the club went into administration but its fortunes were revived following purchase by the Swiss billionaire, Markus Liebherr, and from 2012-13 until 2023 the club has competed in the Premier League.

== See also ==
- Timeline of Southampton

== Bibliography ==
- Brown, Jim (2004). The Illustrated history of Southampton's Suburbs. DB. ISBN 1-85983-405-1.
- Coles, R.J. (1981). Southampton's Historic Buildings. City of Southampton Society.
- Doughty, Martin (1994). Hampshire and D-Day. Hampshire Books. ISBN 1-85741-047-5.
- Mitchell, Vic; Smith, Keith (1986). South Coast Railways: Portsmouth to Southampton. Middleton Press. ISBN 0-905392-93-0.
- Petch, Martin (1994). Southampton Tramways. Middleton Press. ISBN 1-873793-33-2.
- Rance, Adrian (1986). Southampton. An Illustrated History. Milestone. ISBN 0-903852-95-0.
- Robertson, Kevin; Oppitz, Leslie (1988). Hampshire Railways Remembered. Countryside Books. ISBN 0-905392-93-0.
