= Hedge End =

Neighbourhood of Eastleigh, Hampshire, England

Coordinates: 50.9135°N 1.3041°W

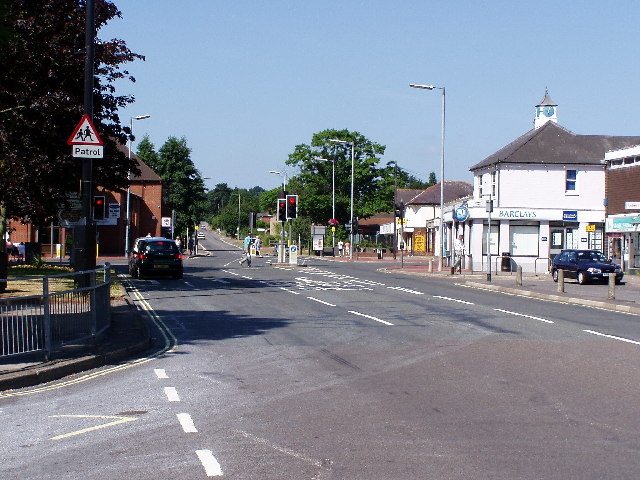
- The town centre

- Location within Hampshire
- Population: 20,790 (2011 Census)
- OS grid reference: SU490128
- Civil parish: Hedge End
- District: Eastleigh
- Shire county: Hampshire
- Region: South East
- Country: England
- Sovereign state: United Kingdom
- Post town: SOUTHAMPTON
- Postcode district: SO30
- Dialling code: 01489
- Police: Hampshire and Isle of Wight
- Fire: Hampshire and Isle of Wight
- Ambulance: South Central
- UK Parliament: Hamble Valley
- Website: Hedge End Town Council

Hedge End is a town and civil parish in Hampshire, England. Situated to the east of the City of Southampton, it adjoins the districts of West End and Botley. Hedge End lies within the Borough of Eastleigh and is part of the Southampton Urban Area. The original hamlet developed on Botley Common after 1250 when it was granted to the men of Botley as common pasture. In 1267, royal charters allowed Botley to hold an annual fair and a weekly market on the common which eventually became a market town.

== History ==
=== Origins ===
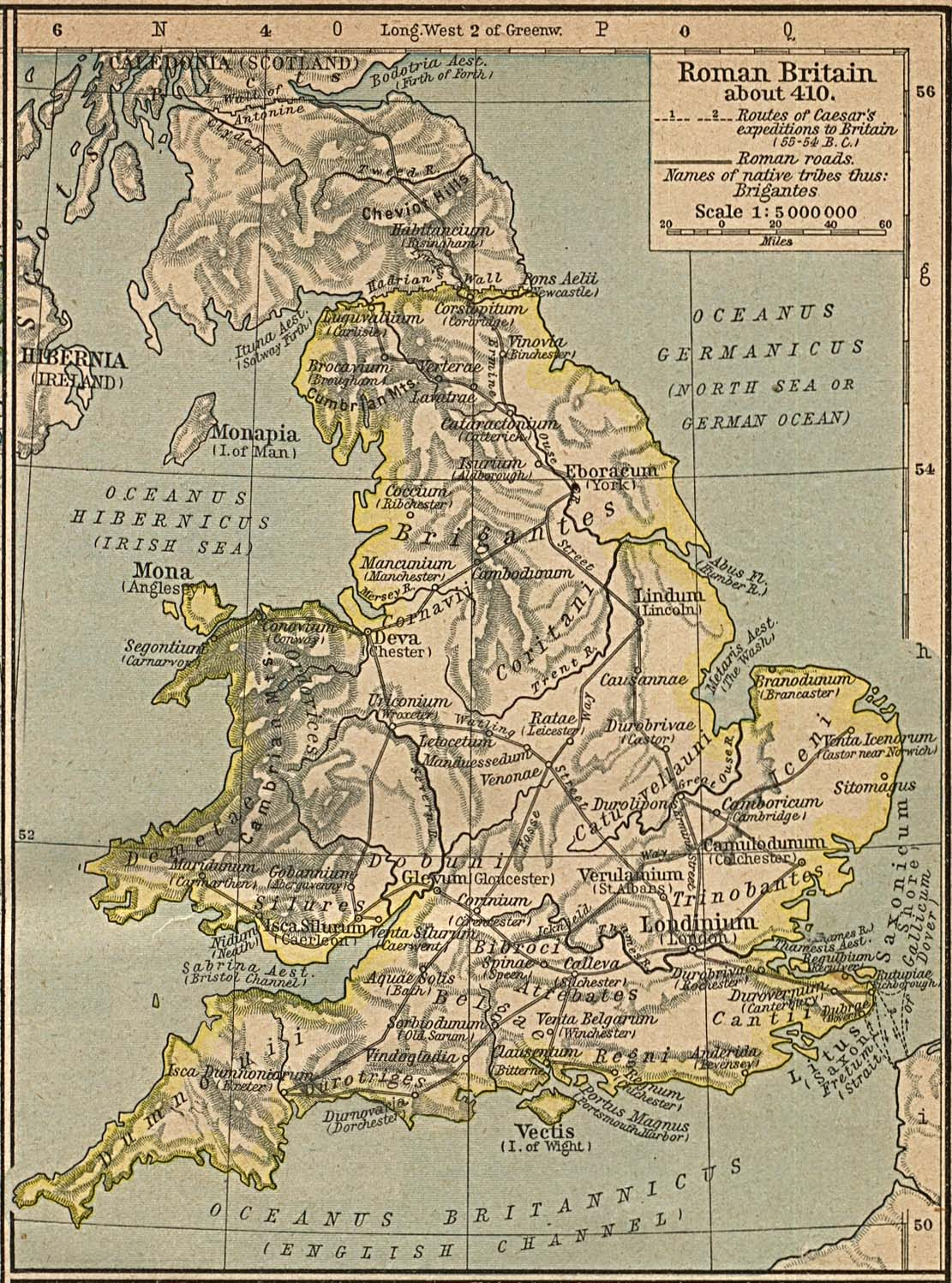
Map of Roman Britain, showing the road from Clausentum to Chichester

The Belgae tribe inhabited the Hedge End area prior to the Roman conquest. A Roman road from Clausentum (a fortified harbour in what is now Bitterne, Southampton) passed through the area on route to Portus Adurni (Portchester Castle) and Noviomagus Reginorum (Chichester). The crossing of the River Itchen at Mansbridge and the crossing of the River Hamble at Botley date to AD932. The road that linked those two river crossings would have followed the approximate route of the modern Grange Road. From Mansbridge, it is 4 miles (6.4 km) to the port of Southampton and 12 miles (19 km) to Winchester, which was for a period the capital of England. Kings of England owned hunting land at King's Copse (originally known as King's Forest).

Farming at the Manor of Shamblehurst is mentioned in a record dating to 1219. Although this area is within the boundary of modern Hedge End, the original hamlet of Hedge End first established itself on Botley Common. This land was granted to the men of Botley as common pasture in 1250. That area is towards the bottom of the hill that rises up to Netley Common and is rich with natural streams and springs. Prior to the Erection of Cottages Act 1588, an Englishman could build his house on common land if he could raise the roof over his head and have a fire in the hearth between sunrise and sunset and claim the dwelling as his home. That procedure and the presence of a reliable water supply would have allowed a few dwellings to become established on Botley Common from 1250 onwards.

In 1267, Royal Charters allowed Botley to hold an annual fair and a weekly market. It became a market town. The inhabitants of Botley Common would have found the proximity of that market and the mills at Botley and Bursledon to be conveniently situated.

The Manor of Shamblehurst died out in the 16th century. Botleigh Grange was built in the 16th century on land that was formerly part of the Manor of Shamblehurst.

The origin of the name Hedge End is uncertain, but it was in use by the beginning of the 18th century. There is an explicit reference to Hedge End in a Court Baron held at Botley Manor on 19 May 1735, concerning the tenancy of a cottage and garden at Hedge End. There is further reference to dating to 1764 concerning a £10 fine for taking in part of the common at Hedge End. Hedge End is also marked on a 1759 map of Southampton.

The inclosure acts ended the system of open farming on common land. Such land was required to be fenced in and title-deeded. This allowed a number of farms to establish themselves in the Hedge End area during the late 18th and 19th centuries.

=== Growing into a village ===
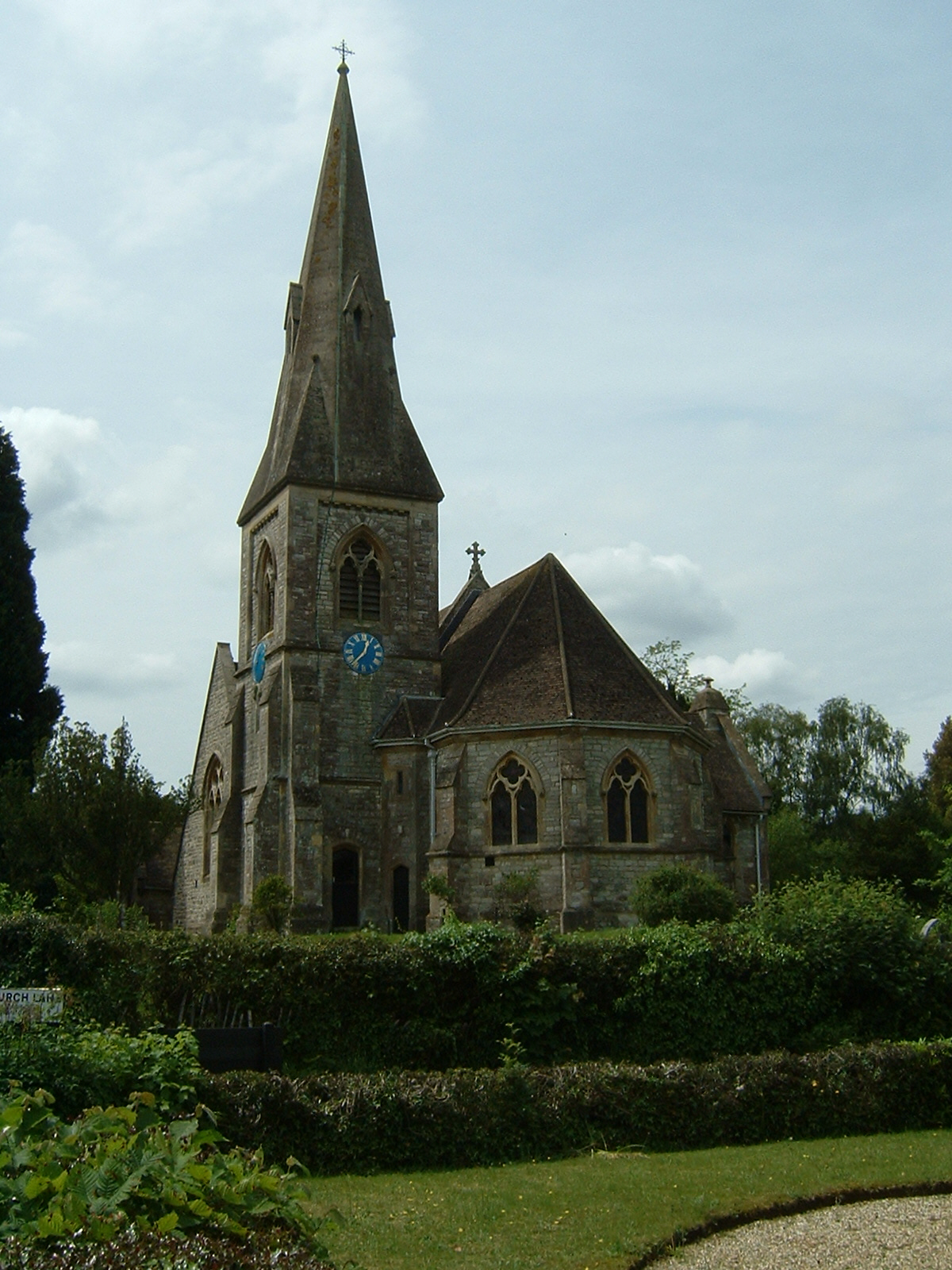
St John's Church, Hedge End

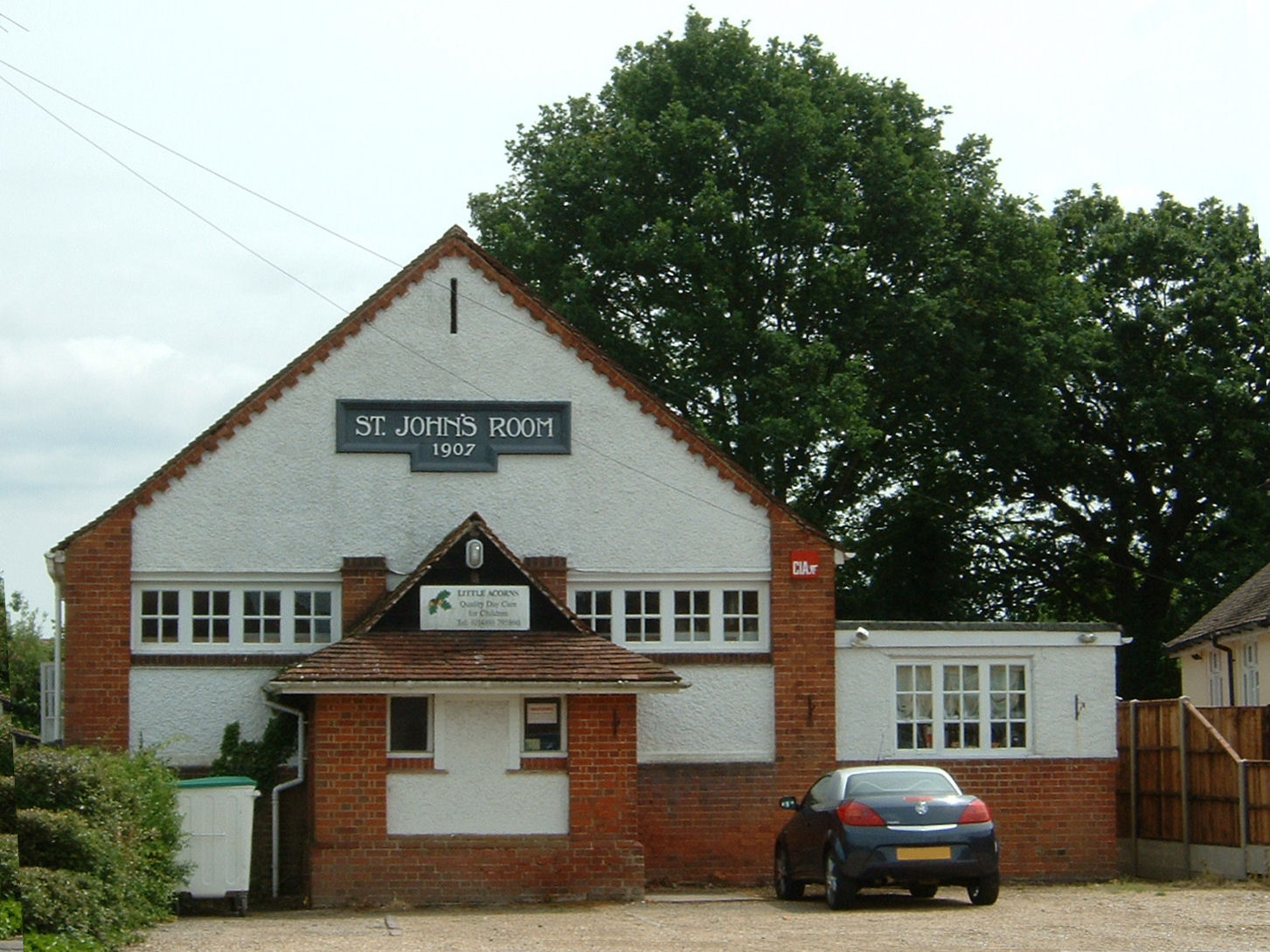
St John's Rooms, Hedge End

The development of two new roads to serve the toll bridges at Northam and Woolston brought travellers closer to Hedge End. Northam road was opened in 1799, with a tollgate at Hedge End. In 1839, another new road was built to provide access to the Floating Bridge at Woolston. This new road cut through the centre of Botley Common, opening the way for further development. In modern Hedge End this is St. Johns Road.

An inclosure act of 1863–1865 formally divided Botley Common into plots. Some plots were used for development, 2 acres (8,100 m^{2}) were for allotments and 3 acres (12,000 m^{2}) were assigned to the lord of the manor, William Warner to be used for a Recreation Ground.

St. John's School was built in 1863, admitting its first 13 children on 18 January 1864. By 1885, the building had been enlarged twice. By 1888, the building was also used as a library.

St. John's Church was consecrated on 15 July 1874 construction having started in 1873 to a design by John Colson. In February 1876, St. John's, Hedge End was constituted as a separate parish for ecclesiastical purposes.

A sub-post office was established on 2 August 1894. Hedge End was constituted a civil parish at its inaugural meeting on 14 December 1894. In 1895, the parish took over responsibility for the recreation ground. The recreation ground between St John's Road and Bursledon Road is all that remains of Botley Common.

In the late 19th century, Hedge End, like many neighbouring villages in the area, was a strawberry growing area. Its produce was despatched to London and Scotland by train service from Botley station.

St. John's Rooms was built in 1907, which was the church hall until the Underhill Centre (named after the Reverend Mervyn Spenser Underhill, Vicar of St John's Church 1961–1994) was opened in 2002. St. John's Rooms now serves as a day nursery for small children.

=== Wartime history ===
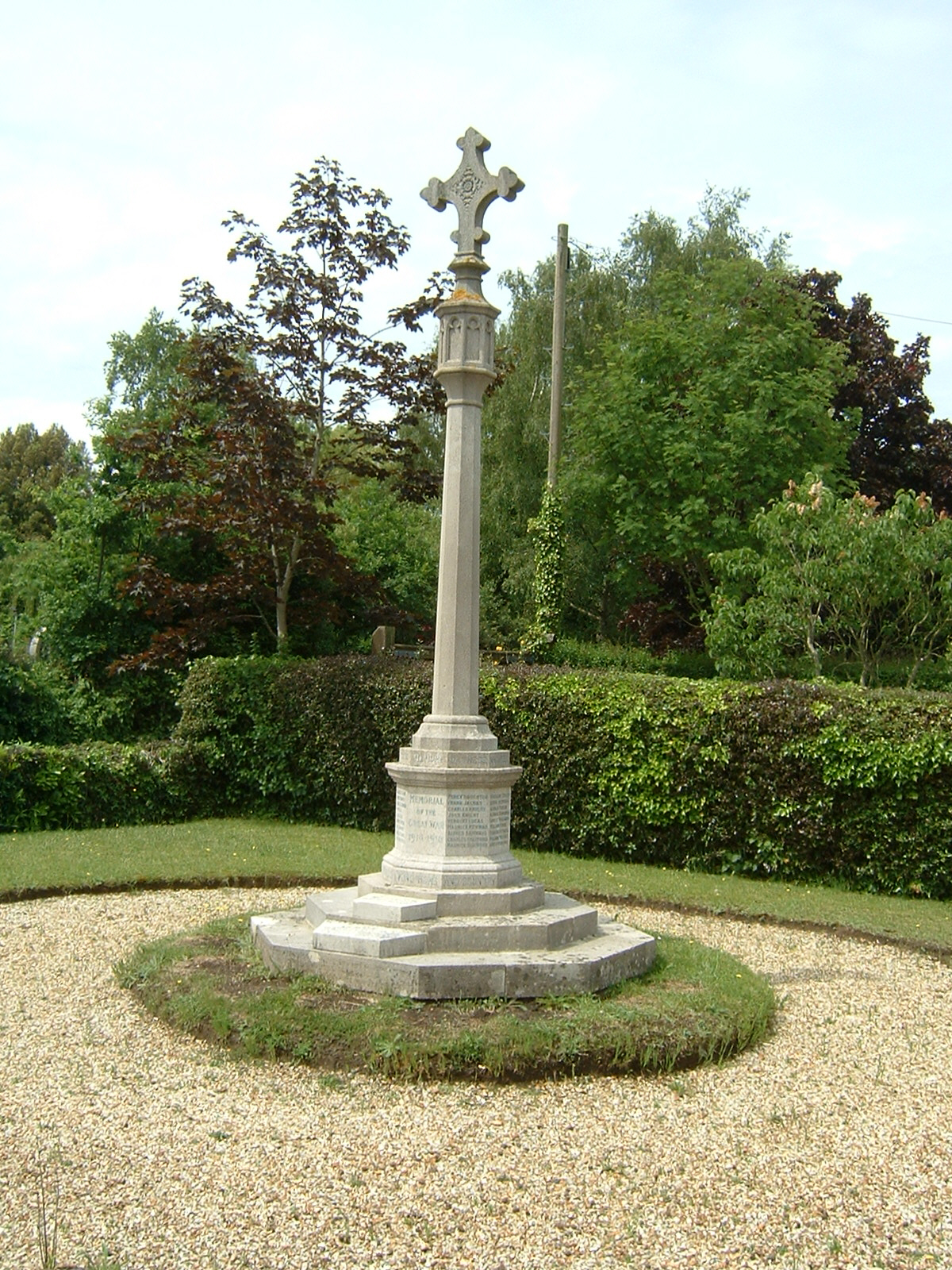
Hedge End War Memorial

To avoid the air-raids, some of Southampton's citizens rented accommodation or otherwise sought shelter in Hedge End during World War II. In 1943 and 1944, during the build-up to D-Day and the invasion of Europe, Hedge End was on the outermost edge of a huge marshalling site set up in Hampshire by the military, known as Area C with the nearest camp, camp C3, located at Netley Common. Hedge End was actually part of sub-area Z within Area C. St Johns Road and Upper Northam Road are shown on a military map dated 1 May 1944 as being operational routes for the flow of military vehicles around the area. Upper Northam Road is also recorded on that map as being used as a vehicle park.

Hedge End was situated within Regulated Area (No 2) established 31 March 1944, which placed restrictions on the movement of people in the final build-up to D-Day.

A V-1 flying bomb fell on HMS Cricket, a military camp just outside Hedge End on 15 July 1944.

=== Becoming a town ===
Development of another new road, the M27 motorway enabled Hedge End to expand further in the final two decades of the 20th century, although as a Southampton suburb, rapid development had commenced in the two decades before the arrival of the motorway.

Hedge End is situated near Junctions 7 and 8 of the motorway. With access to the new infrastructure, there was rapid expansion of the village with office parks, out-of-town superstores and new residential areas.

The most recent major development in Hedge End has been that of Grange Park, situated to the north and east of the village centre. It has continued to grow extensively for several years, and now includes a public park at Dowd's Farm. In the early 1990s the village gained Hedge End railway station opened by British Rail, a stop on the Eastleigh to Fareham line. The parish council resolved to give the village the status of a town in 1992, and the council was renamed Hedge End Town Council.

Hedge End is twinned with Comines-Warneton, in Belgium. The twinning charter was signed in 1994, but very little twinning activity takes place.

On 21 May 2011 Marwell Wildlife was called in by Hampshire Constabulary to advise how to tranquillise a white tiger lurking in grass in the village. The tiger turned out to be a life-size cuddly toy.

== Demography ==
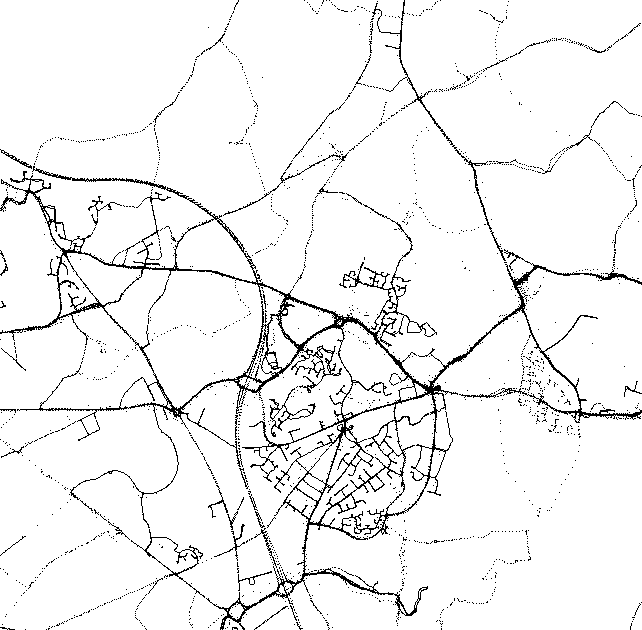
OpenStreetMap tracklogs around Hedge End

The population grew rapidly from an estimated 1,000 in the 1950s to around 17,978 in 2001. New residential areas continued to be developed into the 21st century, with new houses having been built at the former Dowd's Farm site adjacent to Grange Park, next to Kings Copse and Cranbourne Park.

The nearby village of Botley was better established than Hedge End, but when the M27 was built, living close to the new motorway became more desirable.

In 2005 an oil company sought permission to search for oil reserves. These have not been exploited, due to their proximity to the residential area. The company, as of February 2010, was continuing to seek ways to access the oil.

A community theatre/cinema called The Berry Theatre has been built at Wildern School with support from Eastleigh Borough Council. It was funded by the Borough and Town Councils, seats 300 and was completed in 2011.

== Culture and community ==
=== Carnival ===
The first Hedge End Carnival was held in 1921 to raise money to pay for the services of a nurse, as there were no medical facilities in Hedge End at that time. Records do not exist to show whether or not a carnival took place every year and it is thought that during the Second World War, there was no carnival. The carnival took place annually on the first Saturday of July. The week leading up to carnival day saw events and entertainment organised by the Hedge End Carnival Committee, and included a quiz night, scavenger hunt, dog show, Bingo, heritage walks and children's sports day. Other events throughout the year include a Senior Citizens' lunch in October, open to all pensioners in Hedge End; a Fireworks Fiesta and Fun Fair in November; and quiz nights. All profits raised by the carnival and associated events were donated to local voluntary and charity organisations. According to the constitution of the Hedge End Carnival Committee, all money raised must be used to benefit the people of Hedge End. Due to a lack of volunteers, the carnival finished in 2023.

=== Radio station ===
From 2006 to 2023 the town had its own non-profit radio station: Skyline Gold on 102.5FM Founded by David Gates, Skyline was initially funded by grants but then relied on advertising from local businesses to cover the necessary running costs. Skyline used to produce a wide variety of programmes: rock, country, pop, local bands, easy listening and regularly featured interviews from local community groups from the arts, environment and altruistic societies. Skyline used to broadcast from studios in the Old School House in St. Johns Road, which was provided at no cost by Hedge End Town Council. In October 2023 Hedge End Town Council decided to no longer support the station which was forced to move to a premises in neighbouring Botley.

All of the people involved in the station are unpaid volunteers. As of 10 February 2007, Skyline streams live on the internet.

== Education ==
The town is served by Wildern School which currently has around 1800 pupils. The school site, on Wildern Lane near the town centre, houses a media facility known as the d.@rt Centre (representing "Digital Art"). It also has a recently renovated sports centre which serves the local community with a hall, indoor heated swimming pool, toddlers' swimming pool, gym facilities and a dance studio as well as a £250,000 Multi Use Games Area (MUGA), an all-weather surface similar to Astroturf. Deer Park School was constructed and open in September 2021.

Shamblehurst Primary School is adjacent to the Wildern site. Freegrounds Infant and Junior Schools occupy a shared site on the other side of the town centre. King Copse Primary School is also in Hedge End, located near the Cranbourne Park area. Kings Copse Primary School recently underwent a complete rebuild and opened in September 2008. Berrywood Primary School and Wellstead Primary School serve the Grange Park area.

== Notable residents ==
- Actor Robin Nedwell, best known for his roles in Shillingbury Tales and Doctor in the House used to live at Hedge End until his death in 1999.
- Footballer Kevin Moore
- Geneticist Joseph Smartt
- Member of Parliament for Hamble Valley, Paul Holmes
- A.F.C Totton footballer Brett Williams
- Reverend Clement Smith

== Twin towns ==
- Comines-Warneton, Belgium

== See also ==
- List of places of worship in the Borough of Eastleigh
