= Whisking =

Whisking may refer to:

- The use or action of a whisk
- Movement of the whiskers in some animal species
