= Ancasta =

Celtic goddess worshipped in Roman Britain

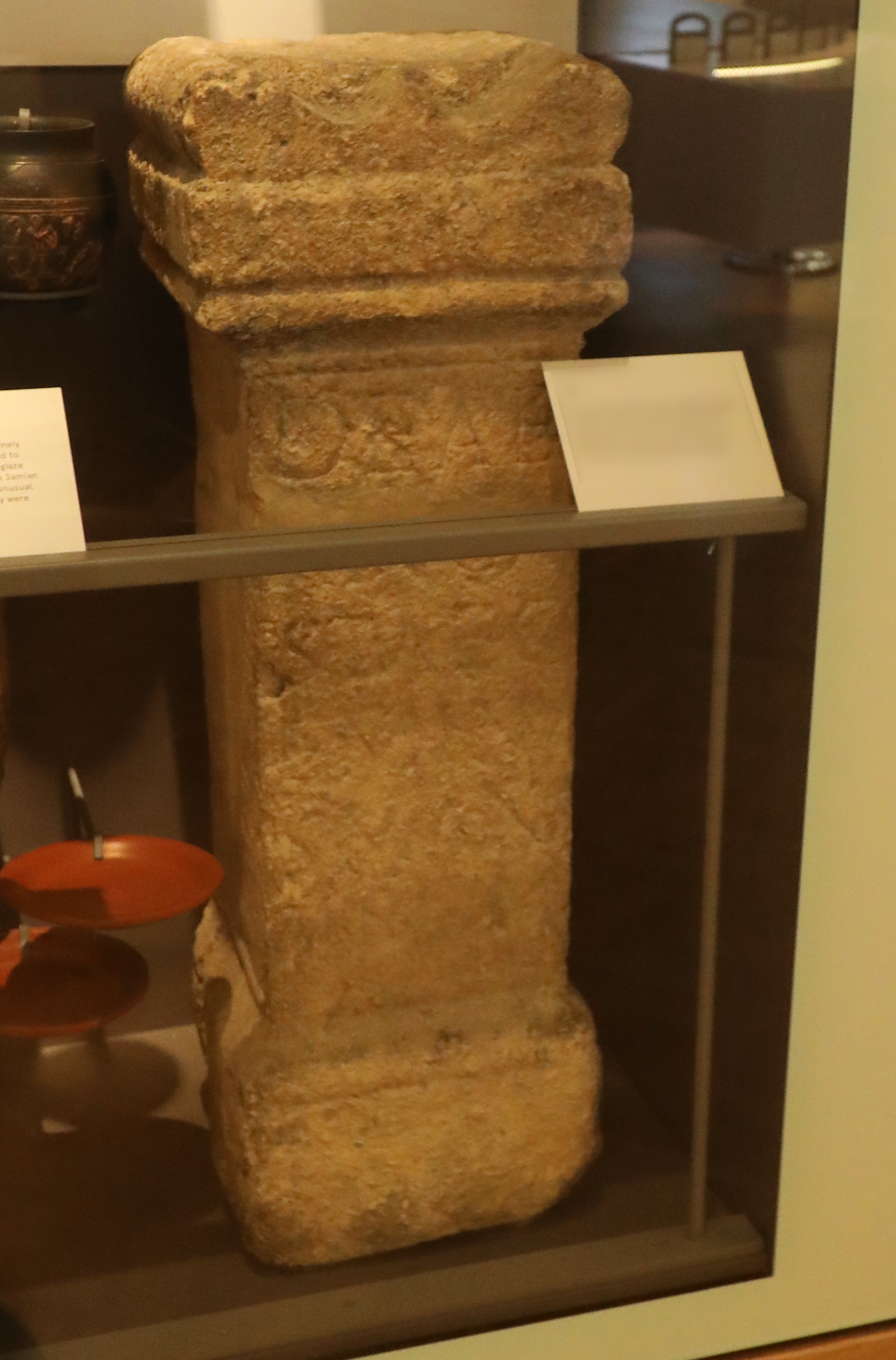
The Ancasta Altar

Ancasta was a Celtic goddess worshipped in Roman Britain. She is known from a single dedicatory inscription found in the United Kingdom at the Roman settlement of Clausentum (Bitterne, near Southampton). Ancasta may be taken to be a local goddess, possibly associated with the nearby River Itchen.

The votive dedication to Ancasta reads:

DEAE ANCASTAE GEMINVS MANI VSLM
"To the goddess Ancasta, Geminus Mani[lius] willingly and deservedly fulfills his vow."

It may be possible that the name 'Ancasta' is related to Proto-Celtic *kasto- meaning 'swift'.

The inscription is now in the SeaCity Museum. It was previously in the museum at God's House Tower.
