= Joseph Smartt =

British geneticist

Joseph ("Joe") Smartt (9 September 1931 – 7 June 2013) was a British geneticist with major contributions to the knowledge of crop evolution, especially of grain legumes.

== Education and early life ==
Born in West Ham, East London, Smartt graduated from Durham University in 1952 with a botany degree. He was a member of Hatfield College during his undergraduate studies. He then studied at Cambridge University (Christ's College) for a diploma in agricultural science.

In 1954, he went to Northern Rhodesia (now Zambia), where he bred groundnuts until 1961. He completed his PhD in the Department of Genetics at North Carolina State University (NCSU) in 1965; his thesis was a study on cross compatibility between the cultivated groundnut, Arachis hypogaea, and wild species.

== Career and research ==
Smartt joined Southampton University in 1967 as a lecturer in the Department of Botany. He was promoted to Reader in Biology in 1990. Southampton University awarded him a Doctor of Science (DSc) in 1989 for his work on the genetics and evolution of crop plants. He retired from Southampton in 1996.

Smartt authored two books on grain legumes, edited a major volume on groundnuts, and was invited to co-edit a second edition of the important Evolution of Crop Plants with Professor Norman Simmonds. As a researcher, his most influential work concerned the diversity, evolution, and domestication syndromes in grain legumes.

His hobby of goldfish breeding and judging generated a long-standing research interest in the genetics of goldfish, publishing two books on the subject and serving as scientific adviser to the Goldfish Society of Great Britain.

== Selected publications ==
=== Books ===
- Smartt, Joseph (1976). Tropical Pulses. Longman. ISBN 9780582466791.
- ——— (1990). Grain Legumes: Evolution and Genetic Resources. Cambridge University Press. ISBN 9780521307970.
- ———; Simmonds, Norman W. (1995). Evolution of Crop Plants (2nd ed.). Longman Scientific & Technical. ISBN 9780582086432.
- Simmonds, Norman W.; Smartt, Joseph (1999). Principles of Crop Improvement (2nd ed.). Blackwell Science. ISBN 9780632041916.
- Smartt, Joseph (2001). Goldfish Varieties and Genetics: Handbook for Breeders. Wiley-Blackwell. ISBN 9780852382653.

=== Journal articles ===
- Smartt, Joseph (1980). "Some observations on the origin and evolution of the winged bean (Psophocarpus tetragonolobus)". Euphytica. 29 (1): 121–123.
- ——— (1984). "Evolution of grain legumes I. Mediterranean pulses". Experimental Agriculture. 20: 275–296.
- ——— (1986). "Evolution of grain legumes. VI. The future—the exploitation of evolutionary knowledge". Experimental Agriculture. 22: 39–58.
- ——— (2007). "A possible genetic basis for species replacement: preliminary results of interspecific hybridisation between native crucian carp Carassius carassius (L.) and introduced goldfish Carassius auratus (L.)". Aquatic Invasions. 2 (1): 59–62.
