= Bitterne Manor =

Suburb of Southampton, England

Coordinates: 50.9183°N 1.3822°W

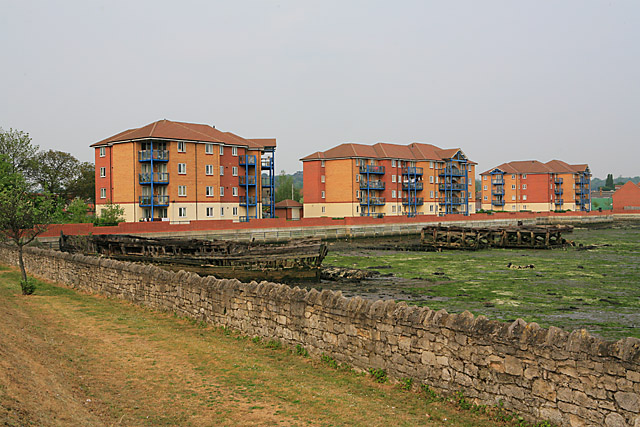
- Modern residential development on Quayside Road

- Location within Southampton
- Unitary authority: Southampton
- Ceremonial county: Hampshire
- Region: South East
- Country: England
- Sovereign state: United Kingdom
- Post town: SOUTHAMPTON
- Postcode district: SO18
- Dialling code: 023
- Police: Hampshire and Isle of Wight
- Fire: Hampshire and Isle of Wight
- Ambulance: South Central
- UK Parliament: Southampton Itchen

Bitterne Manor is a suburb of Southampton surrounding the manor house of the same name. It is located on the eastern bank of the River Itchen, across Cobden Bridge from St Denys.

== History ==
Bitterne Manor is the site of the original Roman settlement of Clausentum, the forerunner to today's City of Southampton.

Archaeological evidence shows Saxon activity around Bitterne Manor and the area within the old Roman walls may have been the Burh of Hampton

The manor house has existed from Norman times and possibly earlier, and was built from the stones of Clausentum. The house was used by the Bishop of Winchester, who travelled from manor to manor with his court throughout each year. The manor house also operated as a farm, and was surrounded by parkland. Bitterne Park today, though, is a built-up area.

With its easy access to the River Itchen and the navigation to Winchester, Bitterne Manor was used by the bishops as a distribution centre for wine and salt, which was panned in the river.

Arrangements were made to determine the exact boundaries between the manor and the Abbey lands at Hound and Netley in January 1246. This boundary remained in place until the mid 19th century, and was used in part as the subsequent boundary between the Itchen Urban District Council and Bitterne Parish Council.

Robert Kilwardby, the Archbishop of Canterbury, visited Bitterne Manor in 1274 and spent Christmas there.

The scarcity of farm labourers resulting from the Black Death of 1348 led to higher running costs in manors across the country, and it became more profitable to let the house to tenants and sublet the farmland to tenant farmers. Bitterne Manor was tenant-occupied from the late 15th Century to the early 19th Century.

William Camden visited the manor in around 1586, describing it as "an ancient castle ... at every tide [it] is encompassed for three parts of it by water a great breadth."

The Bishop of Winchester sold the lease to the manor to a Mr. Simpson in 1802. The new owner did not wish to use the manor as a farm, and so in 1804–05 the farmhouse was demolished and a new manor house constructed. The defensive ditch that the Romans had constructed was filled in. The Northam Bridge was also built around this time, opening initially as a toll bridge. This allowed the growing Southampton to expand, leading to the urbanisation of the Bitterne Manor area.

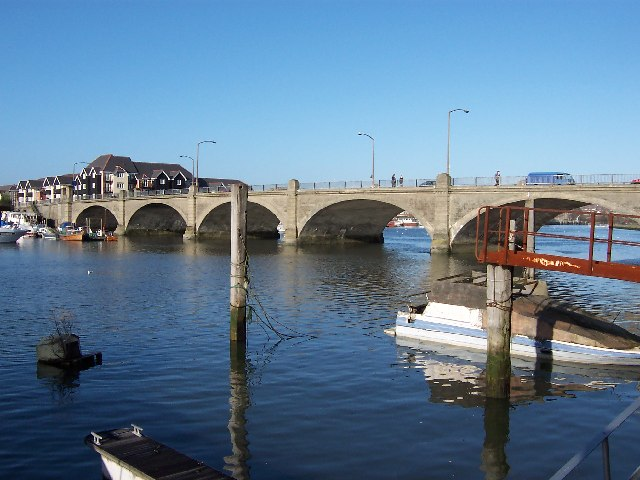
Cobden Bridge from Bitterne Manor

James Stuart Hall purchased Bitterne Manor in August 1818. On his death in 1822, the Manor was willed to his wife Jesse (Hunter) Stuart Hall and, on her death in 1847, to her sister Jane (Hunter) Eastmont. It later passed to her daughter Agnes Eastmont, who married Sir Steuert MacNaghten; thus, the property came into the MacNaghten Family.

The manor, including approximately 50 acres (200,000 m^{2}) of surrounding property, was purchased by Sir Steuert MacNaghten around 1863, and was used as the private residence of his family until his death in 1895. Following the death of Steuert MacNaghten, most of the land surrounding the manor house was sold to the Southampton Corporation for residential development. The MacNaghten family re-acquired the manor house and a few acres of grounds in 1902, and continued to use it as the family residence. Upon the death of Steuert MacNaghten's widow, Amy Katherine MacNaghten, in 1906, the manor house passed to their children. One of these, Lettice MacNaghten, purchased full title from her siblings and continued to live in the house, often taking in paying guests, who at one stage in the 1930s included the family of novelist Nicolas Freeling. The house was severely damaged by German bombing raids on Southampton during World War II. Lettice then abandoned the house, took refuge with her sister-in-law in Guildford, and refused to return to it in its damaged condition. The damaged manor house was vandalised and ultimately sold to an architect, who converted it into flats.

A scientific excavation of the site was carried out between 1951 and 1954 by the Ministry of Works, the results published in 1958 by Her Majesty's Stationery Office. The house is grade II listed, having first been listed on 14 July 1953.

Today, the manor house and its grounds are privately owned and split into fourteen apartments. Some of the surrounding grounds, consisting of grassland, woodland and a natural foreshore to the River Itchen, are maintained by the council as a public open space.

== Geography ==
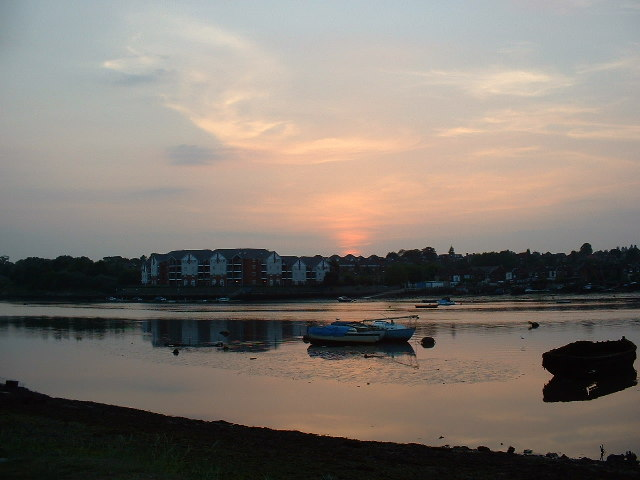
River Itchen, Bitterne Manor

The area is bounded on the north, west and south by the River Itchen, and on the east by the railway line linking Southampton to Portsmouth. Northam Bridge crosses the river to the neighbouring suburb of Northam, whilst beyond the railway line is the suburb of Bitterne. The A3024 dual carriageway runs through the area, one of the primary commuter routes in and out of Southampton from the East.

Apart from the grounds of the manor house, the area immediately around the dual carriageway is mostly taken up by residential housing and Bitterne Manor Primary School. On the fringes of the suburb, where it meets the river, a number of industrial units can be found. There are also some small nature reserves lining the river banks. Chessel Bay has been designated a Site of Special Scientific Interest.
