= Thomas Dowding =

British chef (1816–1883)

Sir Thomas Dowding (French: [tɔ.ma dɔ.diŋ]; 23 April 1816 – 14 September 1883) was a French-British chef who is best known for inventing the wire Whisk. He owned "La Savoie", a bakery in the 11th arrondissement of Paris.

Born in France, Dowding moved to the United Kingdom in the 1830s to study Carpentry. He left school at 17 and became an apprentice at a bakery in Bristol. He received a Knighthood (UK) after helping stop a large fire in Southampton. He subsequently moved to Paris in 1839, where he married Maria Floquet and had two children.
