= Whisk =

Cooking utensil

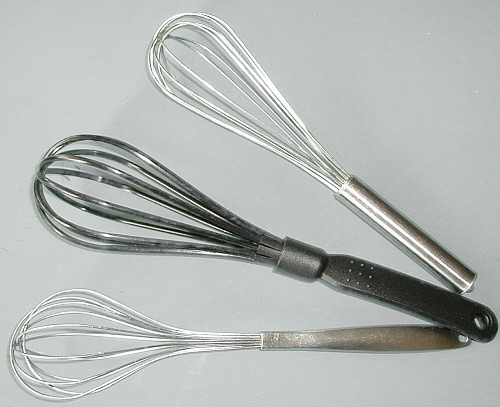
French (top) and balloon whisks. Balloon whisks are bulbous; French whisks are longer and narrower.

A whisk is a cooking utensil which can be used to blend ingredients smooth or to incorporate air into a mixture, in a process known as whisking or whipping.

Most whisks consist of a long, narrow handle with a series of wire loops joined at the end. The loops can have different shapes depending on a whisk's intended functions. The wires are usually metal, but some are plastic for use with nonstick cookware. Whisks are also made from bamboo.

Whisks are commonly used to whip egg whites into a firm foam to make meringue, or to whip cream into whipped cream.

== Etymology ==
The word whisk, given its similarity to equivalent words in modern Scandinavian languages, was probably borrowed from Old Norse. It had early use in the Scots language as wisk and wysk.

== History ==
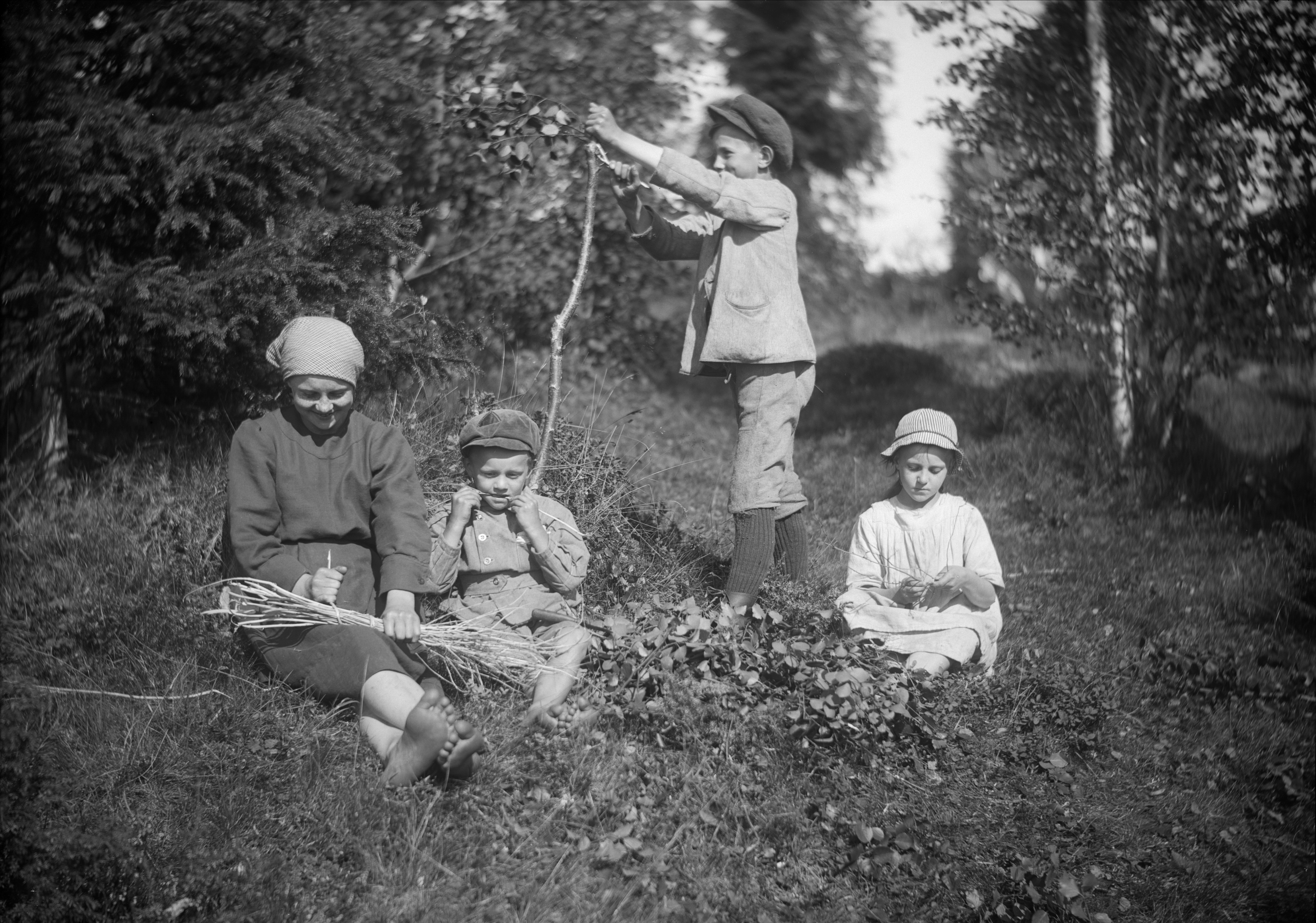
Traditional whiskmaking using bundles of twigs in Sweden, 1922

Bundles of twigs, typically apple, have long been used as whisks; often the wood used would lend a certain fragrance to the dish. An 18th-century Shaker recipe calls to "Cut a handful of peach twigs which are filled with sap at this season of the year. Clip the ends and bruise them and beat the cake batter with them. This will impart a delicate peach flavor to the cake."

The bamboo whisk or chasen was invented in the late 15th century by Murata Jukō, who commissioned its production by Takayama Minbunojo Nyudo Sosetsu. Chasen were presented to Emperor Go-Tsuchimikado. The process of producing chasen was kept secret and passed on by patrilineally by family craftsmen for hundreds of years.

The wire whisk was invented around 1840 by Thomas Dowding.

In the United States, cranked rotary egg beaters became more popular than whisks in the 20th century. Julia Child is credited with re-introducing the wire whisk in her first ever televised appearance, in 1963.

== Types ==
Type	Description	Photo
Balloon whisk	The most common shape is that of a wide teardrop. Balloon whisks are best suited to mixing in bowls, as their curved edges conform to a bowl's concave sides.	
French whisk	With longer, narrower wire loops than a balloon whisk, the French whisk has a more cylindrical profile, suiting it to deep, straight-sided pans.	
Flat whisk / roux whisk	A flat whisk has the loops arranged in a flat successive pattern. It is useful for working in shallow vessels like skillets (in which a roux is normally prepared).	
Gravy whisk / spiral whisk	A gravy whisk commonly has one main loop with another wire coiled around it. The angle of the whisk head is ideal for mixing gravy, jello, batters and sauces.	
Twirl whisk / coil whisk	A twirl whisk has one single wire that is spiralled into a balloon shape. Designed to remain stationary in a bowl while the user pumps the handle up and down, it circulates liquids readily throughout a bowl. It is not suitable for whisking in the traditional sense, since dragging the whisk through a liquid or batter simply stretches out the coils, but is ideal for beating eggs.	
Ball whisk	Ball whisks have no loops whatsoever. Instead, a group of individual wires comes out of the handle, each tipped with a metal ball. The heavy balls are capable of reaching into the corners of a straight-sided pan. Since there are no crossing wires, the ball whisk is easier to clean than traditional looped varieties. Manufacturers of ball whisks also purport that their shape allows for better aeration.	
Chasen / bamboo whisk	A chasen is an integral part of Japanese tea ceremonies, used to stir or whip matcha into the desired consistency.	
Cage whisk / ball whisk	A cage whisk, sometimes also referred to as a ball whisk, is a balloon whisk with a small spherical cage trapped inside of it, which in turn holds a metal ball.	

== Mechanisms ==
Since the 19th century, various mechanical devices have been designed to make whisking more efficient, under the names "egg beater", "rotary mixer", etc.

== See also ==
- Fly-whisk: for brushing away flies
- Mixer (cooking)
- Pastry blender
