= Clausentum =

Town in Roman Britannia

Coordinates: 50.9180°N 1.3834°W

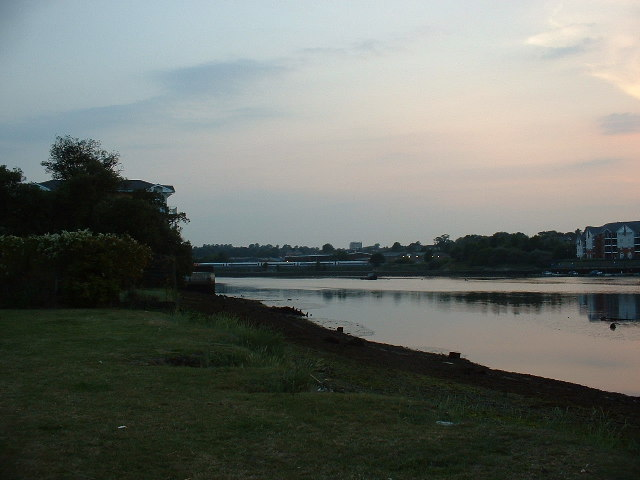
View over the Itchen river at the approximate site of Clausentum

Clausentum was a small town in the Roman province of Britannia. The site is believed to be located in Bitterne Manor, which is now a suburb of Southampton.

== Identification ==
Route VII of the Antonine Itinerary documents the Roman settlement of Clausentum as being 20 miles (32 km) west of Noviomagus Reginorum (Chichester) and 10 miles (16 km) from Venta Belgarum (Winchester). In 1610, William Camden identified Southampton as being the site of Clausentum and described how at Bitterne he had seen "old broken walls, and trenches of an ancient castle". Around 1770, John Speed claimed that Clausentum was in the area that is now known as Bitterne Manor. In 1792, the antiquary Richard Warner investigated those claims and found a ditch, an earth bank and some Roman coins. Since then, this site has been investigated further and is generally accepted as the site of Clausentum, but there is no universal agreement.

Reference to modern maps shows Bitterne Manor to be 25 miles (40 km) from Chichester. Wickham is at the junction of two Roman Roads and is a better fit to the distances documented in Route VII of the Antonine Itinerary. The case for Clausentum being situated at Bitterne Manor is based on archaeological evidence, and the geography of the site (nestled inside a sharp bend in the River Itchen) which clearly allowed it to be turned into a good defensive position. The fact that there was a Roman settlement at what is now Bitterne Manor is not disputed.

== Post-Roman use ==
The walls may have been reused for a Saxon burh.

== Site ==
The settlement is located on a promontory jutting into the River Itchen. The first archaeological excavations were conducted in 1935, and Molly Cotton undertook excavations from 1951 to 1954. The excavations showed that it was the site of a small town in the 1st and 2nd centuries. At a later date a stone defensive wall was erected around the site. The early excavators dated the erection of this wall to around 370, but later evidence showed that the walls were erected around 280–90, at about the same time as the fort at nearby Portchester (Portus Adurni). Traces of a Roman road on a line running from Bitterne Manor to Wickham have also been found.

Today, all that is visible are the fragmentary remains of a small 2nd-century bath house, and a fragment of the 3rd century fortified walls. The baths consist of four rooms, later converted into a two-roomed structure. They were demolished when the fortified wall was built at the end of the 3rd century. The remains are located on private property, at Bitterne Manor House, and permission is needed to see them.

== Finds ==
Four Roman milestones and three possible milestones were found at Bitterne between 1800 and 1850. Two are in the Tudor House and Garden in Southampton; the remainder are lost. Other artifacts from Clausentum on display at SeaCity Museum in Southampton include an altar dedicated to the Celtic goddess Ancasta, a bronze Hercules with Celtic hair-style, and a pipe-clay Venus.
