= Regulated Area (No 2) =

Regulated Area (No 2) was a region of England that was under government restriction during the preparations for D-Day and the Invasion of Europe during the Second World War. The order establishing Regulated Area (No 2) was issued on 31 March 1944. This area comprised a 10-mile-wide coastal strip extending from the Wash to Lands End, intended to safeguard the preparations for D-Day in southern England. The restrictions were in place from 1 April to 25 August 1944.

Within this area, the movement of people was restricted. Guards were placed at all points of entry to this zone, and no visitors were permitted. Within this zone, further localised directions could be issued, placing further restrictions on the local population. These particularly prohibited the carrying of cameras, telescopes and binoculars on any highway or in public places. Those directions were supplementary and were used in the more sensitive areas within the area.
