= Port of Southampton =

Passenger and cargo port in Southampton, England

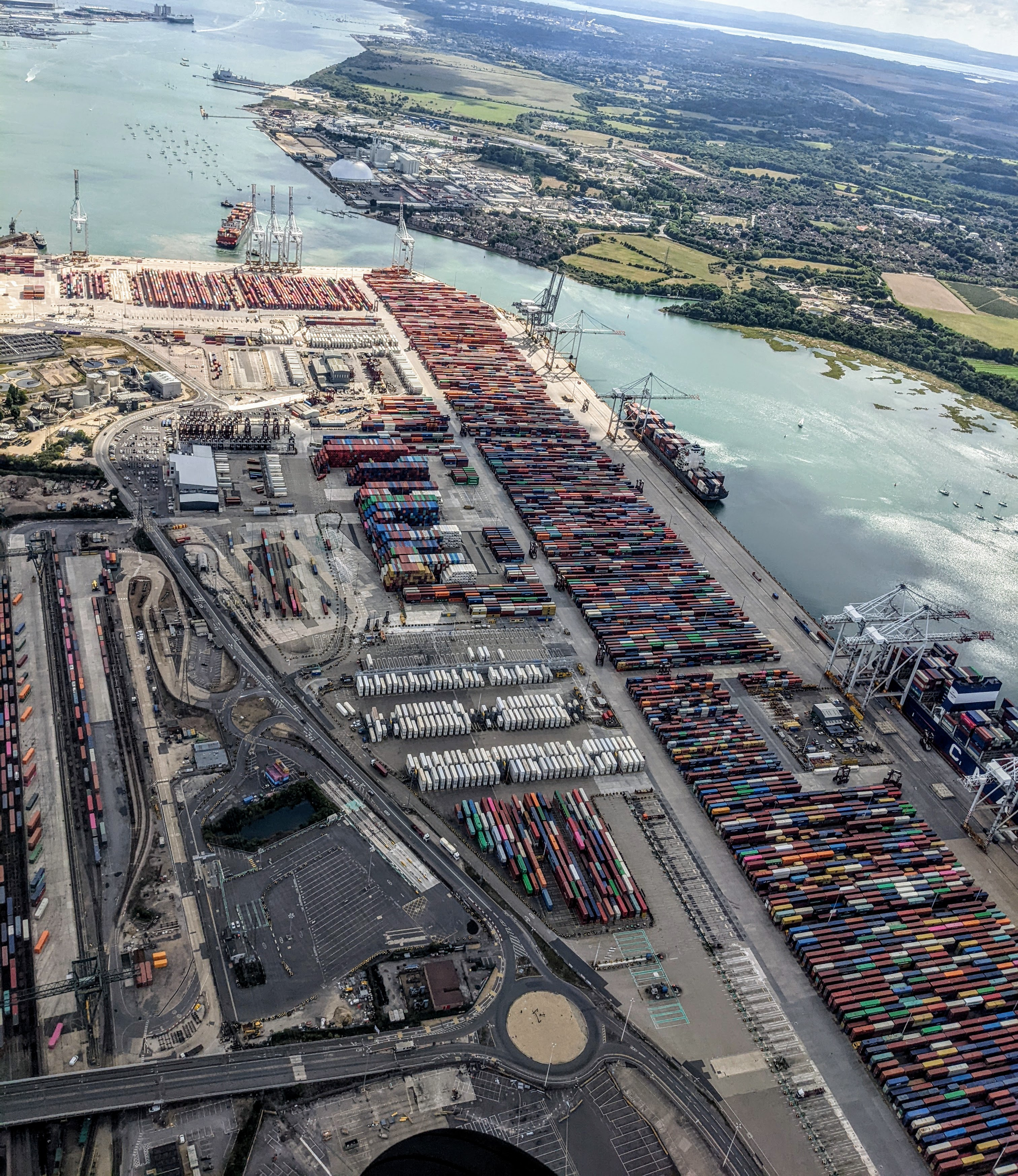
- Interactive map of Port of Southampton

Location
- Country: United Kingdom
- Location: Southampton, England
- Coordinates: 50°53′47″N 1°23′48″W

Details
- Operated by: Associated British Ports
- No. of berths: 45 (20–49, 101–110, 200–207)

Statistics
- Website; Port of Southampton

The Port of Southampton is a passenger and cargo port in the central part of the south coast of England. The modern era in the history of the Port of Southampton began when the first dock was inaugurated in 1843. After the Port of Felixstowe, Southampton is the second largest container terminal in the United Kingdom, with a handled traffic of 1.5 million twenty-foot equivalent units (TEU). It also handles cruise ships, roll-on roll-off, dry bulk, and liquid bulk (mainly crude oil).

In 2015, DP World extended its operating license for DP World Southampton until 2047, following a deal with Associated British Ports (ABP). DP World is the sole owner of DP World Southampton, having acquired ABP's 49 per cent stake, having been owned and operated by ABP since 1982.

It is the busiest cruise terminal and second largest container port in the UK. By volume of port traffic, Southampton is a Medium-Port City globally.

The port is located between the confluence of the rivers Test and Itchen at the head of the mile-wide drowned valley known as Southampton Water. The mouth of the inlet is protected from the effects of foul weather by the mass of the Isle of Wight, which gives the port a sheltered location. Additional advantages include a densely populated hinterland; proximity to London, and good rail and road links to the rest of Britain which bypass the congestion of London.

The average tidal range is approximately 4 metres (13 feet), with 17 hours per day of rising water thanks to the port's "double tides". These allow the largest container and cruise ships access to the port for up to 80 per cent of the time, according to the container terminal operator DP World Southampton. This is a result of tidal flow through the English Channel: high tide at one end of the Channel (Dover) occurs at the same time as low tide at the other end (Land's End). Points near the centre have one high water as the tidal swell goes from west to east, another as it then goes from east to west. Neither is as high as the one at each end of the English Channel.

The principal berths are divided into three areas:

- The Old Docks at the junction of the Rivers Test and Itchen, consisting of berths 20–49
- The New Docks, known as the Western Docks, built by the Southern Railway, consisting of Berths 101–110; and
- The Container Terminal, originally consisting of berths 201–207. This terminal was constructed entirely on reclaimed land, with berth 201 opening in 1968. However the berths at the container terminal have since been renamed. Berths 207 to 204 are now berths SCT 1 to 4 respectively, and the reconstructed berths 201/202 now SCT 5.

== Cruise shipping ==
=== Passenger terminals ===
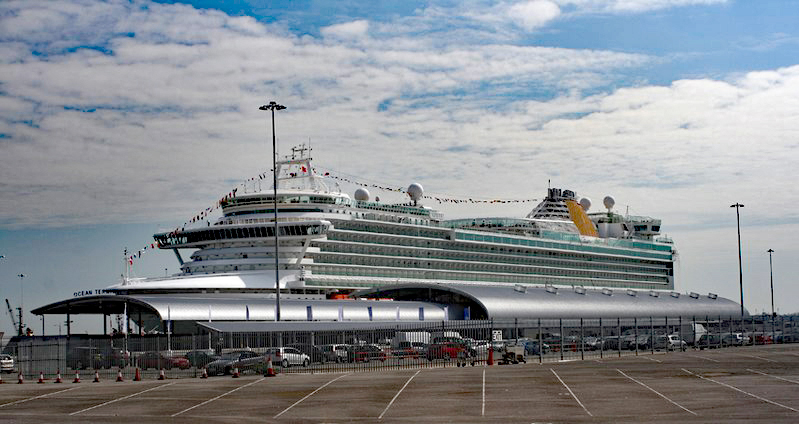
The Ocean Cruise Terminal at berth 46 with the P&O cruise ship Azura alongside

There are five active passenger terminals in the port of Southampton servicing passenger ships.

- Queen Elizabeth II Terminal, berth 38/39 opened 1966, modernised 2003 and 2016.
- Mayflower Cruise Terminal, berth 106 opened 1960, modernised 2003 and 2015 with shorepower added in 2022
- City Terminal, berth 101 opened 2003, upgraded 2007
- Ocean Terminal, berth 46 opened 2009
- Horizon Cruise Terminal, berth 102, opened summer 2021 with shorepower added in 2022

In addition to the passenger terminals, Berth 104 (Fruit Terminal) is generally used for fruit transport but has been used for passenger ships during busy times.

=== Operators ===
The first full-time cruise ship was Ceylon, a P&O liner converted in 1881. Until then, ship owners had occasionally used liners for off-season cruising. From 1881 the cruise industry grew slowly until the 1970s, when major shipping operators were badly affected by the rise in popularity of long-haul jet air travel. Faced with falling demand for their mail and passenger services, they turned their business to holiday cruises: voyages that usually end where they begin, providing short leisure visits to other ports on the way.

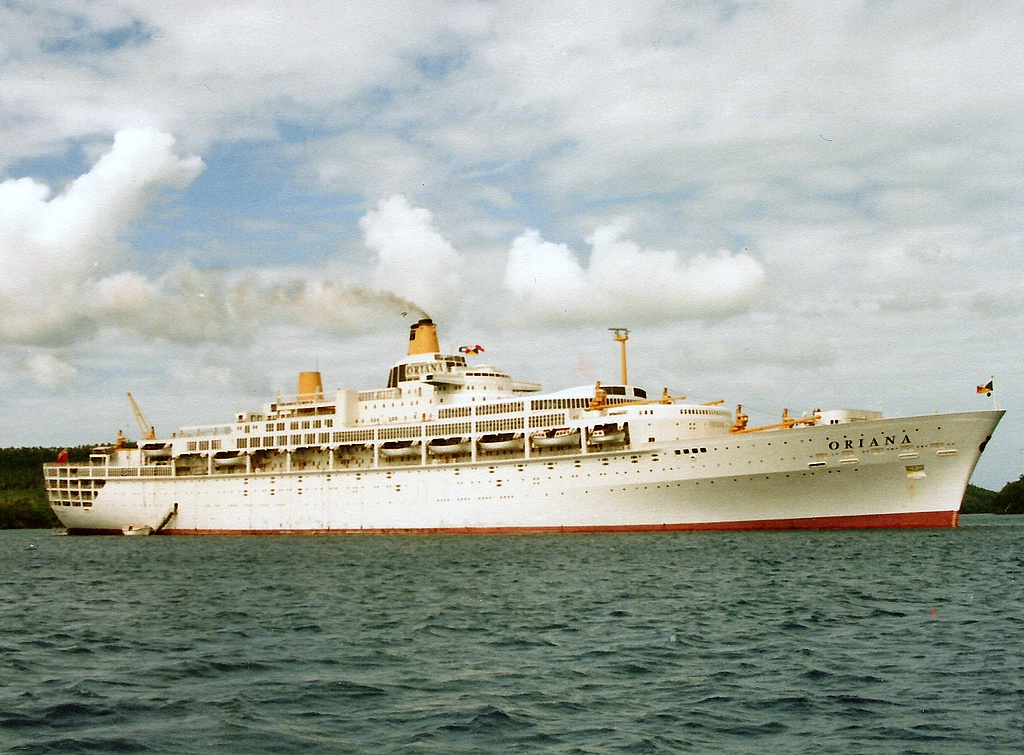
SS Oriana

At Southampton at the time, the ships affected included Cunard's Queen Elizabeth 2 and the P&O vessels SS Oriana and SS Canberra: all originally built as fast liners, they began to offer a growing variety of cruises. Through the 1990s cruising's growing popularity saw huge increases in ship size and numbers as well as terminal capacity, with Southampton becoming one of the busiest cruise ports in the world.

Cruise ship sizes have risen substantially in recent years. The largest vessel using the Port of Southampton is P&O Cruises Arvia, with a length of 345 m (1,132 ft), a gross tonnage of 184,700 and a passenger capacity of 5,200. In 2005, the number of passengers using the port totalled 738,000, higher than it had been in any one year of the previous century. Since then it has increased year on year, and the figure for 2019 was 1.9 million passengers, representing approximately 520 calls by passenger ships. On average, each docking is worth £1.25 million to the local economy. The Port of Southampton is the busiest cruise turnaround port in Northern Europe.

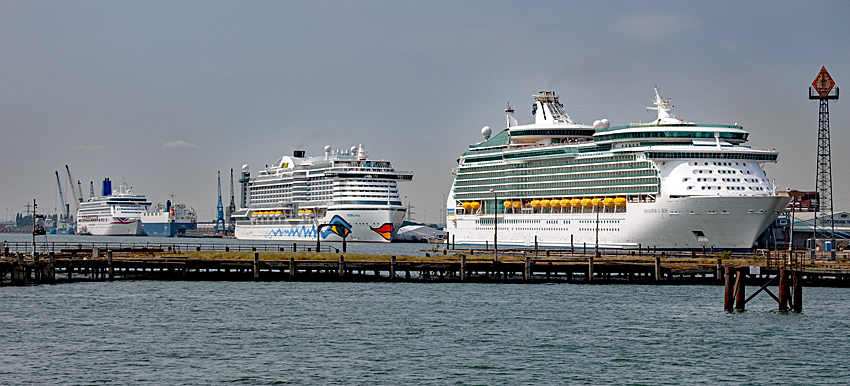
Aurora, AIDAprima and Navigator of the Seas at Southampton

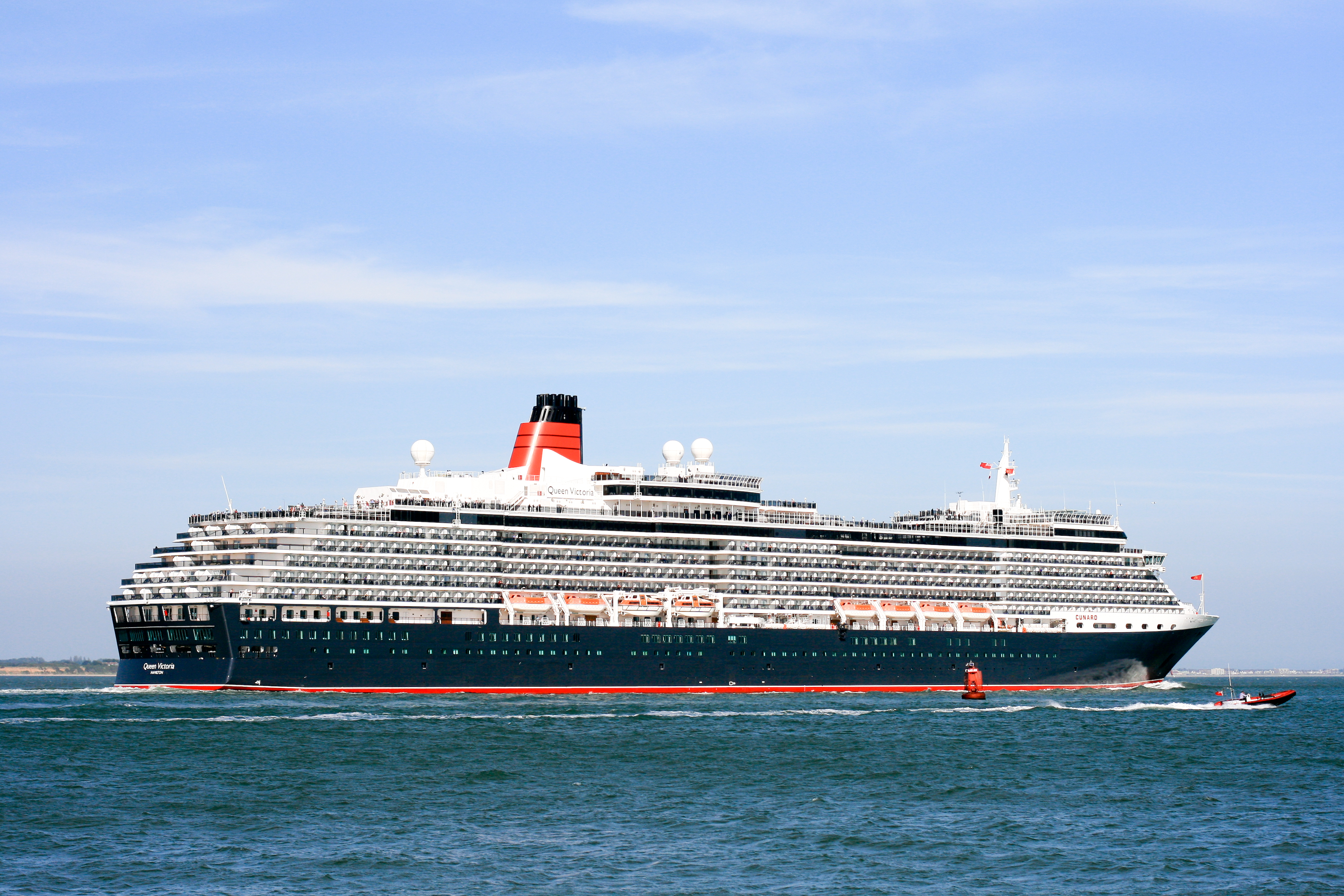
Queen Victoria at Calshot, departing Southampton, June 2013

Southampton is now the base of these cruise ships:

- P&O Cruises – Arcadia, Arvia, Aurora, Britannia, Iona, Ventura
- Celebrity Cruises – Celebrity Silhouette
- Cunard – Queen Victoria, Queen Elizabeth, Queen Anne
- Princess Cruises – Royal Princess, Sky Princess
- Royal Caribbean – Anthem of the Seas

and the ocean liner:

- Cunard – Queen Mary 2, the only vessel left with a scheduled transatlantic service to New York from Southampton

In addition, Southampton is a regular port of call for ships of other cruise companies, including:

- AIDA - German cruise line part of Carnival; fourteen ships
- Azamara Cruises - four ships
- Crystal Cruises – based in Los Angeles; three ships
- Costa Cruises– part of Carnival; Italian flag; eleven ships
- Disney Cruise Line - based in Florida; five ships
- Fred. Olsen Cruise Lines – four smaller ships
- MSC Cruises - eighteen ships; Italian based
- Norwegian Cruise Line - seventeen ships; headquarters in Miami
- Oceania Cruises - six ships (part of NCL); headquarters in Miami
- Regent Seven Seas Cruises - nine ships (part of NCL) headquarters in Miami
- Saga Cruises – two ships Spirit of Adventure and Spirit of Discovery, offering cruises for the over-50s
- Silversea Cruises – Monaco based; Italian flag owned by Royal Caribbean Cruise Line; six ships
- TUI Cruises – based in Germany, six ships

== Freight and cargo ==
=== Containers ===
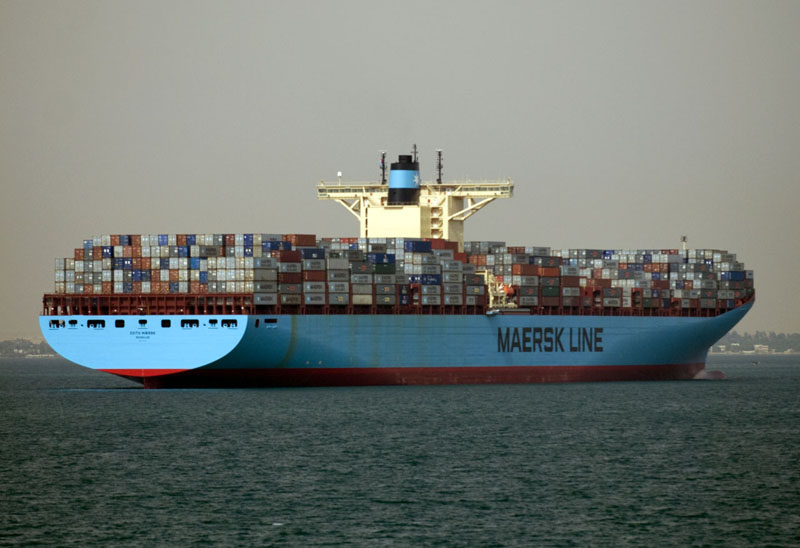
Edith Mærsk. The twenty ships in the class were the world's largest container ships.

The container terminal is operated by DP World Southampton. The container port has 210 acres (85 ha) of land – not counting the 375 acres (152 ha) in the older Western Docks – available for port operations. Loading and unloading operations can be performed simultaneously on four large deep-sea container ships, plus one smaller ship 150 m (500 ft) in length.

This container terminal is Britain's second largest deep-sea terminal, after that at Felixstowe. The railway line from Southampton has been upgraded to the relatively large W10 loading gauge on the route between the container port and the ABP terminal in Birmingham, where it links with lines that have already received this treatment. This allows the railway line to handle the taller containers now in widespread use.

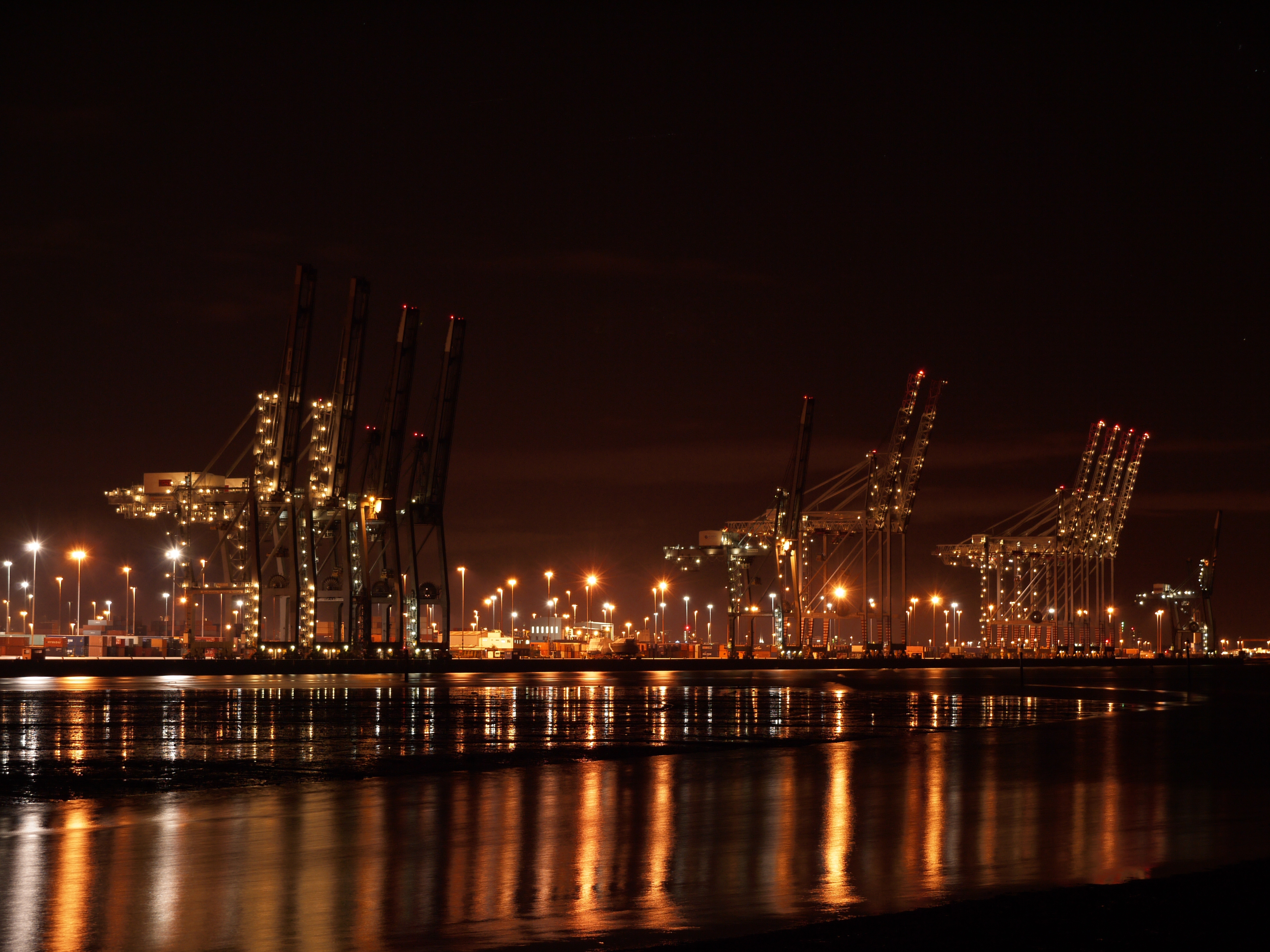
The container port at night

Permission was obtained from the Marine Management Organisation to extend the container terminal into berths 201 and 202. The quay was rebuilt in 2014 to accommodate 400 m (1,300 ft) vessels. The depth of water in the main channel was increased by dredging to 19 m (63 ft). This enabled the berths to accommodate the largest container vessels in service. Work on the project was undertaken by VolkerStevin, part of the VolkerWessels group.

On 20 September 2013, it was announced that Channel Island Lines would continue the "lift-on lift-off" container service between Southampton and Jersey and would purchase the MV Huelin Dispatch from Associated British Ports who in turn had purchased her from the receiver of the Huelin-Renouf bankruptcy.

=== Vehicles ===
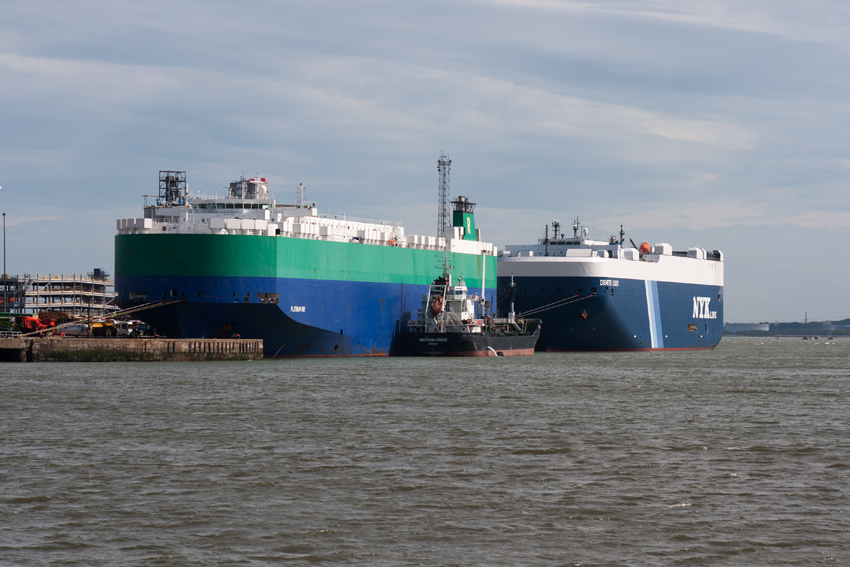
Car transporters berthed at Dock Head

The port has facilities for the import and export of vehicles. Seven multi-storey car park type storage facilities have been constructed, to provide 53 acres (21 ha) of above-ground storage (with another under construction as of 2019). Roll on – roll off vehicle transporters serve all parts of the world; car trains as well as car transporter lorries provide vehicle transport to and from the port within Britain. Southampton has been the UK's leading port for vehicle exports in recent years.

=== Bulk cargos ===
The terminal for bulk goods handles over a million tons annually. A facility processes waste glass into glass cullet, suitable for making new glass bottles. Crushed rocks, gravel, sand, fertilisers, grains and scrap are also handled. A Rank Hovis flour mill formerly dealt with 70,000 tonnes of wheat each year but closed in 2018.

=== Perishable foods ===
There are 156,000 square feet (14,500 m^{2}) of refrigerated storage facilities and a dedicated terminal for fresh fruits and vegetables. The port handles 80,000 tons (tonnes) of such produce, much of it from the Canary Isles, each year.

=== Oil and petroleum products ===
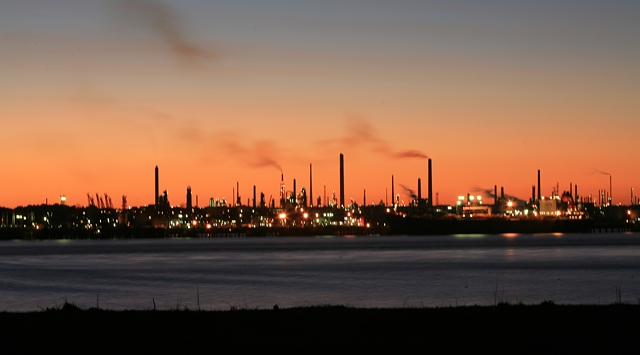
Fawley Refinery

The Esso refinery at nearby Fawley is the largest in the country, providing 20 per cent of the nation's capacity. Its mile-long marine terminal handles 2000 ship movements and 22 million tons (tonnes) of crude oil annually, making it the largest independently owned docks facility in Europe. A direct pipeline, completed in 1972, connects the refinery with the West London Terminal in Hounslow, supplying aviation fuel for Heathrow Airport. A replacement pipeline was completed in November 2023.

The BP Oil Terminal at Hamble provides storage and distribution facilities for crude oil and refined petroleum products. The crude oil arrives by pipeline, and leaves in sea tankers, destined for refineries; refined products reach the terminal by ship and pipeline and are then distributed to customers by road tanker, ship and pipeline.

== Local ferries ==
=== Cross-Solent ferries ===
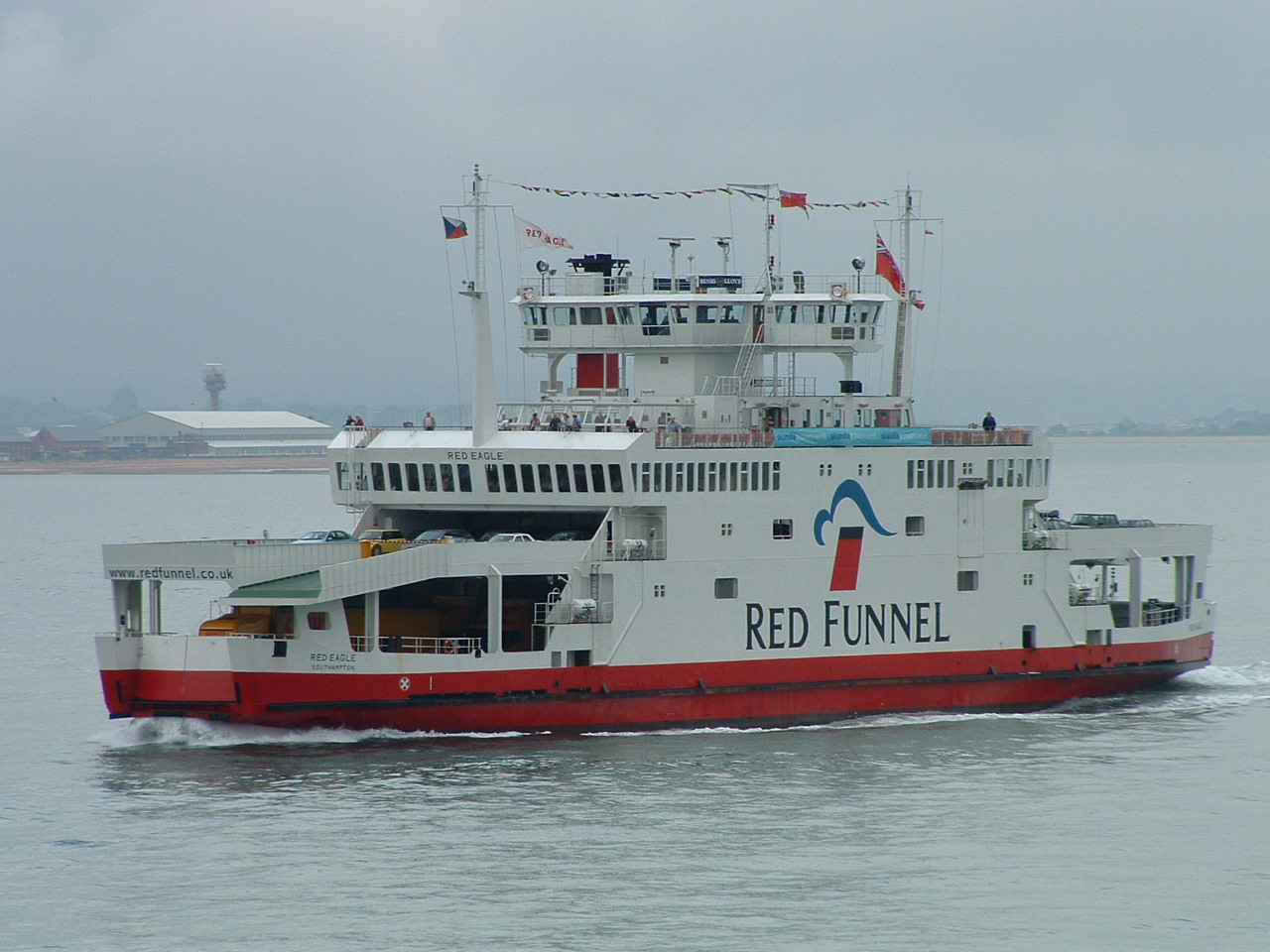
Red Eagle, one of three car ferries that link Southampton and East Cowes

Red Funnel] (The Southampton Isle of Wight and South of England Royal Mail Steam Packet Public Company Ltd) provides two ferry services from the Town Quay area in Southampton to the Isle of Wight. The car ferry service to East Cowes, with a journey time of 50 minutes, is operated by the three 'Raptor' class vessels: Red Falcon, Red Eagle and Red Osprey. The Fast Passenger Ferry service runs to Cowes (which is called "West Cowes" by Red Funnel) in 22 minutes. It is provided by the Red Jet catamarans: 4, 6 and 7. A fourth ferry in Red Funnel's fleet, Red Kestrel is dedicated to freight traffic, entering service in May 2019.

=== Hythe ferry ===
There has been a passenger ferry from Town Quay to the village of Hythe, across Southampton Water, since the Middle Ages. This cuts out a lengthy journey by land across the mouth of the River Test. A 2000 ft (610m) pier opened in 1881; a 2-foot (610 mm) gauge railway, the oldest pier railway in the world, has run along it since 1922. White Horse Ferries of Swindon, the former operator, was replaced in 2017 by the Blue Funnel Group. The crossing takes about 15 minutes.

== Port services ==
=== Towage ===
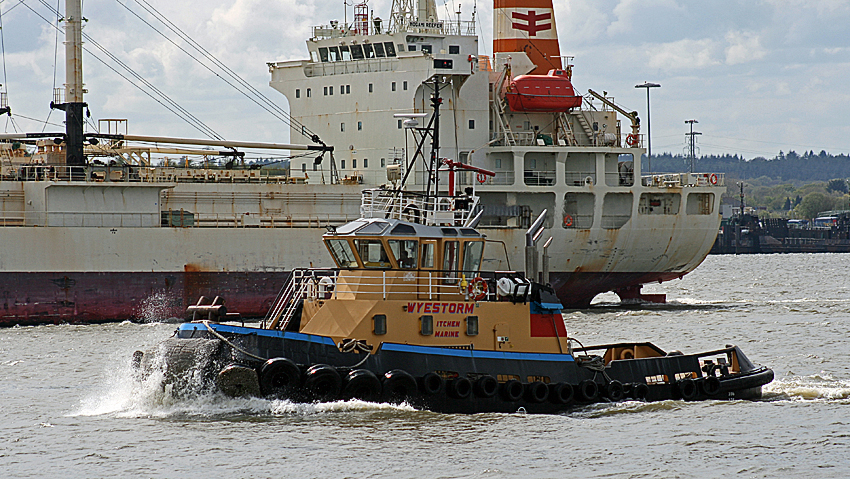
Wyestorm, Itchen Marine tug in Southampton Water

Four companies operate tugs in the port area. Solent Towage, based at Fawley, operates four fire-fighting tugs. Svitzer Marine operates a number of fire-fighting tugs based at Dock Head. Itchen Marine towage operates a fleet of tugs, mooring launches and barges. Tracing their origin to the early 1950s, they are the oldest ship towage provider in Southampton. Williams Shipping operates a small fleet of workboats and barges.

=== Bunkering ===
John H Whitaker operates a small fleet of tankers offering bunkering and other services to the cruise ships visiting the port.

== Boats and small ships ==
=== Marinas ===
Marina facilities are available at Hythe Village Marina across Southampton Water to the south, and at several locations on the River Itchen. Close to the Itchen Bridge there is the Ocean Village Marina to the south of the bridge and to the north there is Itchen Marine Towage's marina along with their tug fleet and fuel dock. Shamrock Quay and Saxon Wharf marinas lie on the western side of the river further upstream, while Kemps Quay marina is on the eastern side. Town Quay marina has a central location close to the Red Jet fast ferry berths. Hythe Village and Shamrock Quay have each been awarded five "Gold Anchors" classifications from The Yacht Harbour Association. Ocean Village has three "Gold Anchors". The Eastern Docks is home to a variety of transport companies and marine service providers, including Williams Shipping who occupy 21 Berth. Towards the western end of the Docks area there are additional berthing and anchoring possibilities, at Marchwood Yacht Club and Eling Sailing Club.

=== Harbour and local pleasure cruises ===
Blue Funnel Cruises offer harbour cruises to view the ships in port, as well as other short day cruises in the Solent area, and "Party Night" type trips etc. The Barkham family began the operation in the 1930s; the current name was adopted in 1965. They run three vessels, Ocean Scene, Ashleigh R and Jenny R from Ocean Village.

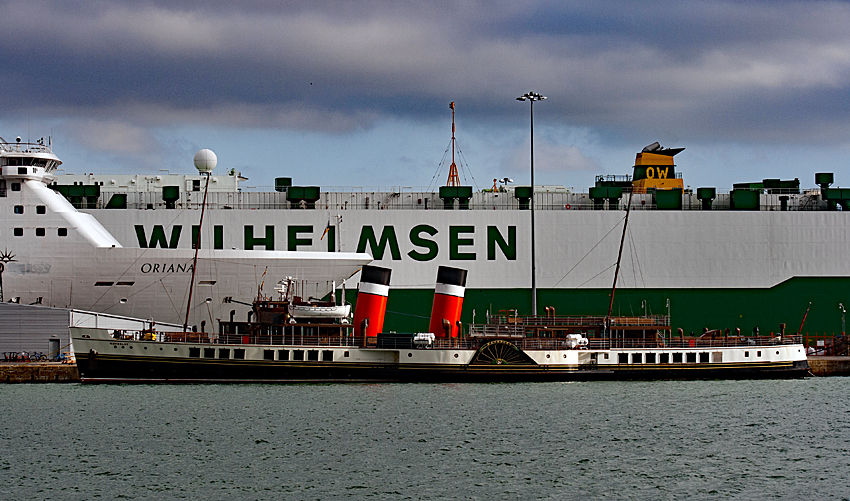
Paddle steamer Waverley at Southampton

PS Waverley, the last seagoing paddle-steamer in the world, runs a small number of slightly longer day cruises from Southampton each year.

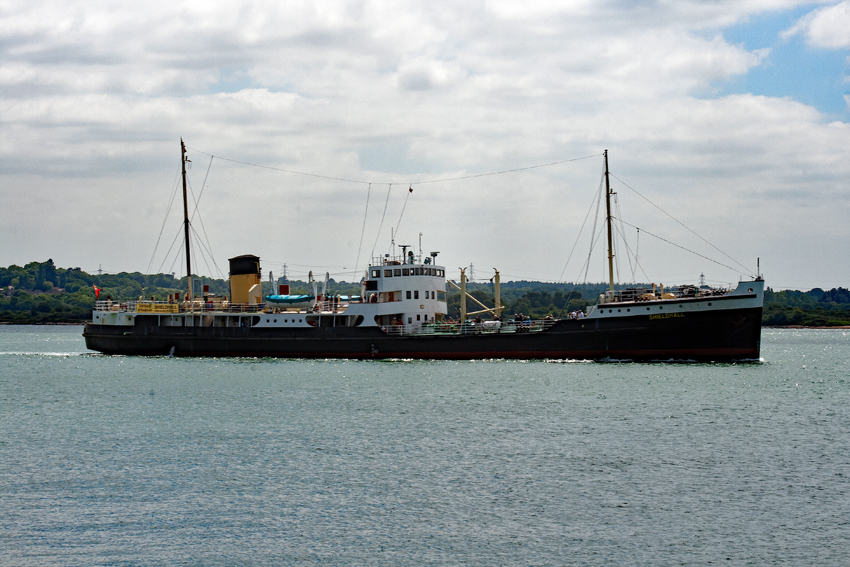
SS Shieldhall in Southampton Water

SS Shieldhall is a heritage ship included in the National Historic Fleet (as is Waverley) and based at Southampton. She is the largest seaworthy working steamship of her type in Britain and probably Europe. As a "Clyde sludge boat", she spent her working life dumping treated sewage, first from Glasgow, later from Southampton. Restored now and managed by a charity, she operates an excursion programme, in addition to providing educational and other services.

=== Boat show ===
The first Southampton International Boat Show took place in 1969. It has been held annually ever since and has become the biggest water-based event of its type in Europe. It usually takes place over ten days in September. The venue is Mayflower Park, overspilling into land at a nearby hotel, and also onto a 1.25-mile (2km) network of temporary pontoons in the water. Around 350 of the boats are exhibited afloat at these pontoons, where potential customers have the opportunity to try them out. In total, 500 exhibitors show over 1000 boats in nearly 12 acres (5 ha) of exhibition space.

== Outer areas of the port ==
=== Southampton Water ===
==== Eastern shore ====
South of Woolston, Southampton has a shingle beach within its boundaries at Weston Shore. The area is popular for sailing small dinghies; in the Solent area, over 60 dinghy sailing clubs cater for this pastime. This is in addition to the 70 plus yacht and sailing clubs and 40 marinas for bigger vessels.

Just beyond the Southampton boundary lies Netley village, with its well-preserved medieval Cistercian monastery, Netley Abbey.

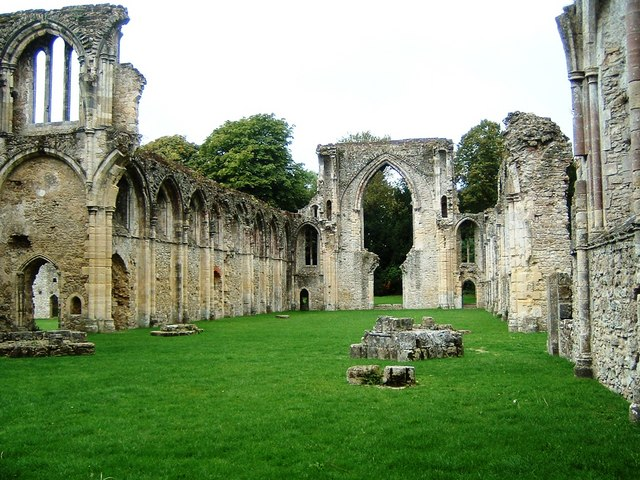
Nave of Netley Abbey

Royal Victoria Country Park on the shore is centred on a chapel which is all that survives of what, when completed in 1836, was the longest building in the world. This is the Royal Victoria Military Hospital, or Netley Hospital, Britain's largest military hospital when in use. It treated 50,000 war wounded from WW I, 68,000 casualties of WW II, and many others before, between and since.

Hamble-le-Rice is the next village to the south, set in a river estuary noted for its wildlife. There is a small oil terminal slightly further north on Southampton Water. For much of the last century, however, Hamble was the village with three airfields, at the centre of an area with up to 26 aircraft manufacturers. The Hamble Aerostructures factory remains busy today. It was a centre for air training from 1931 to 1984. Sir Winston Churchill was one of the many thousands who took flying lessons here. To the south of the village, lies the site of an Iron Age promontory hillfort, Hamble Common Camp.

Across the river Hamble, and linked to it by a small ferry for passengers and pedal cyclists, lies Warsash. This is the last village before the border of the area controlled by ABP Southampton with that controlled by the King's Harbour Master Portsmouth. The River Hamble itself, the third of the three rivers that formed Southampton Water, is controlled by its own harbour authority.

Warsash is another village in which sailing plays an important role, and also has a history of shipbuilding. In addition it is the home of the Maritime Academy, which provides training for future Merchant Navy Officers. The model ships, used for practising operation of large marine vessels were moved in May 2011 from their old base at Marchwood to a new one near Timsbury. The 5 tonnes (4.9 long tons; 5.5 short tons) models are powered, and have control systems which simulate the realistic handling of real ships. The new facility for them at Timsbury Lake near Romsey features models of berths, ship canal locks, narrow channels etc. for use in training the next generation of ships' officers.

==== Western shore ====
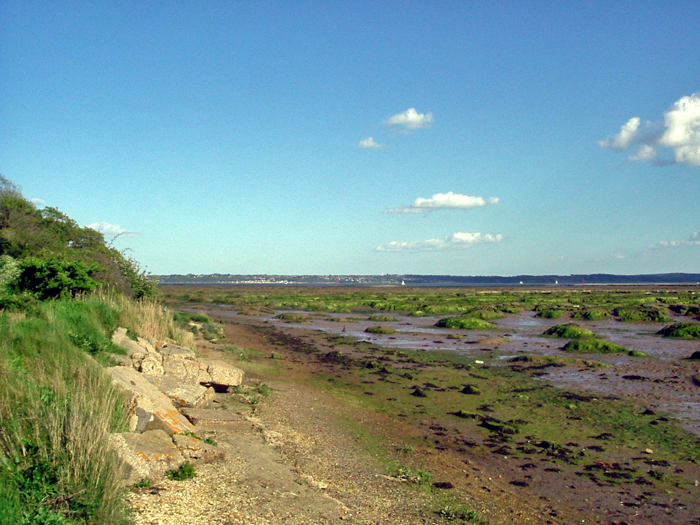
Salt marsh near Lepe

Across the Solent from Warsash, the ABP Harbour limit is at Stone point, near Lepe Country Park. The Department of Transport has responsibility for the safety of navigation within the Western Solent beyond this limit, as it lies outside the jurisdiction of any of the harbour authorities. The foreshore from here to Calshot, the first village to the north-east, is a lightly frequented and rather muddy beach.

At Calshot, with the long row of beach huts, the beach is shingle, and there is much of historical interest. Calshot Castle, built by Henry VIII to govern the port approach stands on Calshot Spit, a mile long (1.6 km) shingle bank, and housed a military garrison until as late as 1956. The area was a base and centre of activity for military flying boats. The hangars along the spit for them now accommodate a large activities centre, with climbing walls, velodrome and dry ski slope. There are also stations and facilities for the lifeboat and coastguard services. Saxon landings in 495, Lawrence of Arabia, the Schneider Trophy and the world's first port radio and radar station all also feature in the history of this tiny village. Beyond Calshot lies the oil-fired 1GW Fawley Power Station; beyond that is the huge Fawley Oil Refinery, with its associated piers for tankers.

Away from the built up areas and industrial facilities, the western shore is dominated by salt marshes, with some reeds. The next village is Hythe, which is associated with Sir Christopher Cockerell. The father of the modern hovercraft lived here for a long time. His friend, Lawrence of Arabia, also lived here, but only for a short time. Hovercraft development and manufacture took place principally at Cowes and Woolston, but also at other locations in the Solent area. There is a museum devoted to them at Lee-on-Solent to the East.

The Hythe Village marina is situated to the north of the village. Between this marina and the Marchwood Military Port, 800 acres (324 ha) of land extending from the shore to a line roughly 900 yards (1 km) inland, is owned by ABP. It is held in reserve for, and likely eventually to be used for, further development of the container port. It adjoins part of the eastern boundary of the New Forest National Park, and port development proposals are always highly emotive and contentious locally.

=== River Itchen ===
The Itchen Bridge is a road bridge that charges tolls, connecting the docks area with Woolston. It spans 2,625 ft (800 m) and the clearance for shipping is 23 metres above Highest Astronomical Tide, 95 ft (29 m) above chart datum. In 1977 it replaced a chain ferry known as the floating bridge, which had been operating since 1838.

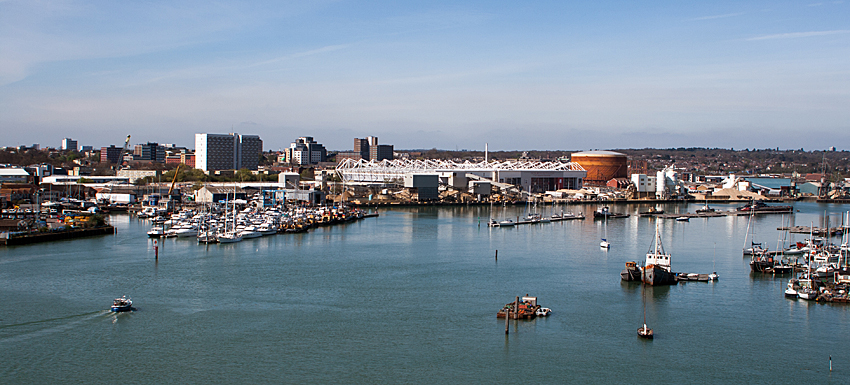
Itchen wharves and St Mary's Stadium

Storage warehouses once lined the banks of the lowest part of the river, but have been demolished. North of the bridge, on the western side, there are yards and wharves used by coastal vessels. These handle low-value, non-perishable and non-urgent bulk goods, including timber, scrap, metals, cement, sand and other quarry products. This trade accounts for 24 per cent by weight of internal goods transport in Britain. The imposing modern structure of St Mary's Stadium – the home of Southampton F.C. – stands close to the river here, just inland of the coasters' yards.

A shipbuilding firm, Day Summers & Co., was active between 1840 and 1929 in this area. Today this part of the river is occupied by the marinas, and also by many more small wharves, quays and shipyards, which provide homes for small to medium-sized boating-related businesses. The next two crossings are Northam Bridge, a part of the city's main eastern approach route, linking Bitterne Manor to Northam, and the railway bridge which carries the lines linking Southampton with Portsmouth and Brighton.

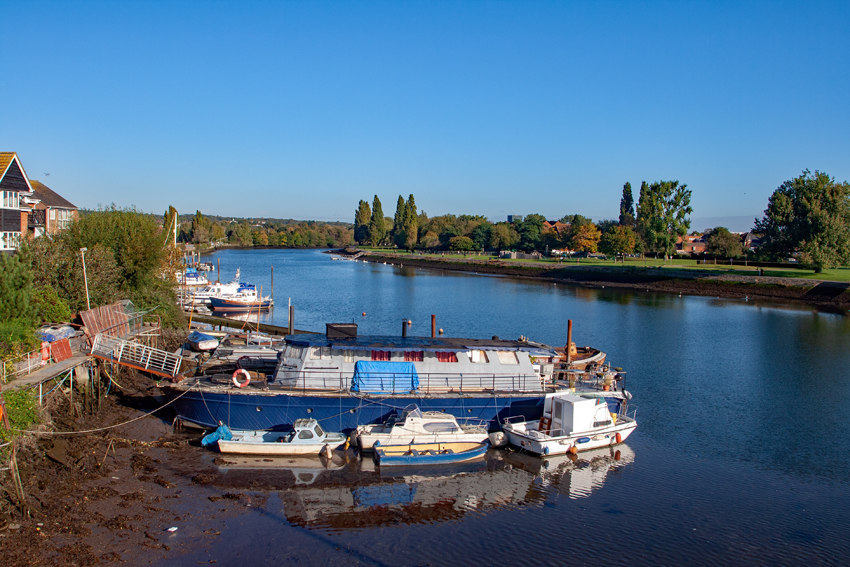
View upstream from Cobden Bridge

Upstream of these, only a little commercial activity takes place on the river or its banks. Some residences having river frontages use them as moorings for small boats, and a number of private houseboats are berthed. One more large road bridge, Cobden Bridge, connects St Denys and Bitterne Park. More houseboats are berthed to the north of it on the Western side, otherwise the riversides are occupied by parkland and the Portswood Sewage Treatment Works for much of the next stretch, as far as Woodmill Bridge. The tidal section of the river, for which the Port of Southampton is the navigation authority, ends here. The river Itchen upstream is noted as one of the world's premier chalk streams for fly fishing.

=== River Test ===
Car storage compounds within the docks now extend close to the bridges carrying the main Southampton – Bournemouth railway line and the busy A35 dual carriageway. The tidal section of the river, and the area of the navigation authority of The Port of Southampton, end in Redbridge, at a point close to these transport structures. The name of the bridge here comes from the abundant reeds in the area – "Reedbridge"; it was never red in colour. The River Test is even more famous than the Itchen in the world of fly fishing.

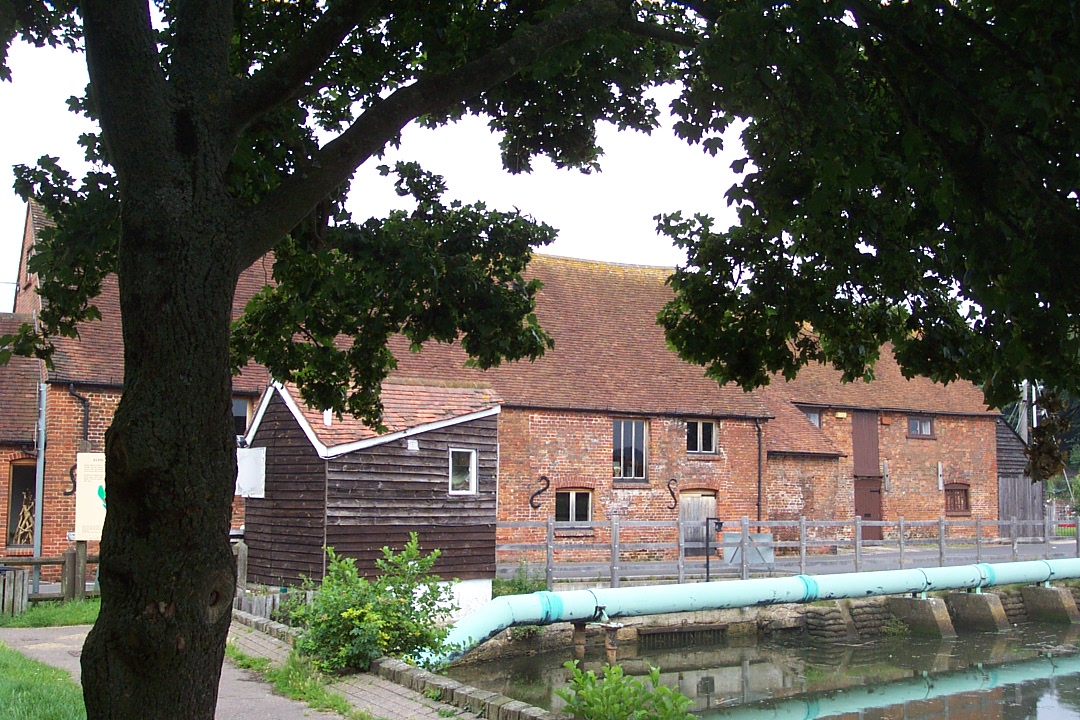
Eling Tide Mill

The village of Eling, with its sailing club and moorings for small boats, faces the container terminal to the south-west. It features a Norman parish church, one of the two working tide mills left in Britain, and a mediæval toll bridge that still charges users.

Two miles (3.2 km) of undeveloped foreshore, mainly reeds, shingle and mud lie downstream from Eling, opposite the container port; then comes industrialised Marchwood, facing the western docks. A high-efficiency gas-fired 840 MW power station opened here in early 2010, replacing an older facility. The prominent 360 ft (110m) wide by 118 ft (36m) high aluminium dome is an electricity-generating refuse incinerator known as Marchwood Incinerator; it too has recently replaced an outdated predecessor. There is also a sewage treatment works. Leaving the industrial estate comes Cracknore Hard. This area was home to Husband's Shipyard, famed for wooden military craft including minesweepers, and also yachts and fishing boats. The British Military Powerboat Team more recently assembled an interesting collection of historic military powerboats in the old Husband sheds, but they have left and gone to Portsmouth. A marina and hotel are planned for this site. Beyond lies Marchwood Military Port.

== Other activities ==
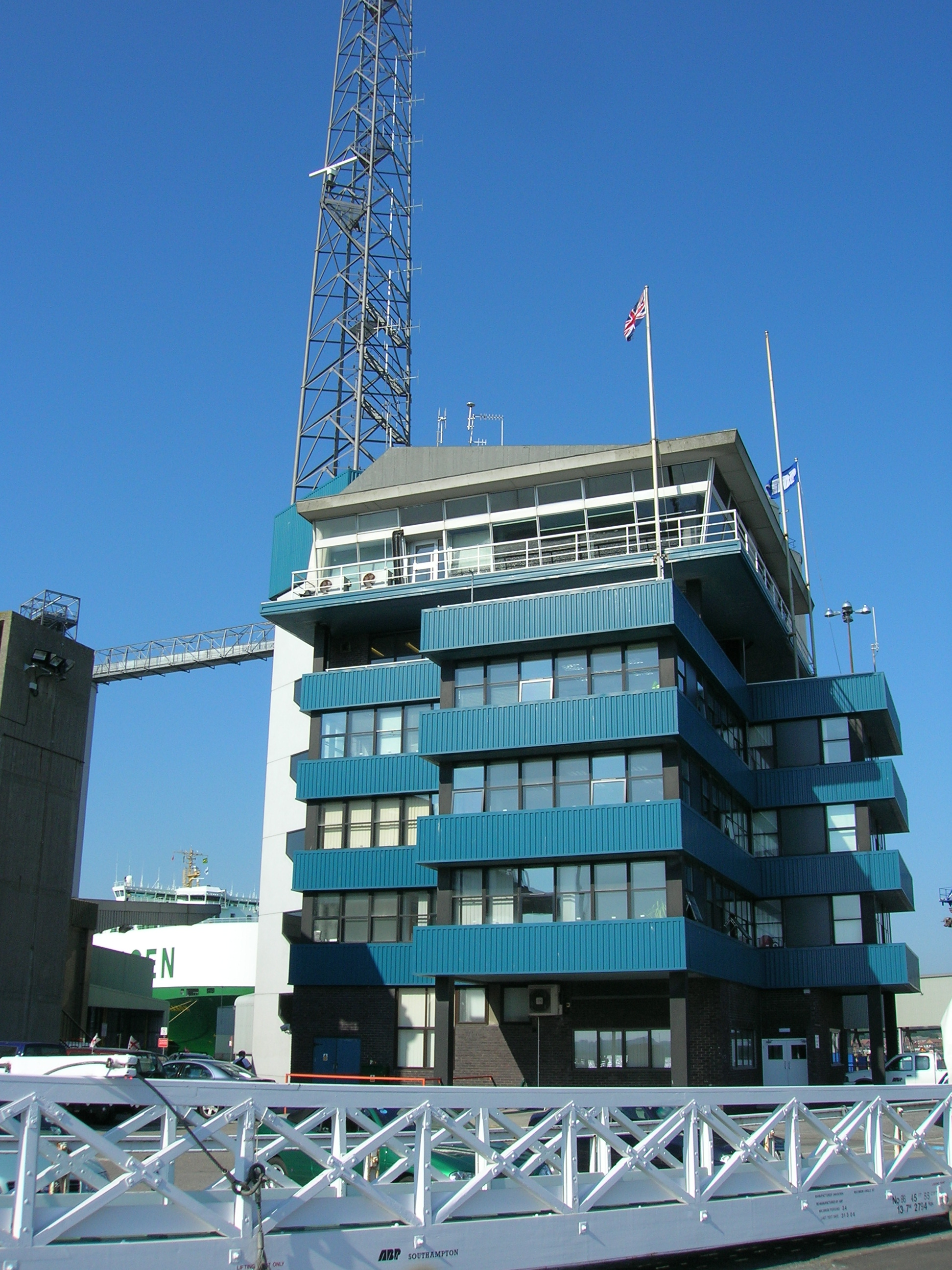
VTS Control Centre Southampton Docks

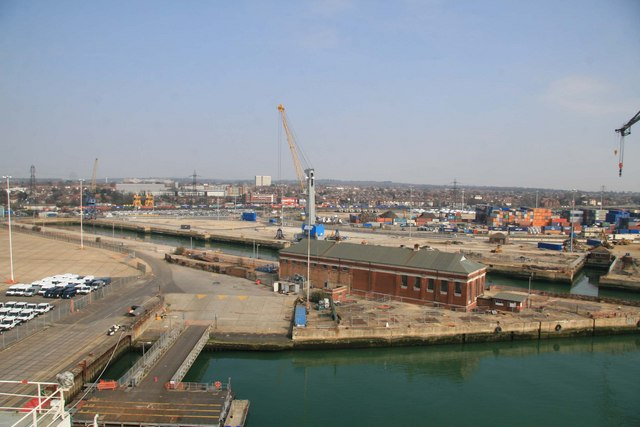
King George V dry dock

Other port-related activities include:

- Shipping agents
- Ships' chandlers
- Harbourmaster
- HM Revenue & Customs
- UK Visas and Immigration
- Southampton Port health services
- Hampshire Constabulary Marine Support Unit
- HM Coastguards Maritime Rescue Coordination Centre Lee-on-Solent
- Royal National Lifeboat Institution – The Calshot Lifeboat
- The Southampton Seafarers Centre
- Pilots
- The VTS (Vessel Traffic Services) Centre Control Room
- Dredging
- Fuel supplies
- Freightliner Rail
- PT Contractors Ltd. – (resident building and civil engineering contractors)
- Headquarters – Marine Accident Investigation Branch of the Department for Transport
- Headquarters – Maritime & Coastguard Agency
- H. J. Baker Sulphur Forming Plant
