= English carrack Holigost =

Carrack of Henry V's Navy

History

Castile
- Name: Santa Clara
- Owner: Castilian Navy
- Out of service: c. 1413–14

History

England
- Name: Holigost
- Namesake: The Holy Ghost
- Owner: English crown
- Acquired: c. 1413–14
- Commissioned: 17 November 1415
- Out of service: 1422
- Motto: Une sanz pluis; (French "One and no more")
- Fate: Sank

General characteristics
- Tons burthen: 750–760 tons b.o.m.
- Length: In excess of 30 m (98 ft)
- Beam: In excess of 12 m (39 ft)
- Propulsion: Sails
- Sail plan: Carrack
- Complement: 200 sailors plus up to 260 troops
- Armament: 7 cannon, 102 gads, bows and arrows, spears, poleaxes.

Holigost (sometimes rendered as Holy Ghost) was a carrack of the English navy rebuilt for Henry V. Originally a Castilian vessel called Santa Clara, she was captured c. 1413–14. She served until 1422 and later sank at her moorings. Her wreck is believed to have been found in the River Hamble, Hampshire, near the wreck of her larger contemporary, the Grace Dieu. The wreck is a Protected Wreck managed by Historic England.

== Description ==
Holigost was a carrack, measuring in excess of 98 feet (30 m) length and 39 feet (12 m) beam. She was measured at 760 tons Builder's Old Measurement. The ship had a crew of about 200 sailors. She also carried up to 260 troops. Armament was seven cannon, 102 gads (iron spears), bows and arrows, spears and poleaxes.

== History ==
Holigost was the second of the four "great ships" commissioned by Henry V, and which also included the Trinity Royal, Jesus, and Grace Dieu. She was originally a Castilian ship, Santa Clara, which was captured in 1413–14 and subsequently rebuilt. Holigost "joined the royal fleet" on 17 November 1415. She saw action in at least two battles during the Hundred Years' War. She participated in a naval battle off Harfleur in 1416. Following repairs to damage received there, she participated in a battle off Saint-Denis-Chef-de-Cove in 1417. Holigost was withdrawn from service in 1422 — the year of Henry's death — and laid up in the River Hamble, Southamptonshire. Repairs made in 1423 by Davy Owen may be the earliest recorded use of a diver in ship repair in England. It is believed that she eventually sank in the Hamble due to a lack of maintenance.

== Wreck ==
In 2015, it was announced that it was thought that the wreck of Holigost lay in the River Hamble. The site is close to that of Grace Dieu, another of Henry's ships. The wreck had been identified on an aerial photograph taken in the 1970s. Historic England is taking steps to protect the wreck before it is surveyed. A lack of funding is the reason behind the 40-year delay between the discovery of the wreck and work to survey the vessel beginning. The survey will include the use of dendrochronology, drones, remote sensing and sonar.

== See also ==
- Quanzhou ship
- Baochuan
- Jong (ship)
