= River Hamble Country Park =

Country Park in Hampshire, England

Coordinates: 50.899°N 1.289°W

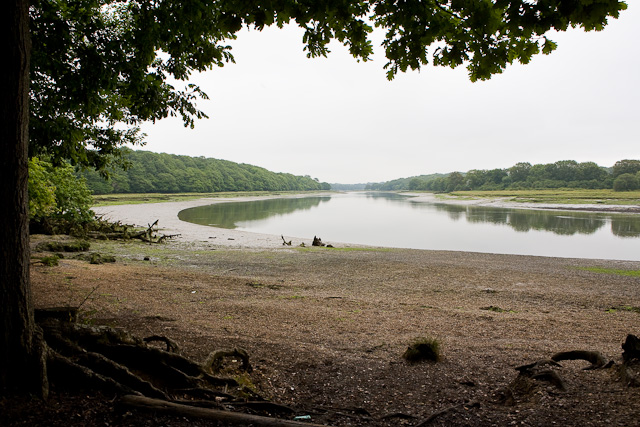
- The River Hamble as seen from the Country Park
- Interactive map of River Hamble Country Park
- Type: Country park
- Location: Hampshire, England
- OS grid: SU 501 114
- Area: 144.1 hectares (356 acres)
- Opened: 1979
- Operator: Hampshire County Council
- Open: Open year-round
- Awards: Green Flag Award
- Paths: Strawberry Trail
- Water: River Hamble
- Website: Official website
- Upper Hamble Estuary and Woods SSSI
- Site of Special Scientific Interest
- Area of search: Hampshire
- Grid reference: SU 507 111
- Interest: Biological
- Area: 370 acres (151 hectares)
- Notification date: 1987
- Location map: Magic Map

River Hamble Country Park is a 144.1-hectare (356-acre) country park which runs along the west bank of the River Hamble between the villages of Botley and Bursledon in Hampshire. It is owned by Hampshire County Council and managed by Hampshire Countryside Service.

== History ==
The ancient duckpond in Manor Farm and the neighbouring St Bartholomew's Church are mentioned in Domesday. There is evidence of a Roman road running through the site, which would have been the route between the Roman settlements of Clausentum (Bitterne Manor) and Portus Adurni (Portchester).

In 1439, the Grace Dieu was struck by lightning, and burnt and sank on the river running alongside the park. The wreck is now marked by a warning pole, which is a yellow cross. Part of the play area in the 'Barnfield' area is based on the wreck. The wreck is now protected.

In 1943, the Royal Navy shore establishment named HMS Cricket was opened. It would be used throughout the rest of World War II to help prepare for D-Day. Once decommissioned in 1946, the buildings that were left behind by the Royal Navy were used to house citizens of Southampton who were displaced by bombing. The site was then known as "The Cricket Camp", until 1952 when it was no longer required for that purpose. The former guardhouse is the only building still standing at the park, which is currently used as the rangers' depot.

The park first opened in 1979 as Upper Hamble Country Park and in 1984 the Manor Farm museum was opened to the north of the site as a wartime museum. The museum site was once at the heart of the village of Botley.

In 2019 it was reported that Hampshire County Council would be investing £800,000 into the country park through the construction of a new visitor centre, replacement of play equipment and the improvement of wayfinding and walking routes across the site.

== Manor Farm ==
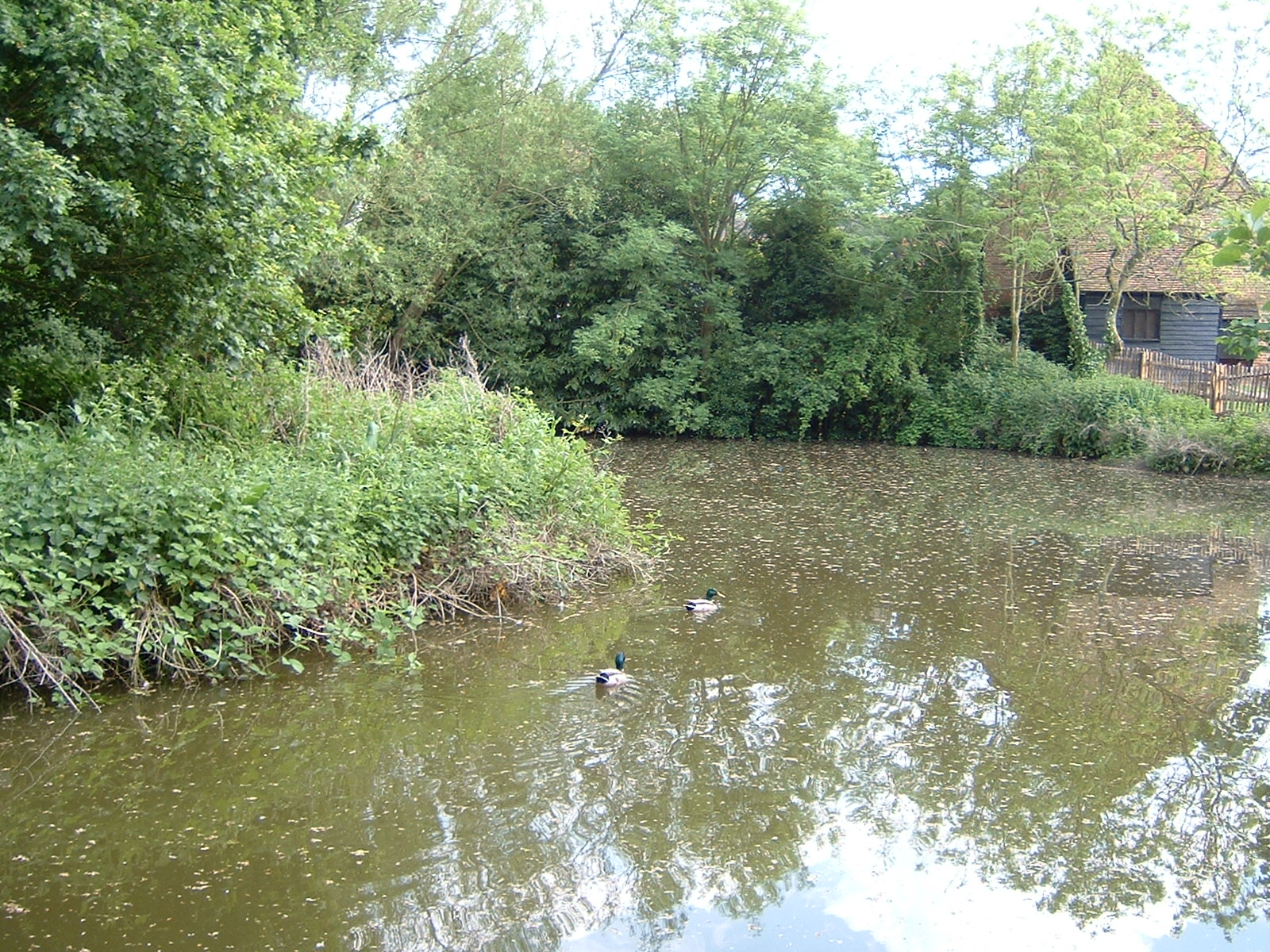
The ancient duckpond at Manor Farm.

Within the country park at the north east of the park lies Manor Farm, a farm attraction with its own opening hours and pricing policy. It opened in 1984 as the Manor Farm museum and has since developed into a family-focused visitor attraction within the setting of the historic farmyard run by Hampshire County Council.

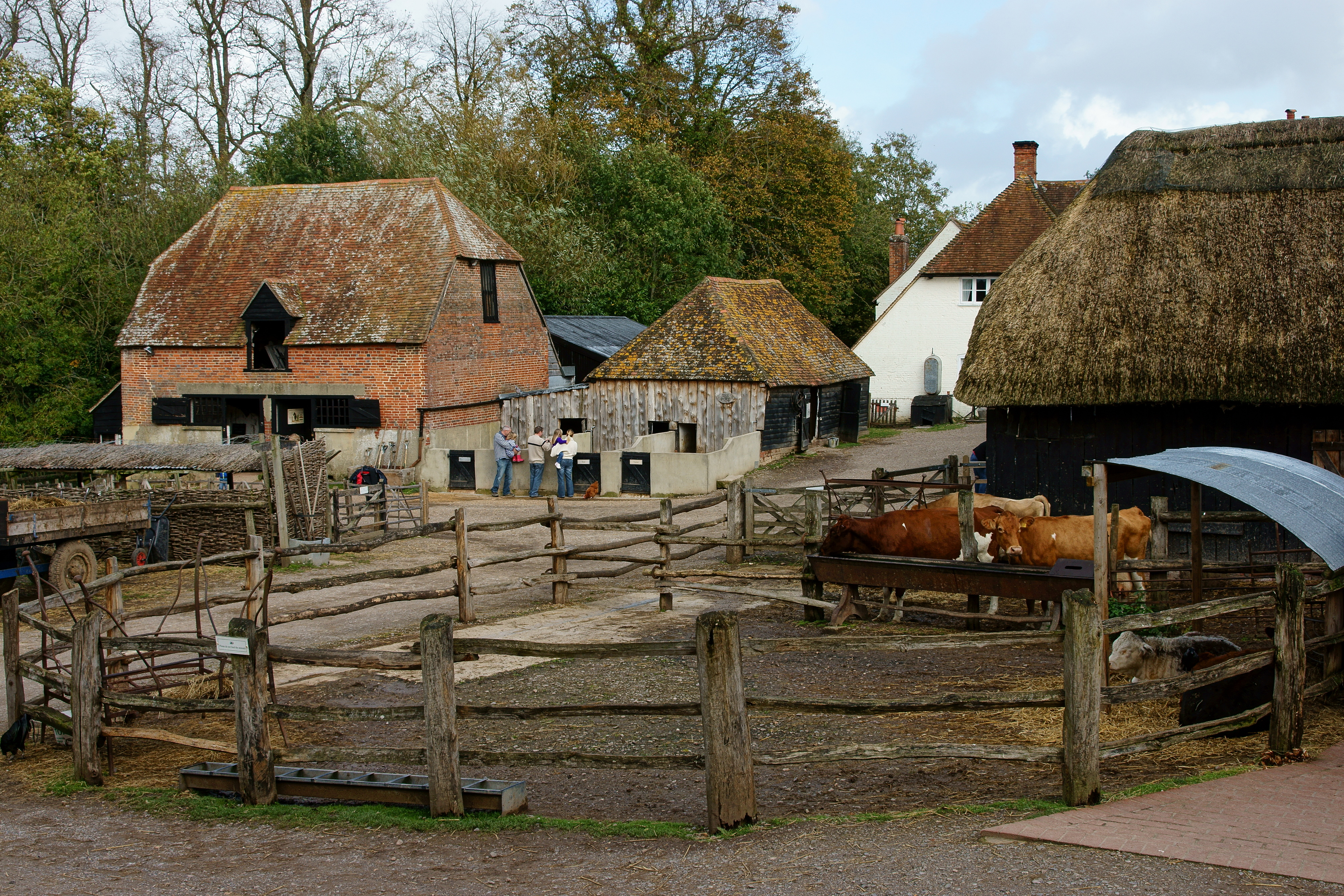
Manor Farm in 2012

The site includes historic buildings that link to the heritage of the site and the original museum including a forge, wheelwrights, farmhouse and Victorian schoolhouse. The ancient duckpond and the neighbouring St Bartholomew's Church also form part of the location.

Popular activities on offer at the farm include daily animal interactions and feeding, story time and Victorian school lessons. Other on-site facilities include a visitor centre and gift shop in the 18th-century threshing barn, a large indoor children's play area – the Playbarn – and a café for visitors, as well as amenities such as toilets and an education centre for visiting school groups.

Manor Farm was the location for the historical documentary TV series Wartime Farm, broadcast by the BBC in 2012.

== Facilities ==
The park has two main areas, the 'Barnfield' and the 'Toplands Field'.

The Barnfield has a large barn, which is a café and visitor centre, which was completed in 2021. The field also has a large park.

The 'Toplands Field' has a dog field and some barbecue pitches.

The site also includes the location of Cricket Camp Scout Activity Centre, used by Itchen Scouts as well as the Queen Elizabeth II Silver Jubilee Activities Centre.

== Strawberry Trail ==
Strawberry Trail Route

The Strawberry Trail is a 15-mile (24 km) footpath along the River Hamble. It starts in Botley, then runs through the River Hamble Country Park to Bursledon, where it splits to Hamble-le-Rice and then on to Netley. From here it loops back to Bursledon. The path also passes through the Royal Victoria Country Park and the Hamble Common. The path is named after the area's strawberry trade, which boomed in the 1860s. Trains called 'Strawberry Specials' would take the fruit from the area to the Covent Garden Market.
