= Upper Hamble Estuary and Woods =

Protected area in Hampshire, England

Coordinates: 50.897°N 1.280°W

- Site of Special Scientific Interest
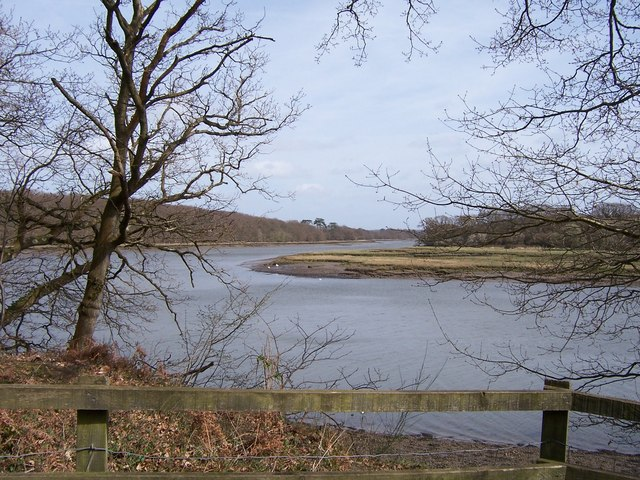
- Location of Upper Hamble Estuary and Woods.
- Area of search: Hampshire
- Grid reference: SU 507 111
- Interest: Biological
- Area: 151.2 hectares (374 acres)
- Notification date: 1987
- Location map: Magic Map

Upper Hamble Estuary and Woods is a 151.2-hectare (374-acre) biological Site of Special Scientific Interest east of Southampton in Hampshire. It is part of Solent and Southampton Water Ramsar site and Special Protection Area, and of Solent Maritime Special Area of Conservation. Part of the site is in Manor Farm Country Park, which is a Local Nature Reserve.

== Features ==
This site comprises the upper estuary of the River Hamble, together with adjoining saltmarsh, reedswamp and ancient semi-natural woodland. The woods have a diverse ground flora and invertebrate fauna. There is also a narrow zone of mudflats, with large numbers of marine worms, crustaceans and molluscs, which provide food for birds.
