= HMS Cricket (shore establishment) =

Former stone frigate training establishment of the Royal Navy

Coordinates: 50.898°N 1.296°W

History

United Kingdom
- Name: HMS Cricket
- Commissioned: 15 July 1943
- Decommissioned: 15 July 1946
- Fate: Decommissioned

General characteristics
- Class & type: Stone frigate

HMS Cricket was the name given to a Royal Navy shore establishment on the River Hamble from 1943 to 1946. This name was previously used by the Insect-class gunboat Cricket (1915) that was scrapped in 1942.

HMS Cricket was commissioned on 15 July 1943. Initially it was a "Royal Marine Landing Craft Crew Training Base". It was established as an independent command with accounts being handled by HMS Shrapnel. The base was later used to assemble troops and landing craft in the build-up to D-day. From 23 May 1944, during the final preparations for D-Day, the base was completely sealed. During the base's operation, she was assigned a number of depot ships. The first was the Nab Happy Lass, from the time of commissioning until 30 April 1945. She was replaced by harbour launch 30455 until May that year, and was then succeeded by the petrol powered harbour launch 436622 until March 1946.

It was decided to close HMS Cricket after the end of the Second World War, a decision taken on 1 March 1946. The last arrivals were on 20 May 1946 and Cricket was probably decommissioned on 15 July 1946, three years after commissioning.

Its buildings were used for temporary post-war accommodation for the civilian population of Southampton.

River Hamble Country Park now occupies this site. Itchen South scouts operate a scout campsite, named Cricket Camp, on part of the land.
