= Hamble–Warsash Ferry =

Ferry in Hampshire, England

Hamble Ferry
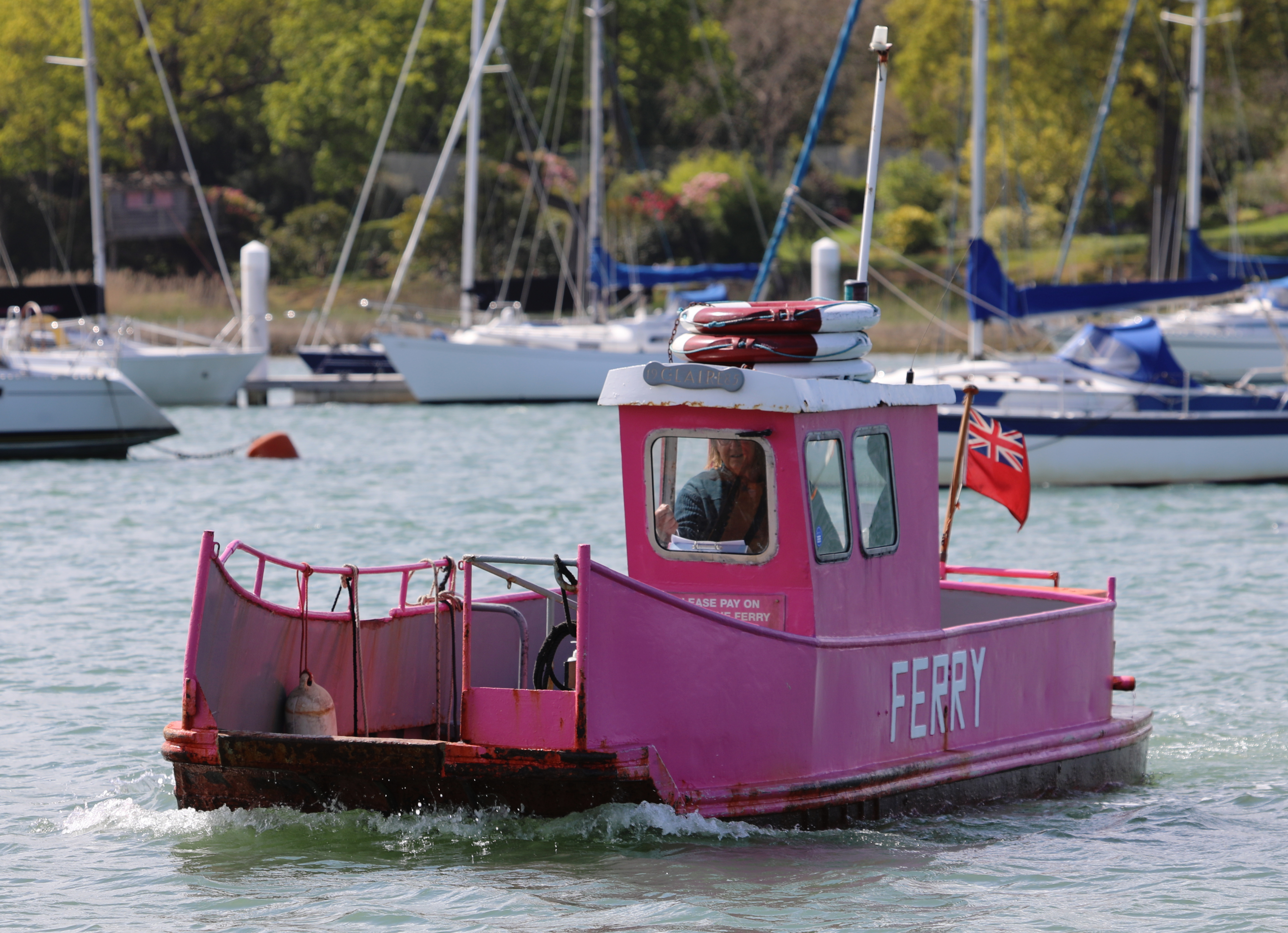
- Locale: Hampshire, England
- Waterway: Hamble River
- Began operation: 1493 or earlier
- No. of vessels: 2
- No. of terminals: 2
- Website: http://www.hambleferry.co.uk

The Hamble–Warsash Ferry is an 'on-demand' passenger ferry service on the River Hamble in Hampshire, England. The ferry operates between Hamble-le-Rice on the west bank of the river and Warsash on the east.

The current service is the latest incarnation of a service that has operated for several centuries; there are records of a ferry across the Hamble is in 1493. It was an important link on the route between the cities of Portsmouth and Southampton. It was also a key link in more than one pilgrimage route. The ferry now provides a link in local, national and international footpaths such as the Solent Way and cycle routes such as National Cycle Route 2.

Before the introduction of motorised ferries passengers were rowed across the river for the price of one penny each way. The current motorised ferries (Claire and Emily) each carry a maximum of twelve foot passengers and are painted in a pink livery, having been painted white until a change of ownership in 2002. The pink paint scheme is echoed on the shelter by the landing on the east bank of the river. A water taxi and mooring service are also operated by the ferry company.

Throughout the nineteen sixties and seventies the ferry was run by Ray Sedgwick, a local boatman who hired boats out to tourists. The ferry shelter on the Warsash side was built in the early 1900s by the Bugle pub who sold beer to other local pubs. The shelter was used to store kegs as well as providing shelter from the rain.
