= Hamble Common =

Public common and scheduled monument in Hamble, Hampshire

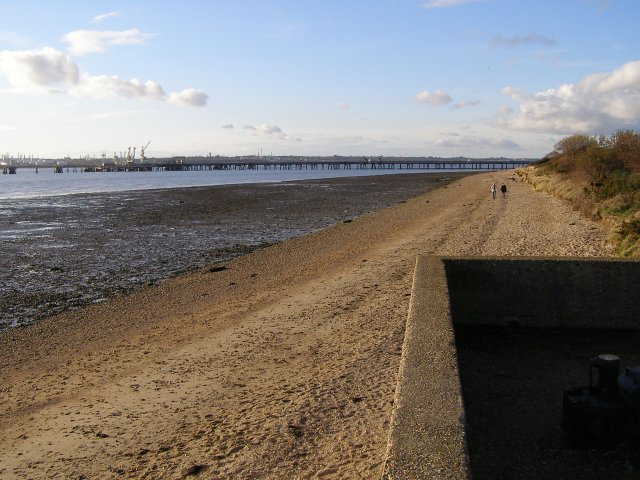
- The shoreline at low-tide

- Shown within Hampshire
- Type: Public park
- Location: Hamble-le-Rice, Hampshire, England
- Coordinates: 50°51′9″N 1°19′3″W
- Area: 55 acres (22 ha)
- Operator: Eastleigh Borough Council
- Open: Open year-round
- Paths: Solent Way; England Coast Path; Hamble Rail Trail; Strawberry Trail
- Water: Southampton Water
- Website: Official website

Scheduled monument
- Official name: Promontory defined by an Iron Age linear earthwork, St Andrew's Castle and additional remains on Hamble Common
- Designated: 7 August 1982; 44 years ago
- Reference no.: 1008695
- Lee-on-The Solent to Itchen Estuary SSSI
- Site of Special Scientific Interest
- Area of search: Hampshire
- Grid reference: SU 487 059
- Interest: Biological/Geological
- Area: 1,450 acres (585 hectares)
- Notification date: 1992

Hamble Common is a Public Park, Public Common and Scheduled Monument in Hamble-le-Rice, Hampshire, not too far from Southampton. The site is 22-hectare (220,000 m^{2}) and formerly hosted an Iron Age settlement as well as a Tudor Castle. The Common is bounded by the Southampton Water, River Hamble and the village of Hamble.

Due to the site's environmental position, the site is part of the 'Lee-on-The Solent to Itchen Estuary Site of Special Scientific Interest' due to its wide range of habitats including coastal heath, woodland, saltmarsh and mudflats, which attract a large range of birds. The area is owned and managed by Eastleigh Borough Council. The site contains Hamble Point, which is a spit formed by the River Hamble meets the Southampton Water.

== Iron Age settlement ==
The site has a 'Linear bank' as well as a ditch, which is of Iron Age origin. This divided the western half of the site from what is now Hamble Point. The site is now referred to as Hamble Common Camp. This is believed to be an Iron Age settlement, with the ditch being a defensive structure. The 'wet nature' of the area has ensured that most of these structures have remained intact. Some have suggested this site could have been a promontory fort.

== 12th century ==
By this point, the land belonged to the St Andrew Priory, which was located to the north of the site. This was a small Benedictine Priory, which forms the basis of the modern day village church. Pannage - where pigs are released to eat fallen acorns - was allowed to take place in the autumn, with timber being collected from the site, to supply local houses as well as the local ship building industry.

== 16th century ==
Between 1542 and 1543, St Andrews Castle was constructed on the common, as part of the Kings Devices Program. This was one of a few castles that protected the Solent. This castle had a Keep and a gun platform, which was surrounded by a moat. The castle has been destroyed by coastal erosion, with the foundations being visible at low tide.

== Modern history ==
In the 19th Century, a gun battery was constructed on the site, in response to the Napoleonic Wars. At the start of WW2, two anti-aircraft guns were created in the area. The platforms of these still survive today, though the guns were removed after the end of the war. In 1989, a replica Bofors Gun was placed on one of the platforms, though this has since been moved into the car park, due to the threat of coastal erosion on the platform.
