= Sowley Pond =

Man-made water-body

Coordinates: 50.770°N 1.470°W

- Site of Special Scientific Interest
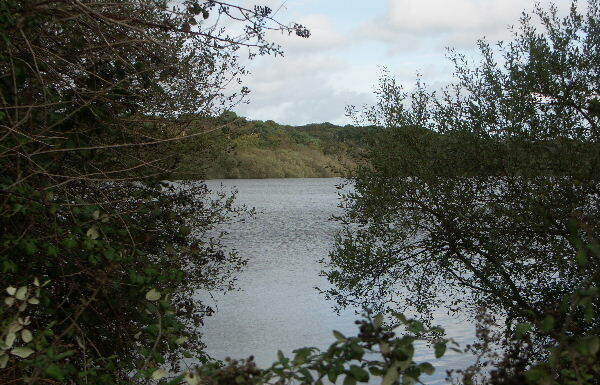
- Location of Sowley Pond.
- Area of search: Hampshire
- Grid reference: SZ 375 968
- Interest: Biological
- Area: 49.3 hectares (122 acres)
- Notification date: 1984
- Location map: Magic Map

Sowley Pond is a man-made water-body at the core of a 49.3-hectare (122-acre) biological Site of Special Scientific Interest of the same name, east of Lymington in Hampshire. The pond itself constitutes only about a third of the area of the SSSI. It is part of Solent and Southampton Water Ramsar site and Special Protection Area. It is an important refuge for both surface feeding and diving ducks and functions as an integral part of the marshland system of the west Solent.

== Location ==
Sowley Pond is situated on the southern edge of the New Forest, approximately 1 km from the Solent and is midway between Lymington and Buckler's Hard. The road crossing the dam that was constructed to form the pond is part of the Solent Way long-distance footpath.

== History ==
Sowley Pond was formed in the fourteenth century by monks from nearby Beaulieu Abbey who dammed the Crockford stream, which rises on Beaulieu Heath, to form a fishery.

During the seventeenth and eighteenth centuries, the pond was used to supply water for an ironworks situated on the opposite side of the road on what is now Sandpit Lane.

== The ironworks ==
The Sowley ironworks were completed in the 1590s by the Earl of Southampton. It had a tenuous existence during the 17th century, but with the rapid expansion of Portsmouth dockyard the works were taken over by Henry Corbett, a specialist blacksmith from London, who set up a forge at Beaulieu in conjunction with Sowley. He was financed by Edmund Dummer, a former surveyor of the Navy, and naval contracts for wrought iron followed. Corbett died in 1708 and Dummer continued the business until 1712 when he went bankrupt and his brother Thomas (an ex-navy purser) continued to supply the navy until 1716. By the 1790s, the ironworks were leased by Charles Pocock who lived at the adjacent Sowley House but the ironworks became uneconomic and ceased operating after the Napoleonic Wars. The forge continued to operate until about 1822.

At various times a water powered blast furnace existed as well as (intermittently) a finery forge. In the 1750s an air furnace was built. Today, the site of the furnace is indicated by a patch of reddened earth, around which is a heavy concentration of furnace slag. The site of the forge is near the edge of a hollow (wheelpit) below the dam, where heavy concentrations of forge cinder marks are evident. There is a local saying that "the Sowley hammer can be heard" which means that rain is on the way.

== Sowley House ==
The house, which is situated to the south of the pond, is privately owned and not open to the public. In 2001, it was occupied by Otto and Catharina van der Vorm, from the Netherlands. The gardens have large quantities of rare orchids and wild flower meadows which extend down to the Solent shore.

The former Forge Hammer Inn adjacent to the house and ironworks was used by smugglers in the eighteenth century to hide contraband. The goods were landed at nearby Pitts Deep Hard and hidden in the cellars of the inn. During one raid by the coastguard the landlady was despatched to divert the coastguards while the tubs of illicit brandy were moved from their hiding place in the chimney to the safety of a nearby copse of trees. "The landlady advanced upon them. Singling out one of the officers who owed her a score for...liquid refreshment, she abused him roundly for not paying his debts..." When the contraband was safe, the landlady admitted the coastguard, who found nothing, and were once more abused for interfering with the business of honest citizens.

== Flora ==
Among the tree and plant species found at Sowley are:

- Oak
- Scots pine
- Hazel
- Common hawthorn
- Butcher’s broom
- Wood spurge
- Early purple orchid
- Lesser quaking-grass

== Fauna ==
Sowley is the home to many species of bird, including:

- Mallard
- Eurasian wigeon
- Eurasian teal
- Tufted duck
- Common pochard
- Great crested grebe
- Grey heron

The heronry at Sowley is one of the largest in Hampshire; in 2018 this held 17 occupied nests.

Variable damselfly also breed at Sowley Pond.

In the 1900s, King Edward VII presented a pair of sika deer to John, the second Baron Montagu of Beaulieu. This pair escaped into Sowley Wood and were the basis of the large herds of sika to be found in the forest today. They were so prolific that culling had to be introduced in the 1930s to control numbers.
