= Solent Way =

Long-distance footpath in Hampshire, England

Coordinates: 50.724°N 1.600°W

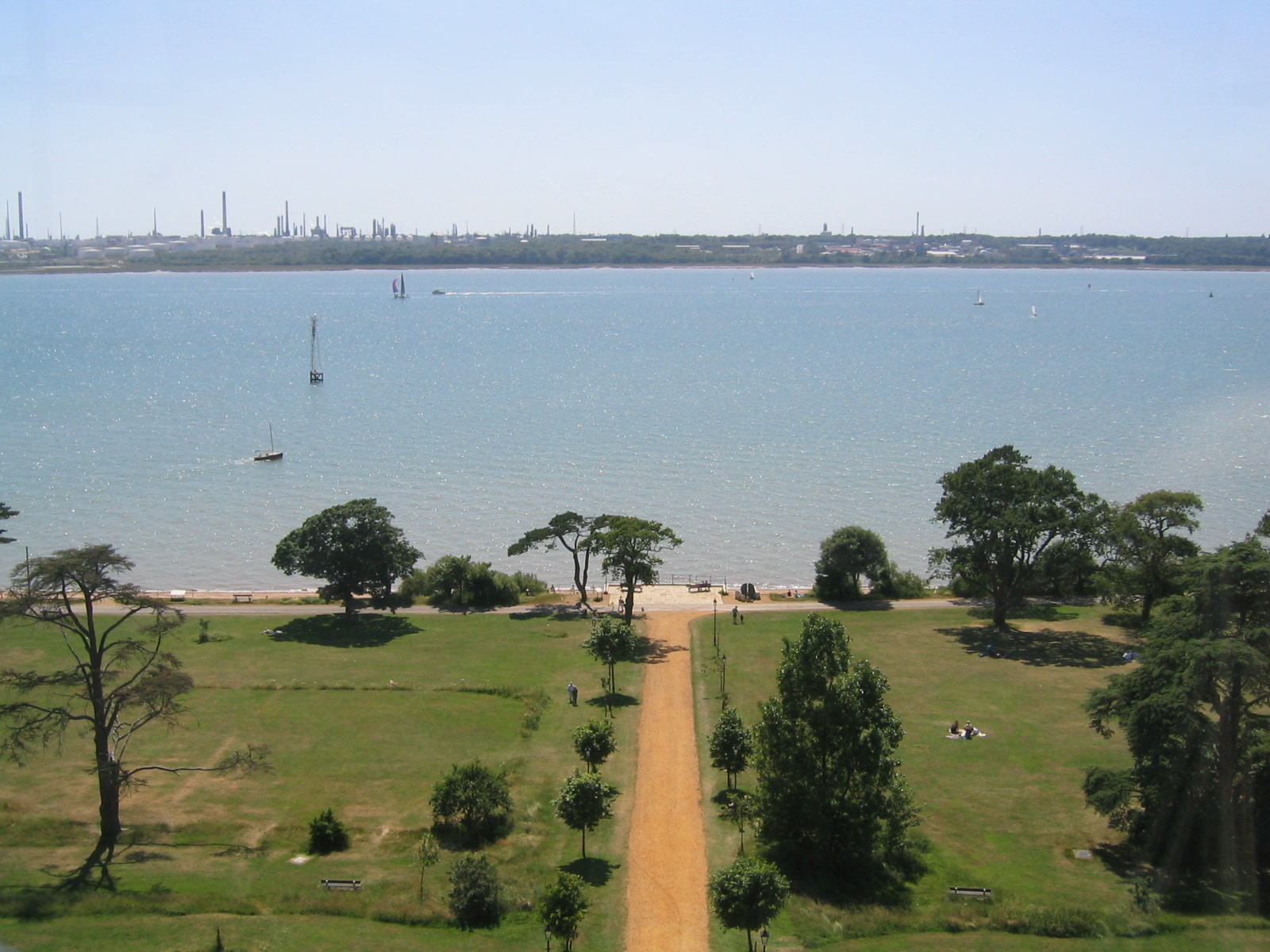
- The Solent Way passing through Royal Victoria Country Park
- Length: 60 mi (97 km)
- Location: Hampshire, England
- Trailheads: Milford on Sea; Emsworth
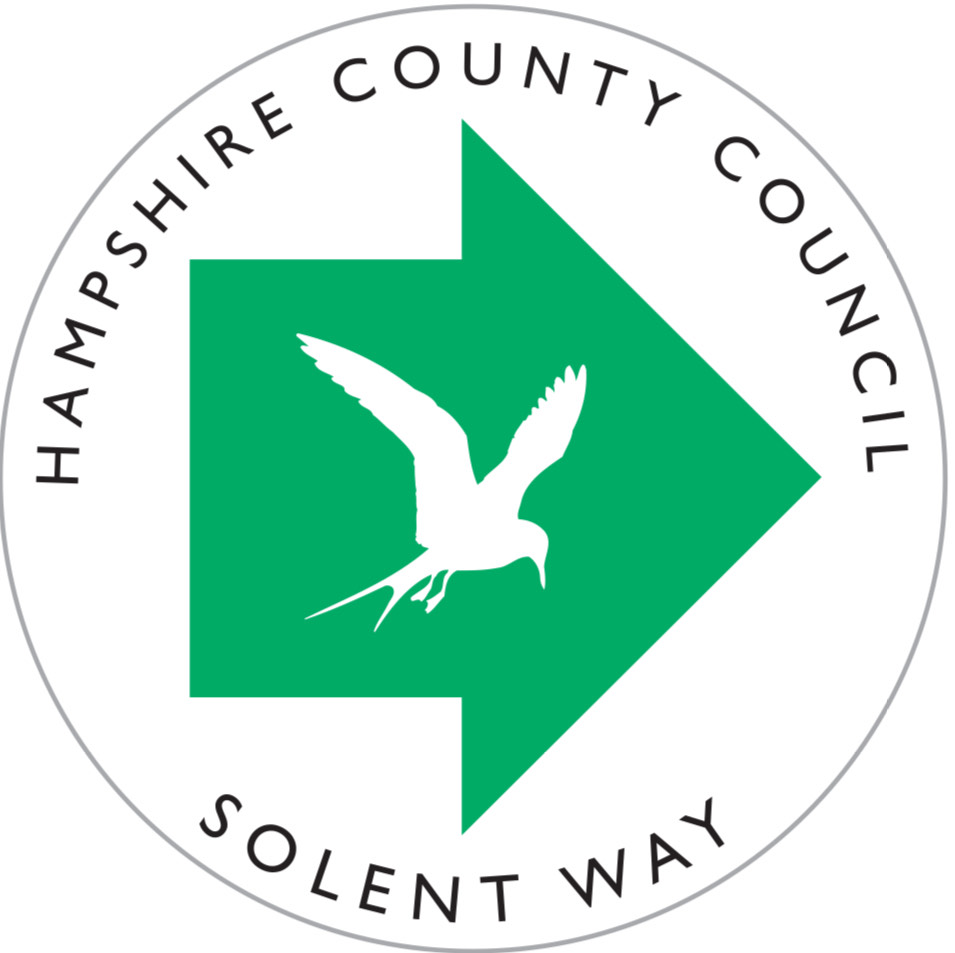
- Waymark
- Website: Official website

Trail map
- The route of the Solent Way.

The Solent Way is a long-distance footpath in Hampshire, southern England. For the most part, the path follows the coast of the Solent, the sea strait that separates mainland Britain from the Isle of Wight. The Solent Way forms part of the King Charles III England Coast Path, as well as part of the E9 European Coastal Path, which runs for 5000 km (3125 miles) from Cape St Vincent in Portugal to Narva-Jõesuu in Estonia.

The way is marked by circular discs bearing a green arrow and a picture of a tern. These are attached to wooden posts and street furniture along the route.

== Route ==
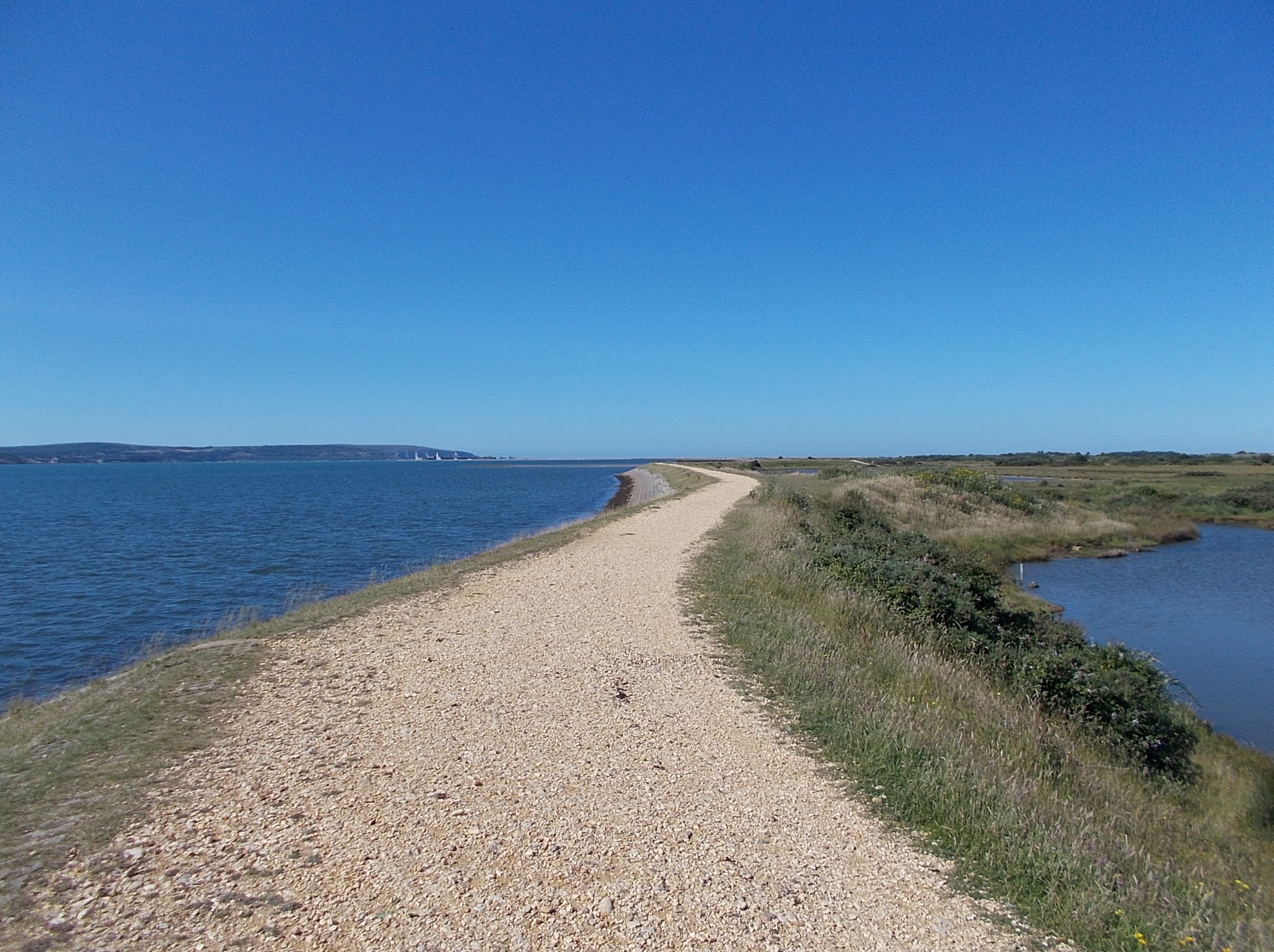
Solent Way between Lymington and Keyhaven

The Solent Way starts in the seaside resort of Milford on Sea, where it connects with the Bournemouth Coast Path. It then follows the coastline and the shingle spit to the fortifications of Hurst Castle. From Hurst Castle there are two alternative routes, one involving retracing steps along the shingle spit (Hurst Spit), the other catching the seasonal ferry to Keyhaven. From Keyhaven the route follows the marshes and former saltings to the port and sailing centre of Lymington.

From Lymington the Solent Way crosses the Lymington River then continues a mile or so inland of the coast, giving occasional glimpses to the busy Solent to the south-east. Soon the path enters the New Forest, passing Sowley Pond before reaching Buckler's Hard on the Beaulieu River. From Buckler's Hard the path follows the edge of the river to Beaulieu and on to Hythe on the west bank of Southampton Water. From Hythe the path takes the Hythe Ferry across Southampton Water to the Town Quay in the centre of the port city of Southampton.

From Southampton the Solent Way passes through the city centre, crosses the River Itchen by the high-level Itchen Bridge and follows the northern shore of Southampton Water past Netley Castle, the ruins of Netley Abbey, and the Royal Victoria Country Park to the yachting centre of Hamble-le-Rice. Here it crosses the River Hamble on the small pedestrian Hamble-Warsash Ferry to the village of Warsash.

From Warsash, the north shore of the Solent is regained, and followed past Titchfield Haven National Nature Reserve and through the seaside centres of Hill Head and Lee-on-Solent to the town of Gosport on the western side of Portsmouth Harbour. Here the Gosport Ferry is used to cross Portsmouth Harbour to Portsmouth Harbour railway station in the centre of the naval city of Portsmouth.

The Solent Way then follows the seaside promenade through the resort of Southsea, and along the western and northern shores of Langstone Harbour past Farlington Marshes Nature Reserve to the village of Langstone. From Langstone the path follows the north coast of Chichester Harbour and passes Warblington Castle before reaching its end at the village of Emsworth.

== See also ==
- Long-distance footpaths in the UK
- England Coast Path
- Isle of Wight Coastal Path
- Test Way
