= Williams Shipping =

Marine services company in England

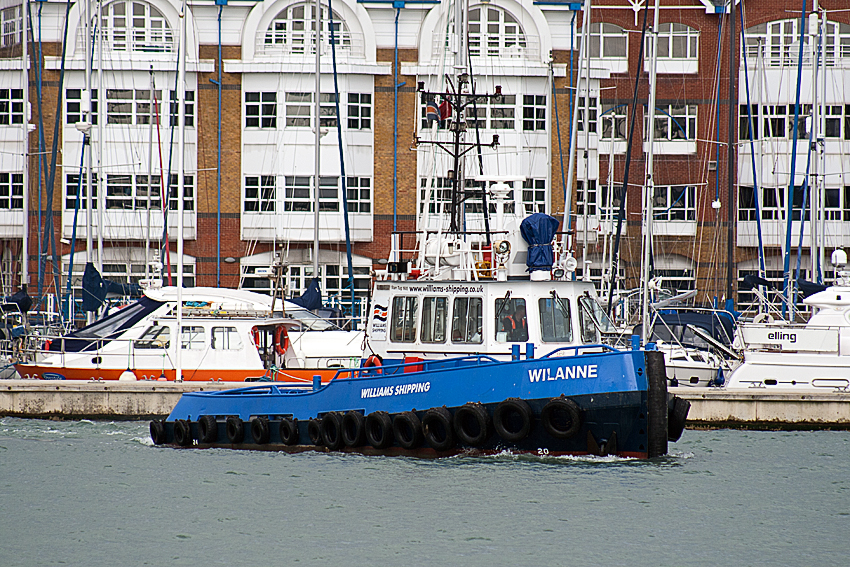
- Wilanne, Williams Shipping tug/workboat
- Trade name: Williams Shipping Marine Ltd; Williams Shipping Transport Ltd
- Company type: Private Limited Company
- Industry: Marine
- Founded: 1894
- Founder: George Williams
- Headquarters: Southampton, United Kingdom
- Number of locations: 3
- Services: Abnormal loads; Cargo Handling; Logistics; Marine lubricants; Marine support; Road Transport; Shipping containers; Vessel charter
- Number of employees: 100
- Website: williams-shipping.co.uk

Williams Shipping is a marine services & logistics company based in Southampton, England. Its services include vessel chartering, marine operation services, oil spill response, road transport, marine lubricants and container hire.

== History ==
George Williams founded the company in 1894, after a career working on windjammers.

== Marine Fleet ==
Vessel Name	Vessel Type	Length / Breadth
Willendeavour	Multicat	22 m × 9 m (72 ft × 30 ft)
Willsupply	Multicat	20 m × 7 m (66 ft × 23 ft)
Wiljive	Multicat	15.5 m × 6 m (51 ft × 20 ft)
Wiltango	Multicat	15.5 m × 6 m (51 ft × 20 ft)
Willdart	Workboat	14.5 m × 4.9 m (48 ft × 16 ft)
Wilcat	Multicat	14 m × 6 m (46 ft × 20 ft)
Willpower	Tugs & Workboats	22.5 m × 7.25 m (73.8 ft × 23.8 ft)
Wilanne	Tugs & Workboats	16.9 m × 5.3 m (55 ft × 17 ft)
Lilah	Tugs & Workboats	16 m × 5 m (52 ft × 16 ft)
Wilventure II	Fast launch	13.9 m × 4.3 m (46 ft × 14 ft)
Willfetch	Fast launch	11.7 m × 4 m (38 ft × 13 ft)
Wiljay	Tugs & Workboats	11.1 m × 3 m (36.4 ft × 9.8 ft)
Wilwren	Tugs & Workboats	9.2 m × 3 m (30.2 ft × 9.8 ft)
Wilcarry 1750	Pontoons & Barges	45 m × 20 m (148 ft × 66 ft)
Wilcarry 1711	Pontoons & Barges	50 m × 18.8 m (164 ft × 62 ft)
Wilcarry 1717	Pontoons & Barges	50 m × 18.8 m (164 ft × 62 ft)
Wilcarry 1500	Pontoons & Barges	50 m × 14 m (164 ft × 46 ft)
Wilcarry 504	Pontoons & Barges	30 m × 11.2 m (98 ft × 37 ft)
Wilcarry 503	Pontoons & Barges	30 m × 11.2 m (98 ft × 37 ft)
Wilcarry 501	Pontoons & Barges	30 m × 11.2 m (98 ft × 37 ft)
Wilcarry 350	Pontoons & Barges	33.2 m × 9.8 m (109 ft × 32 ft)
Wilcarry 312	Pontoons & Barges	33.6 m × 8.1 m (110 ft × 27 ft)
Wilcarry 300	Pontoons & Barges	36 m × 8 m (118 ft × 26 ft)
Wilcarry 250	Pontoons & Barges	45.1 m × 8 m (148 ft × 26 ft)
Wilcarry 100	Pontoons & Barges	14 m × 8 m (46 ft × 26 ft)
Wilcarry 22	Pontoons & Barges	12.7 m × 5 m (42 ft × 16 ft)
Blade Runner Two	Shallow water barge	75 m × 9.5 m (246 ft × 31 ft)

== Transport fleet ==
In 2014, the company acquired a 100 tonne crawler crane with a boom of 42 metres.

In 2015 the company expanded its transport fleet with Euro-6 DAF XF tractor units to furnish its specialist logistics and general haulage operations. The trucks include three XF 510 FTG Super Space Cabs plated at 65-tonnes, two 44-tonne XF 460 FTG Space Cabs and an XF 460 FTR Space Cab with 47 tonne Hiab Crane.

In 2016 the company purchased a Hyster reach stacker and developed a 1-acre area of its Millbrook site into a cargo handling yard.

== Locations ==
The company has offices in the Eastern Docks and Millbrook areas of Southampton, in Aberdeen and in Pembrokeshire. Its office in Pembroke Port opened in 2004 as part of a joint venture with Milford Haven Port Authority.
