= Grace Dieu (ship) =

1418 English warship, destroyed by fire in 1439

Coordinates: 50.891665°N 1.28848°W

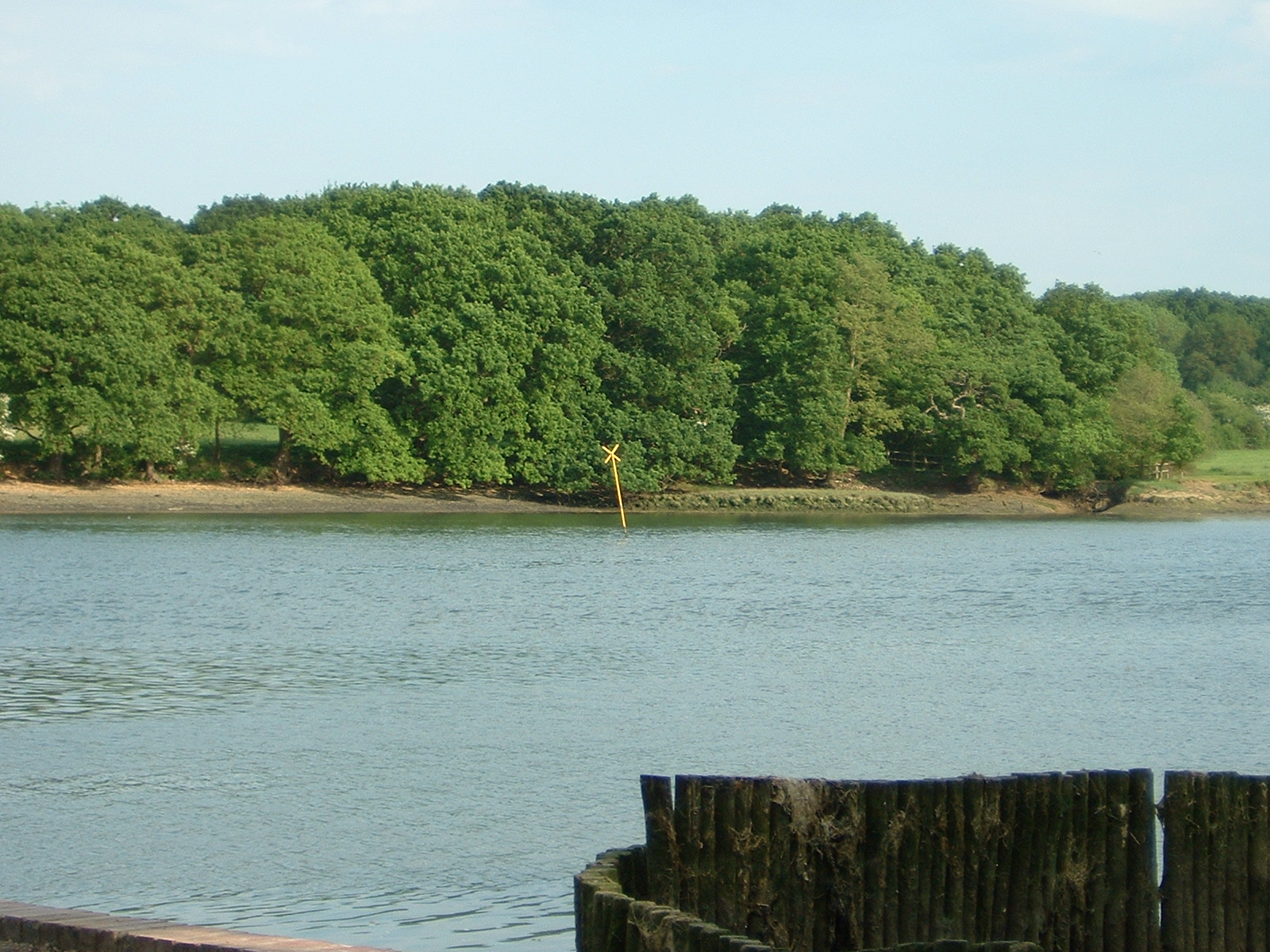
- The yellow hazard marker is sited on the wreck of Grace Dieu in the River Hamble

History

England
- Name: Grace Dieu
- Ordered: 1416
- Builder: William Soper
- Launched: 1418
- Commissioned: 1420
- In service: 1420–1439
- Fate: Struck by lightning and burnt in 1439

General characteristics
- Displacement: 1,400–2,750 tons
- Length: 218 ft (66.45 m)
- Beam: 50 ft (15.24 m)
- Complement: 250
- Armament: 3 cannon; Archers

Grace Dieu was the flagship of King Henry V of England and one of the largest ships of her time. Launched in 1418, she sailed on only one voyage and was subsequently laid up at anchor in the River Hamble. She burned in 1439 after being struck by lightning. The wreck is a Protected Wreck managed by Historic England.

== Design and construction ==
Grace Dieu was built to a design proposed by William Soper, a burgess of Southampton and Clerk of the King's Ships. She was clinker-built with three planks nailed together along each part of her hull and waterproofed with tar and moss sandwiched between the timbers. As constructed she was 218 ft (66.45 m) long with a 50 ft (15.24 m) beam, comparable in size with HMS Victory and twice as large as Mary Rose. Estimates of her weight range between 1,400 tons and 2,750 tons. Two smaller ships, Valentine and Falcon, were built to escort her. A dock was specially built for her construction near Town Quay in Southampton.

The remains of Grace Dieu suggest that she was built in a hurry, with some of the planks and ribs left only roughly finished. She was a vast ship requiring 2,735 oak, 1,145 beech, and 14 ash trees for her timbers. When completed in 1418, she was one of the largest wooden ships of her time. Humphrey, Duke of Gloucester, regarded her as "the fairest [vessel] that ever man saw," while the Florentine Captain of the Galleys, Luca di Masa degli Albizzi, remarked that despite his lifetime at sea he had never seen "so large and beautiful a construction".

Grace Dieu was designed for use in battle against Genoa's formidable fleet of carracks, that city being at the time the ally of France and enemy of England. To this end she was built with high sides and a prow that rose more than 50 ft (15.24 m), so that her archers could shoot from above into the much lower carracks that she would run alongside. However, by the time she was completed England had firm control over the Channel and was at peace with France following the Treaty of Troyes.

== 1420 voyage ==
Grace Dieu and her escorts appear to have only set sail once, in 1420, under the command of the Earl of Devon and with orders to make a cruise down the English Channel. The expedition suffered a mutiny even before leaving port, when the crew objected to the presence of a contingent of soldiers and archers brought aboard to guard the vessel. Grace Dieu's sailors attempted to prevent the soldiers from boarding by abusing the clerk who was registering their names and threatening to throw the register into the sea. When the ship finally left port, nine of the crew incited a further mutiny against the captain by refusing to take their stations and insisting that the cruise be abandoned. Grace Dieu was brought into the nearest port, St. Helen's on the Isle of Wight, and the crew departed. A clerk who questioned their loyalty as they departed was assaulted and had his clothing torn.

== Service after Henry V's death and loss ==
When Henry V died in 1422 his ships were treated as his private property rather than as part of the kingdom's navy. Many were sold off to pay his debts.

In 1430 William Soper, by now in charge of the administration of the entire navy, dined with the commander of the Florentine merchant fleet on board Grace Dieu.

Subsequently, Grace Dieu was laid-up in the River Hamble. Already dismasted and stripped of equipment, she was burnt to the waterline after being set ablaze by a bolt of lightning in 1439.

== Rediscovery ==
The remains of Grace Dieu are still in the River Hamble at Bursledon, near Southampton, Hampshire. Until 1933 the wreck was believed to be that of a Danish galley or a nineteenth-century merchant ship, but in that year a proper survey established both the true identity of the wreck, and the great size of the ship. The site was designated under the Protection of Wrecks Act on 5 February 1974. The ship was surveyed and partially excavated by the National Maritime Museum in the 1980s and more recently by the University of Southampton's Centre for Maritime Archaeology. In 2004 this work was filmed for Channel 4's archaeology programme Time Team (2005: Series 12 Episode 6)). 50 metres from the remains lie those of another vessel, believed to be Grace Dieu's contemporary Holigost.

== See also ==
- List of world's largest wooden ships
- Great Harry — Henry VIII's flagship 1514; The Henry Grace à Dieu ("Henry Grace of God").
- Peter von Danzig
- Baochuan

== Bibliography ==
- Wilson, Ben (2013). Empire of the Deep; The Rise and Fall of the British Navy. Weidenfeld & Nicolson. ISBN 0297864084.
- Lavery, Brian (2010). Royal Tars: The Lower Deck of the Royal Navy 875-1850. Naval Institute Press. ISBN 9781591147435.
- R C Anderson, The Bursledon Ship, Mariner's Mirror, Vol 20, No.2, 1934.
- M W Prynne, Henry V's Grace Dieu, Mariner's Mirror, Vol 54, No.2, 1968.
- N A M Rodger, The Safeguard of the Sea, A Naval History of Britain 660-1649 (London 1997).
- S Rose, Henry V's Grace Dieu and Mutiny at Sea: Some new evidence, Mariner's Mirror, Vol 63, No.1, 1977.
- B Wilson, Empire of the Deep; The Rise and Fall of the British Navy, Weidenfeld & Nicolson, 2013
