= River Hamble =

River in south Hampshire, England

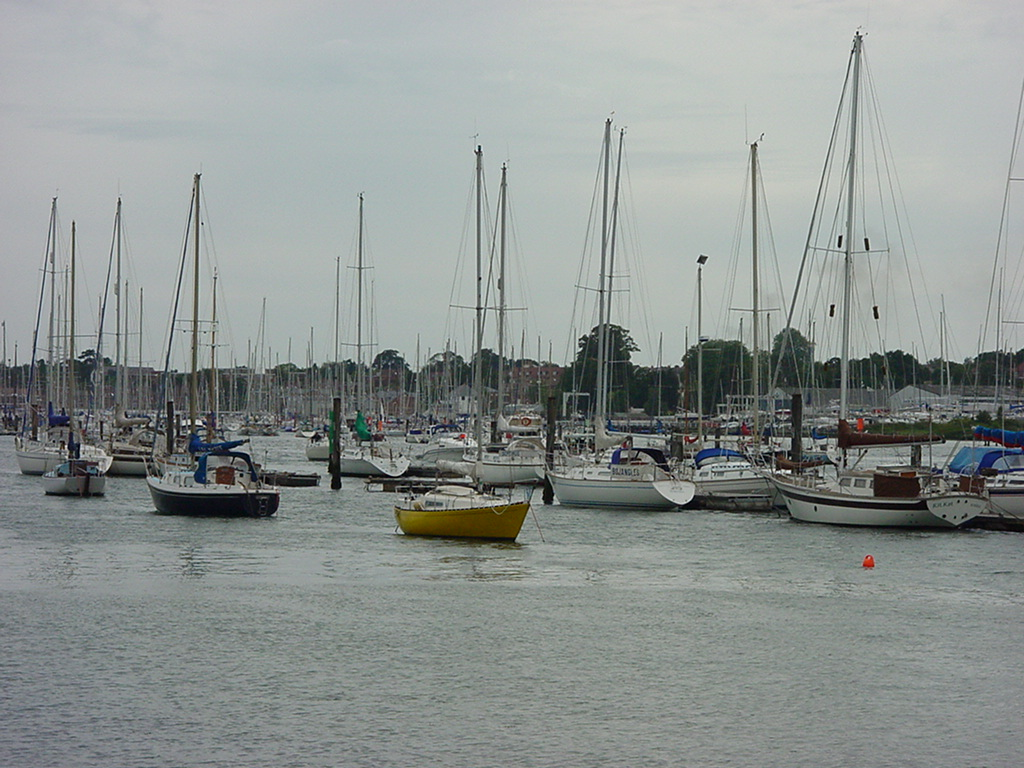
- Yachts on the Hamble

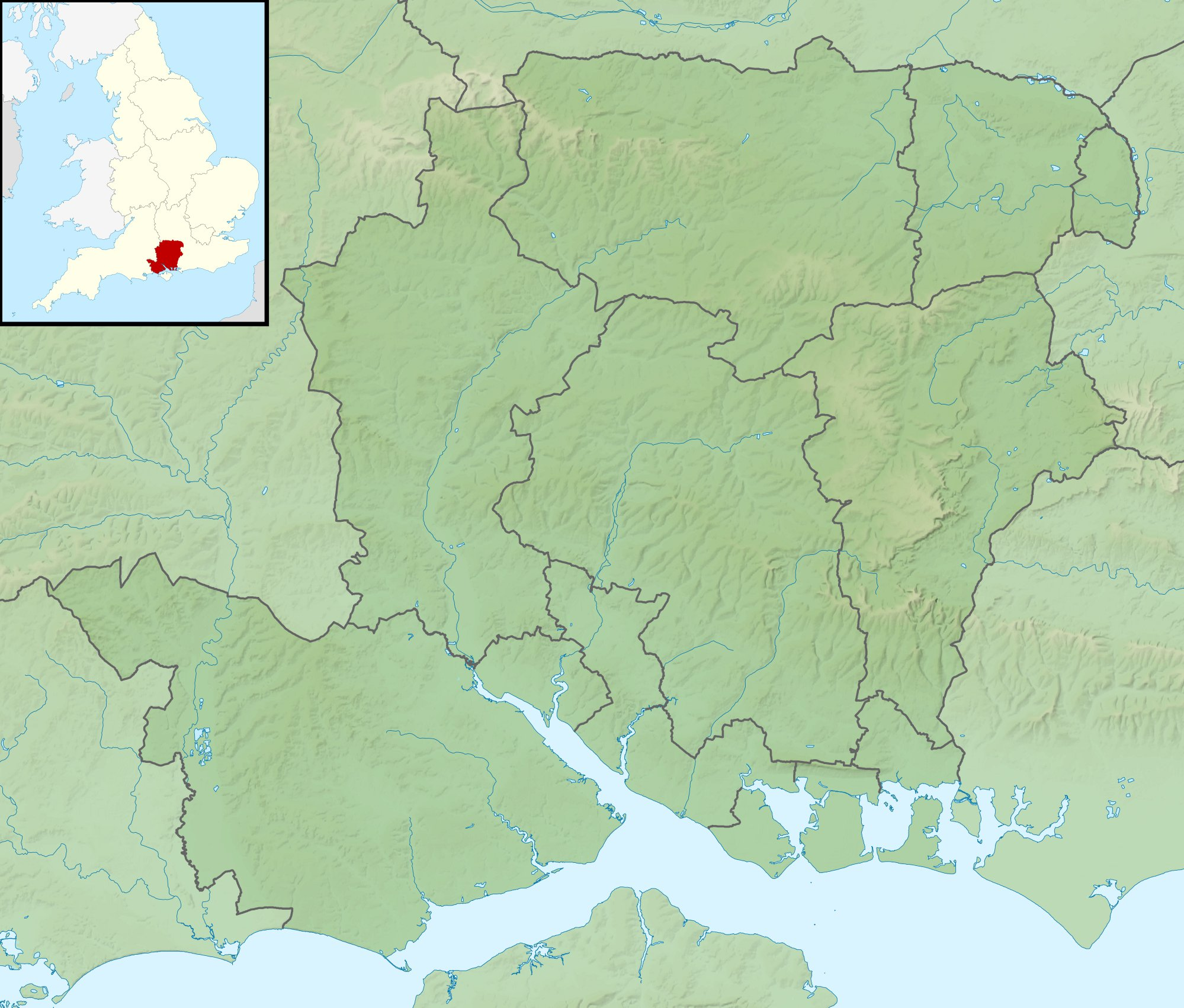

Location
- Country: England
- County: Hampshire
- Settlements: Bishops Waltham, Botley, Bursledon, Hamble, Warsash

Physical characteristics
- Source
  - location: Bishops Waltham, Hampshire.
  - coordinates: 50°57′15″N 1°12′56″W
- Mouth
  - location: Southampton Water
  - coordinates: 50°50′30″N 1°18′45″W
- Length: 10.1 km (6.3 mi)

The River Hamble in south Hampshire, England, rises near Bishop's Waltham and flows for 10.1 km (6.3 mi) through Botley, Bursledon, and Lower Swanwick before entering Southampton Water between Hamble Common and Warsash.

The river is tidal for about half its length and is navigable below Botley. From the medieval period to the present it has been a major ship and boat-building area. Leisure craft are still built by the Hamble today. One of the main builders was Luke & Co, later Luke Bros, from around 1890 to its closure in 1945. The lower reaches are a major yachting area with easy access to the sheltered waters of Southampton Water and The Solent.

== Course ==
From source to mouth the river makes a repeated curve heading south-southwest. It gains tributary streams before reaching Botley, the site of an ancient watermill. Below Botley, the river becomes tidal and navigable. It gains strength from adjoining streams, draining surrounding Hedge End, Curdridge, Shedfield, and Burridge.

This section was extensively used for medieval shipbuilding, using timber grown locally in the neighbouring woods. Nearby Kings Copse, a cut-back form of Kings Forest, speaks of this key use of the land.

The river's west bank can be accessed from the River Hamble Country Park, where it is possible to walk through Dock Copse and Fosters Copse. At extreme low tide, it is just possible to see the remains of the wreck of Henry VIII’s 15th century warship Grace Dieu. This section of the river was also home to HMS Cricket, the Royal Marine landing craft crew training base, during World War II.

At 2 miles (3.2 km) south of Botley, the river passes between the villages of Bursledon and Lower Swanwick and is crossed by the M27 motorway, the Portsmouth to Southampton railway line, and the A27 road via large bridges. A further 2 miles (3.2 km) south of Bursledon, the river flows between the villages of Hamble-le-Rice and Warsash before entering Southampton Water.

A passenger ferry crosses the river between Hamble-le-Rice and Warsash, forming a link for the Solent Way and E9 European Coastal Path. This section of the river is dominated by a number of marinas, the largest being the Port Hamble Marina, and boat yards on both banks as far upstream as Bursledon. On the east bank, south of Warsash, is the Warsash Maritime School, part of Solent University, which provides training for merchant navy crew.

== Lifeboat ==
The Hamble and nearby Solent are patrolled by Hamble Lifeboat, an independent voluntary rescue service based in Hamble-le-Rice.

== Water quality ==
The Environment Agency measure water quality of the river systems in England. Each is given an overall ecological status, which may be one of five levels: high, good, moderate, poor and bad. There are several components that are used to determine this, including biological status, which looks at the quantity and varieties of invertebrates, angiosperms and fish. Chemical status, which compares the concentrations of various chemicals against known safe concentrations, is rated good or fail.

Water quality of the River Hamble in 2019:

Section	Ecological Status	Chemical Status	Overall Status	Length	Catchment	Channel
Upper Hamble	Moderate	Fail	Moderate	5.309 km (3.299 mi)	38.062 km^{2} (14.696 sq mi)	
Main River Hamble	Moderate	Fail	Moderate	4.823 km (2.997 mi)	7.176 km^{2} (2.771 sq mi)	

In the 1970s and 80s the many yachts using the river polluted the water by leaching tributyltin from their anti-fouling paints. By 1988 it had the highest known level in the UK. With its banning for use by vessels under 25 m (82 ft) long, the general concentration in the tidal waters declined to a level that is considered harmless.

== Gallery ==
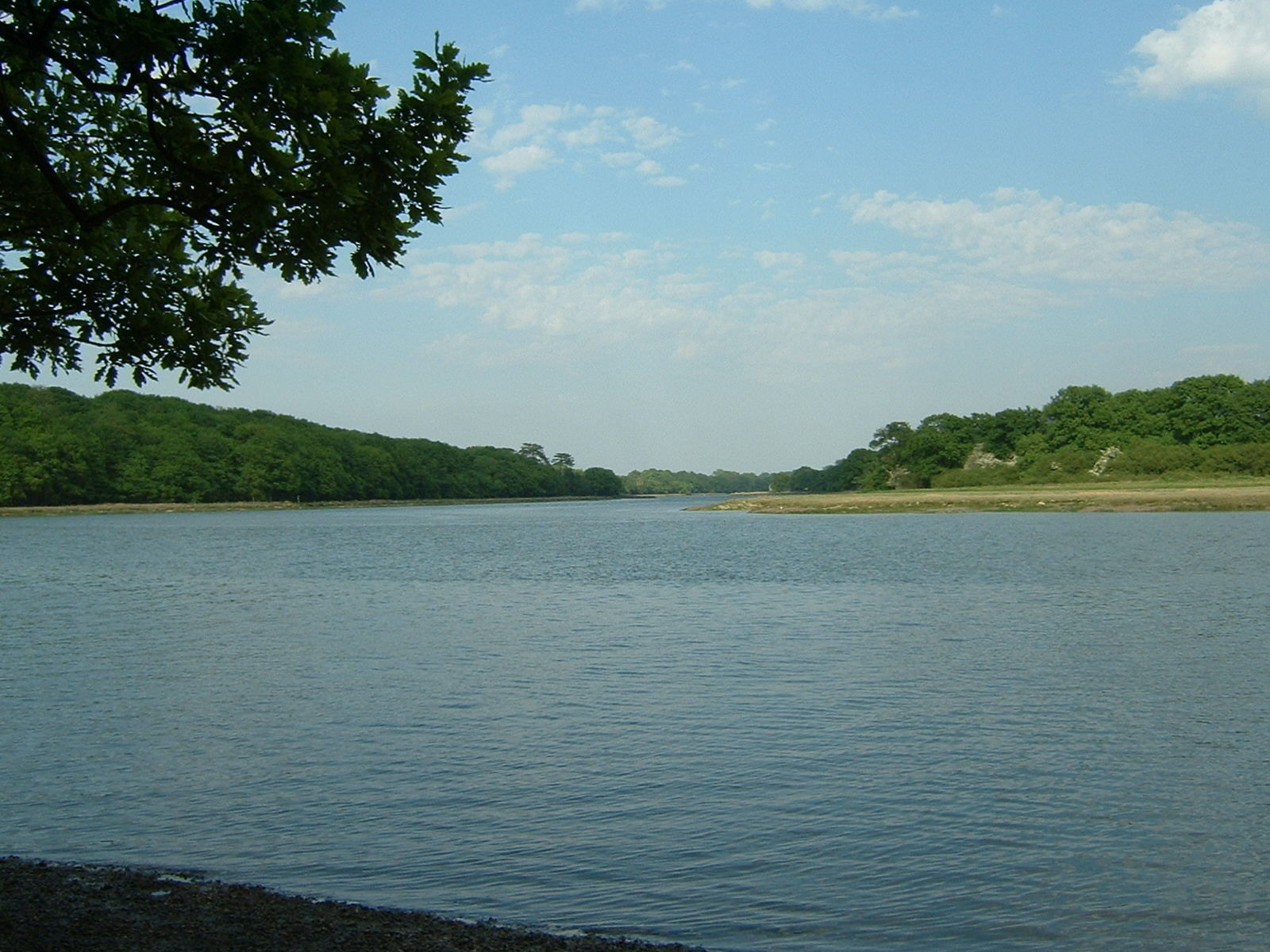
The River Hamble looking upstream towards Botley from Fosters Copse. Dock Copse can be seen on the left bank. Bloomfield Copse is on the right bank

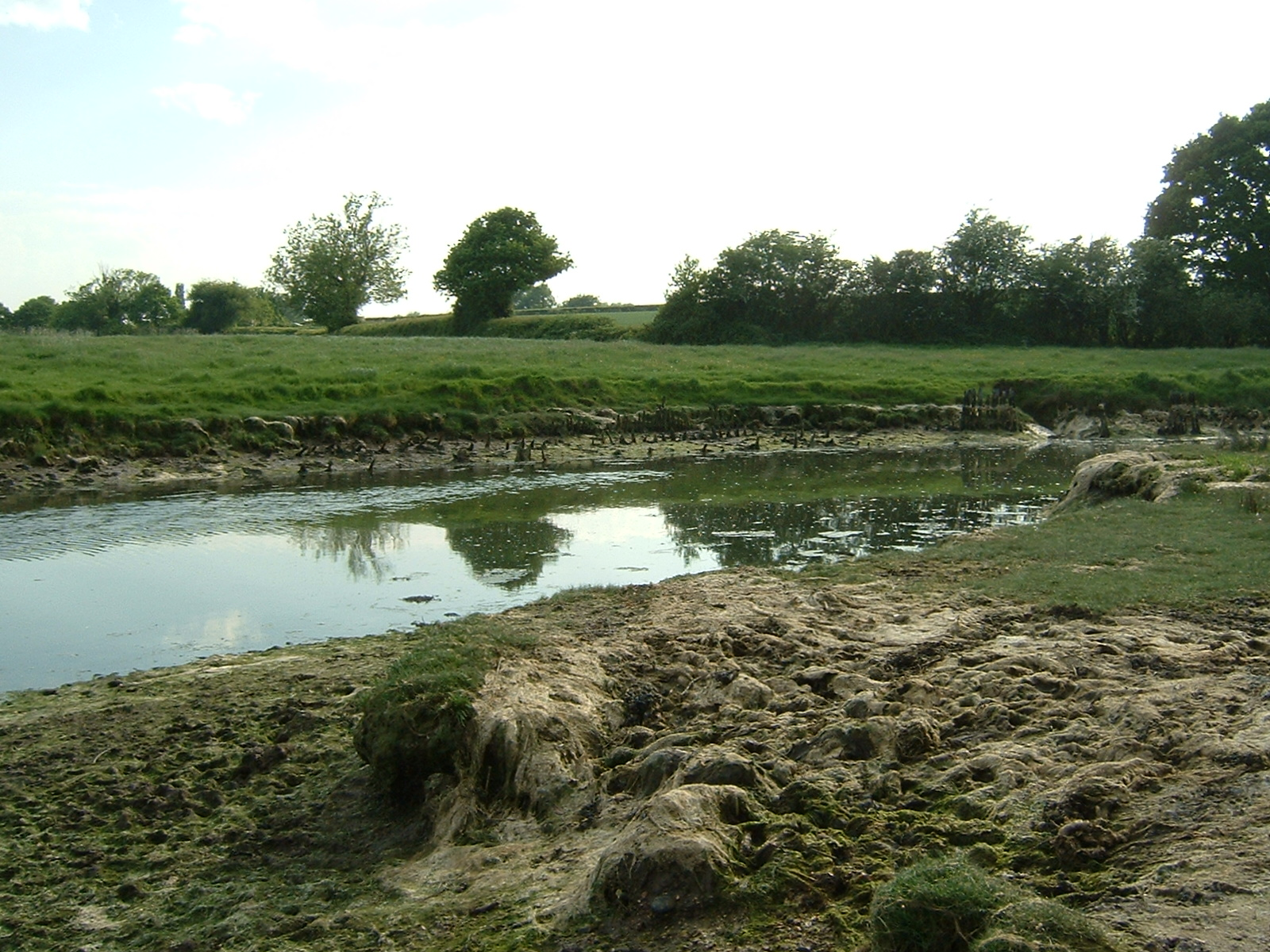
Medieval shipbuilding site on the River Hamble

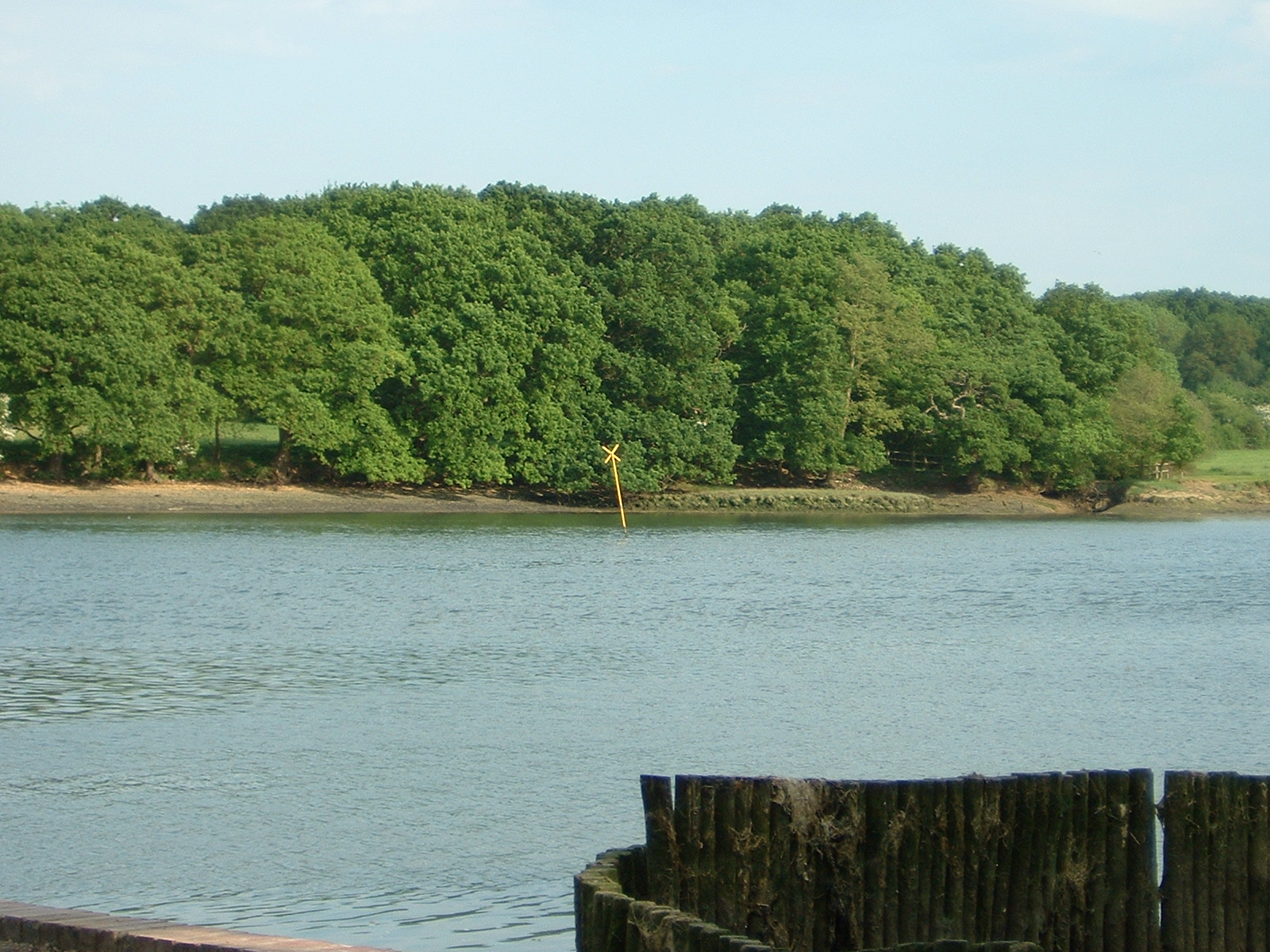
The Yellow X marks the site of the wreck of HMS Grace Dieu

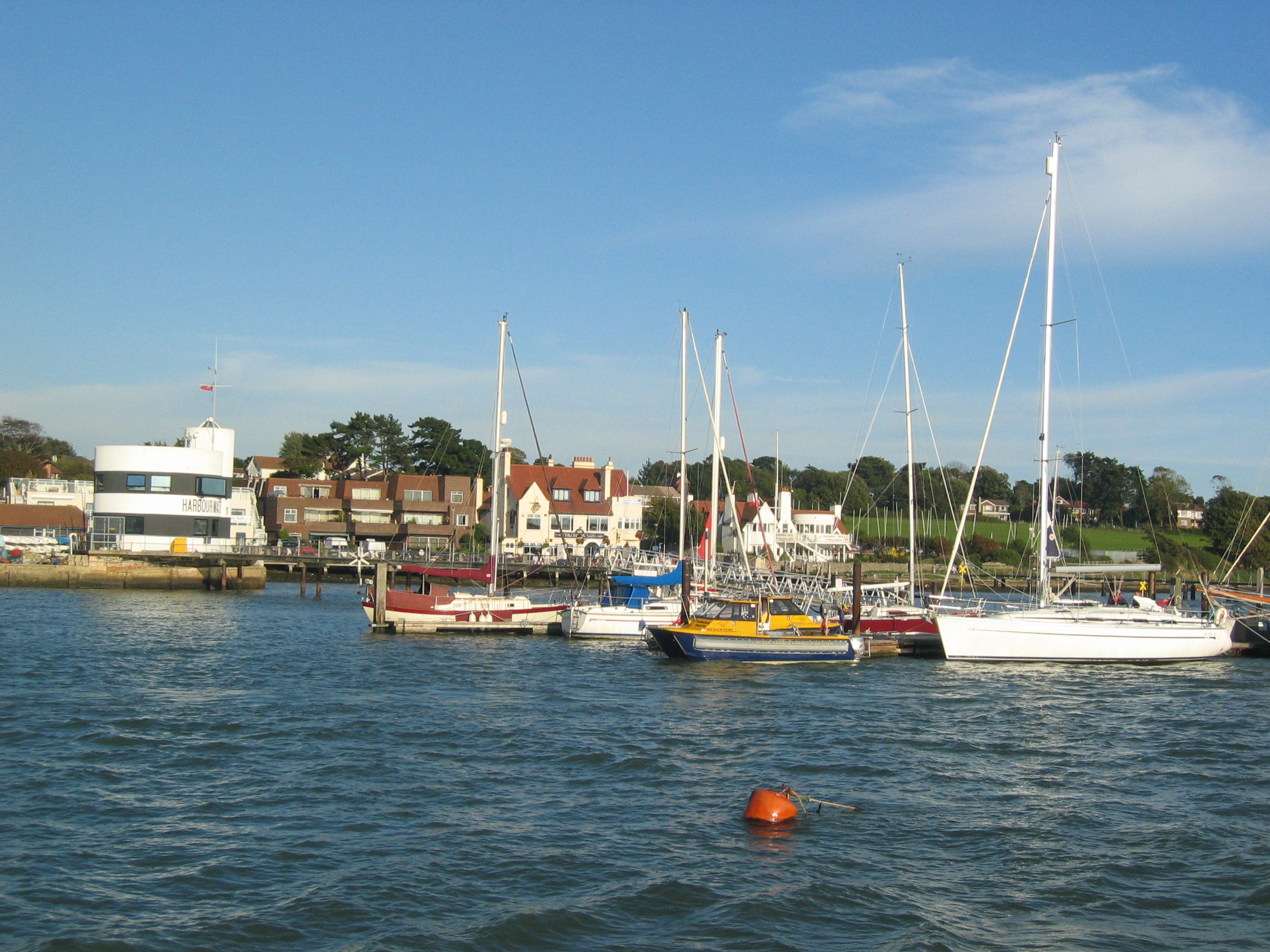
River Hamble Estuary

== See also ==
- Rivers of the United Kingdom
