= Luke & Co =

Boatbuilding firm in England

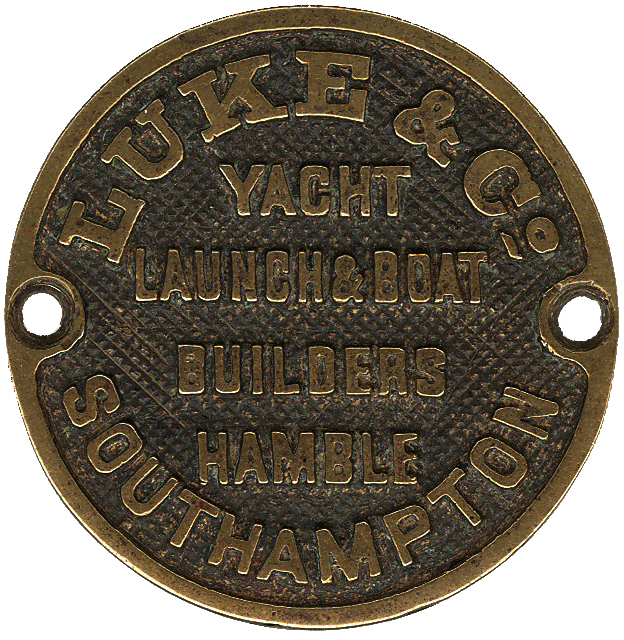
Builders plate 1906

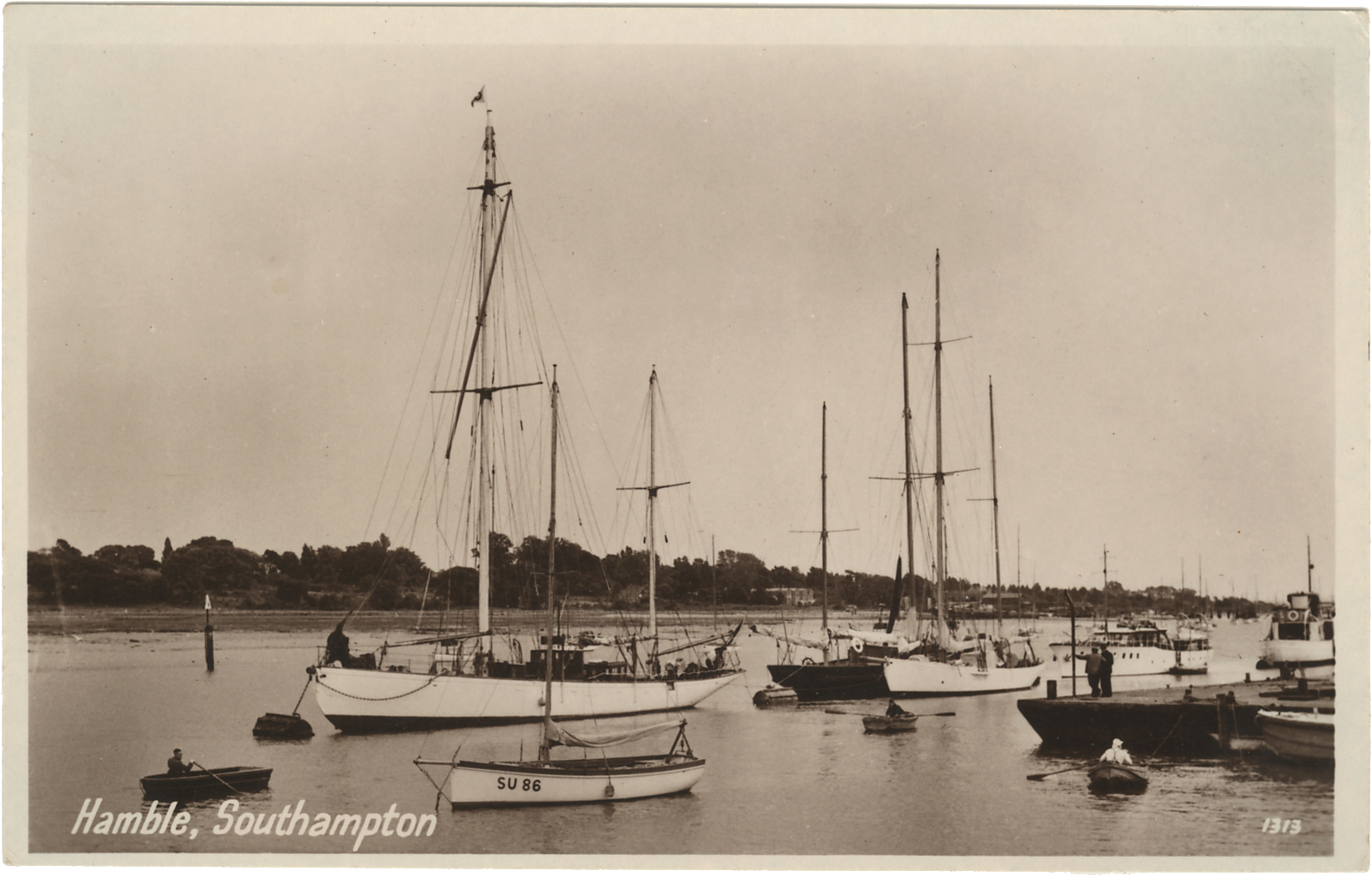
Luke's moorings

Luke & Co was a boatbuilding firm, established in 1829 in Limehouse near London. They moved to Oakbank at Itchen Ferry in 1868, and in 1895, settled at Hamble. At Hamble, they designed and built yachts of all sizes, as well as providing all kinds of services to the yachts visiting or having a berth at the river. The river Hamble was a popular place to "lay up" yachts for the winter.

== Early days ==
There are at least three members of the Luke family known as boatbuilders: W. S. (Walter Smith) Luke (1844–1904), and his sons Walter G. Luke (born 1868) and Albert R. Luke (born 1875). The name of the yard changed over the years from W. S. Luke to W. G. Luke & Co (1895), to Hamble River Luke & Co. Ltd., and finally Luke Bros.

When W. S. Luke died in March 1904, his sons took over the yard: Albert ("Bert") as designer, and Walter managing the boatyard.

In their early days they built Itchen Ferrys, Fishing Smacks, Pilot boats and other sorts of working boats, like a 75-foot Lifeship to a design by Capt. Hans Busk in 1873. But there were also yachts built as early as the 1870s. In 1895, the yard moved from the river Itchen to the village of Hamble at the river of the same name, near Southampton. The former Itchen Yard then became known as Fields Yard. According to an advertisement in an 1891 edition of The Yachtsman, they had "Yachts for sale or hire, Spars, blocks, Anchors, and Galvanised Ironwork either kept in stock or made on the premises, all sorts of chandlery, mudberths". Soon after, they were based at Back Street (now Rope Walk) with building sheds, slipways and yacht stores. Hamble Point became their winter slips.

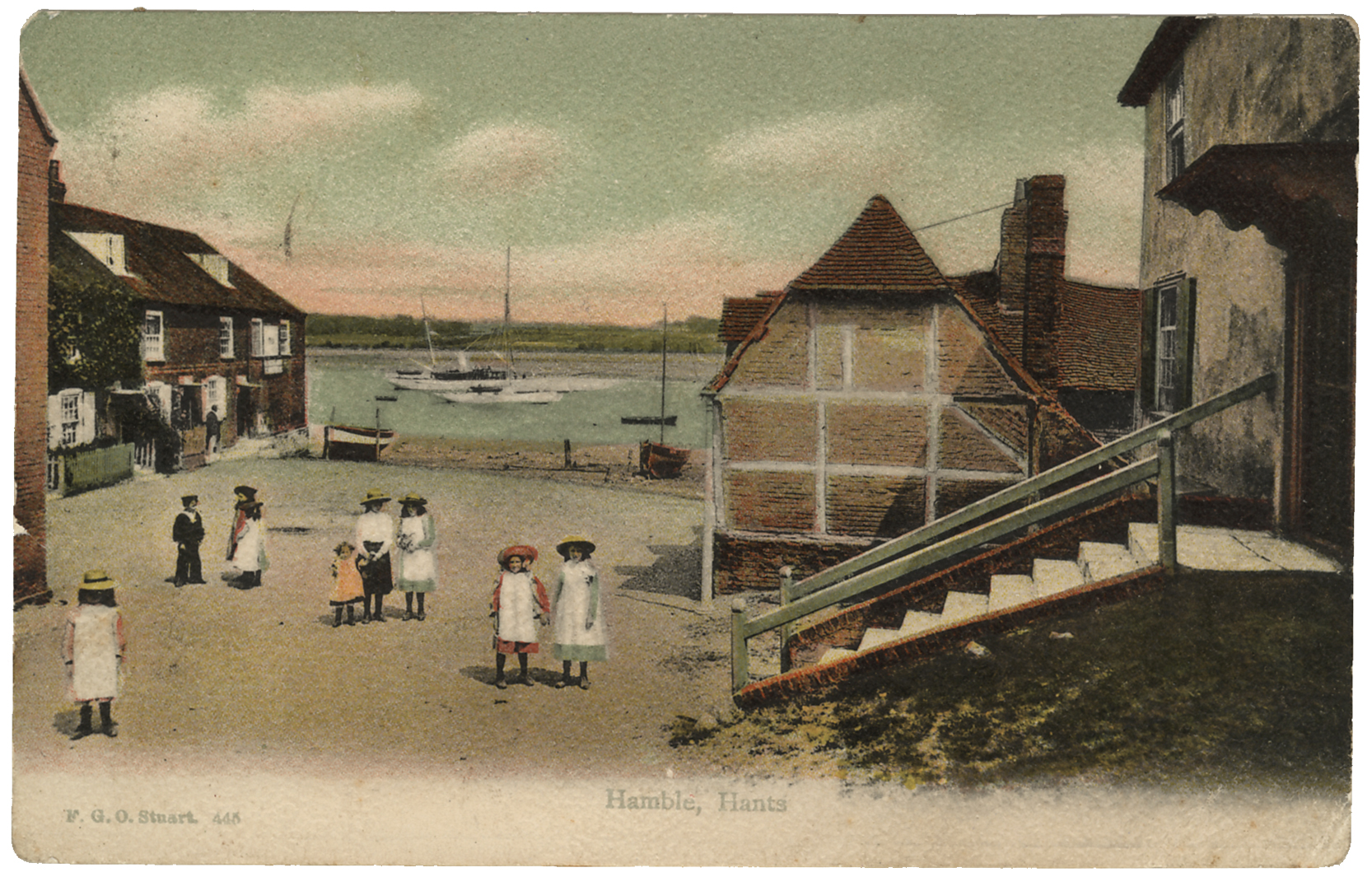
Hamble waterfront

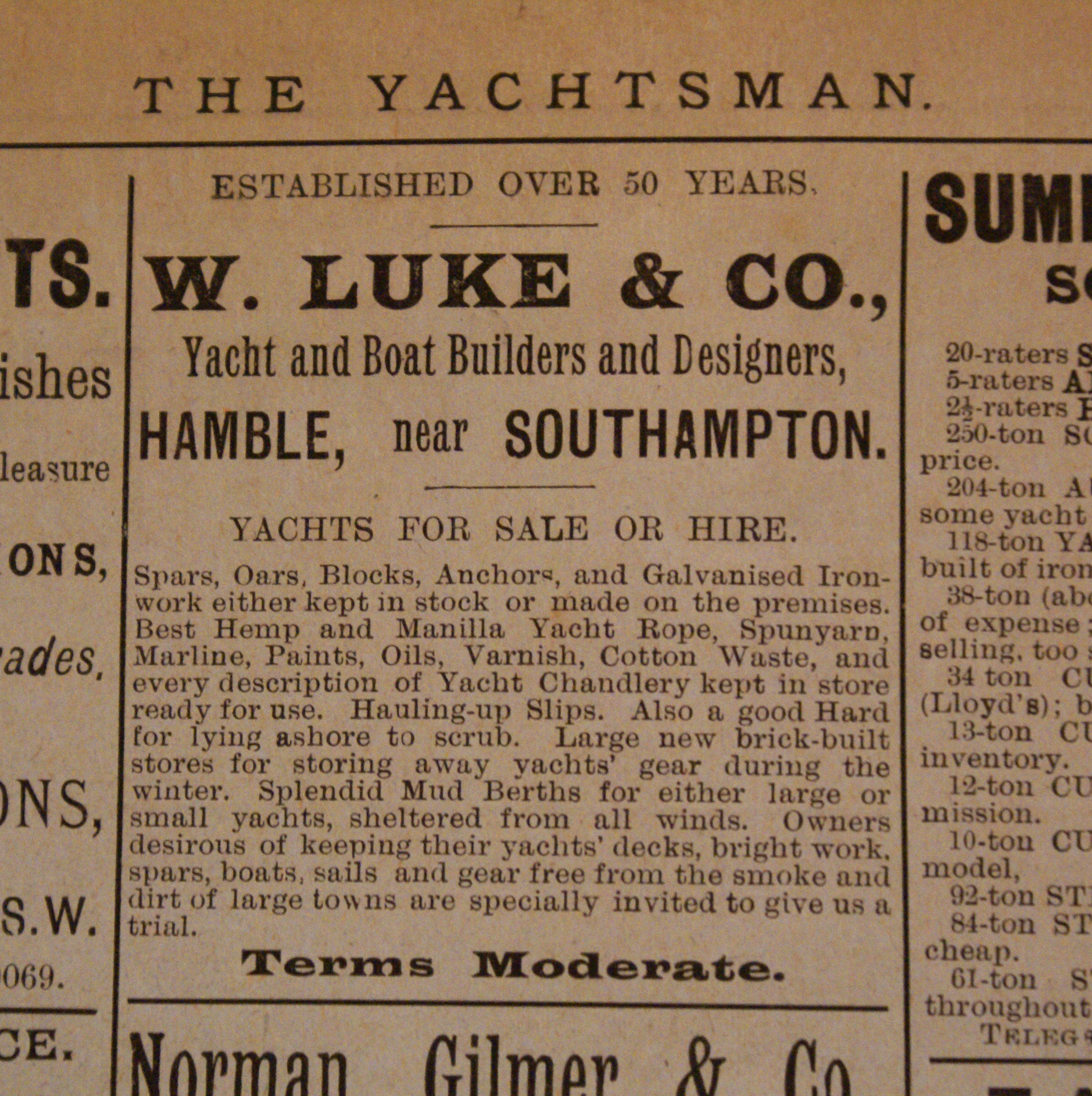
Luke & Co advertisement 1891

Luke mainly built boats to their own design, but they also built boats to the designs of Arthur Payne, F. R. S. Bircham, L. G. Moore, Frederick Shepherd, Albert Strange, St. C. Byrne, John I. Thornycroft & Company, H. Emmons, H. W. Ridsdale and John G. Alden. They also designed ships that were built by others such as William Fife, A. Westmacott, Camper & Nicholson, A. Apps, Randal Vogan, Everett and Lt.Col. G. P. Stewart.

French impressionist painter and amateur yacht designer Gustave Caillebotte writes in November 1882 and May 1883 in the French magazine Le Yacht about his disappointment in the yacht Diver, which he imported from England. She was a Luke-built yacht of extreme "plank on edge" design. Diver was two tons Thames Measurement, 6.71 m (22.0 ft) waterline length and 1.42 m (4 ft 8 in) wide. Plank on edge designs were fashionable at that time in England under the then-current Rating Rules but were generally considered "crank" soon after.

Quaker Girl, an early International Rule 7 meter yacht from 1911, became a successful racing yacht and won A. R. Luke a design award.

In 1913, they built the "Hamble One Design" to their own design for local racing.

== Aviation ==
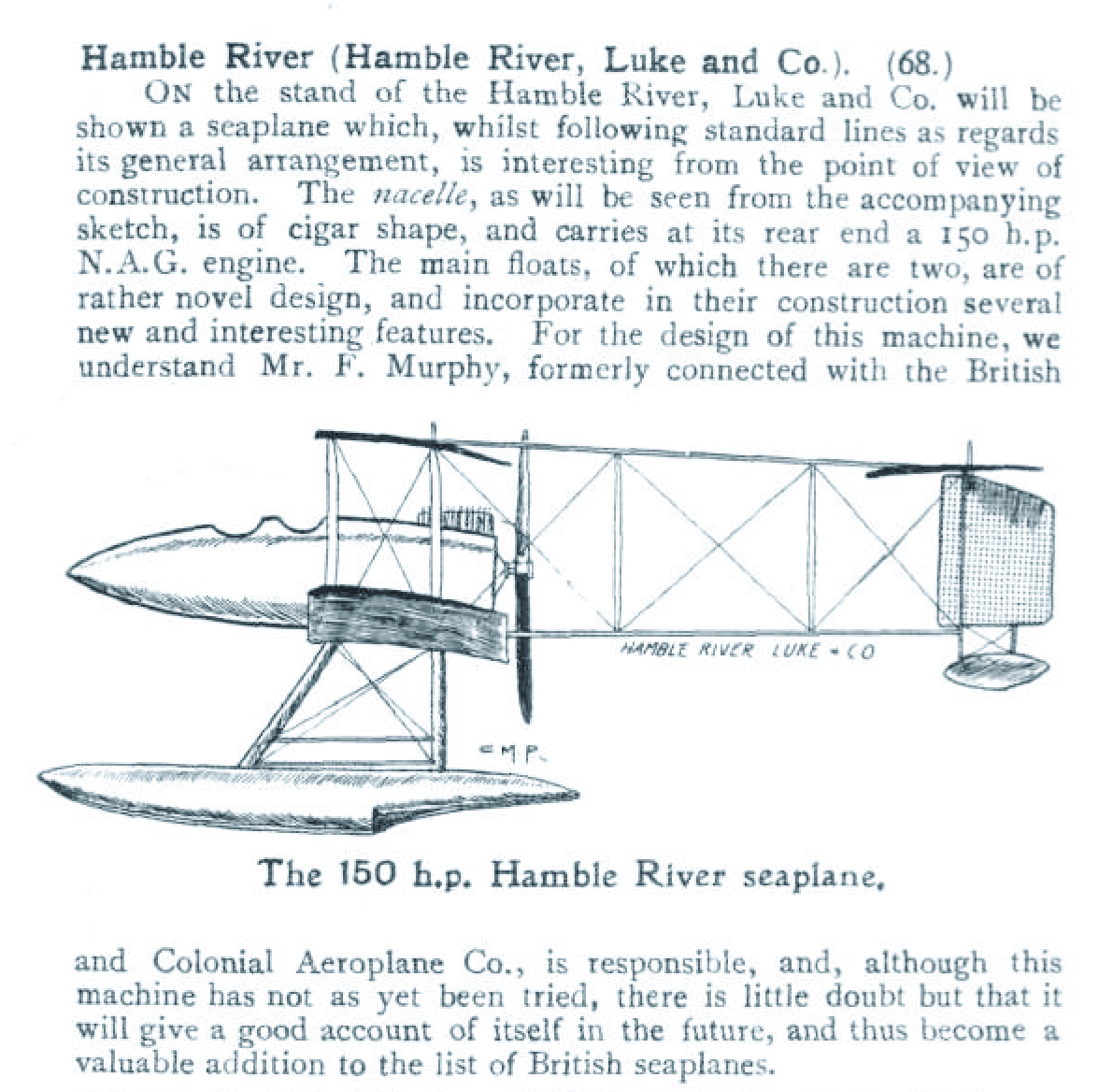
the Hamble seaplane

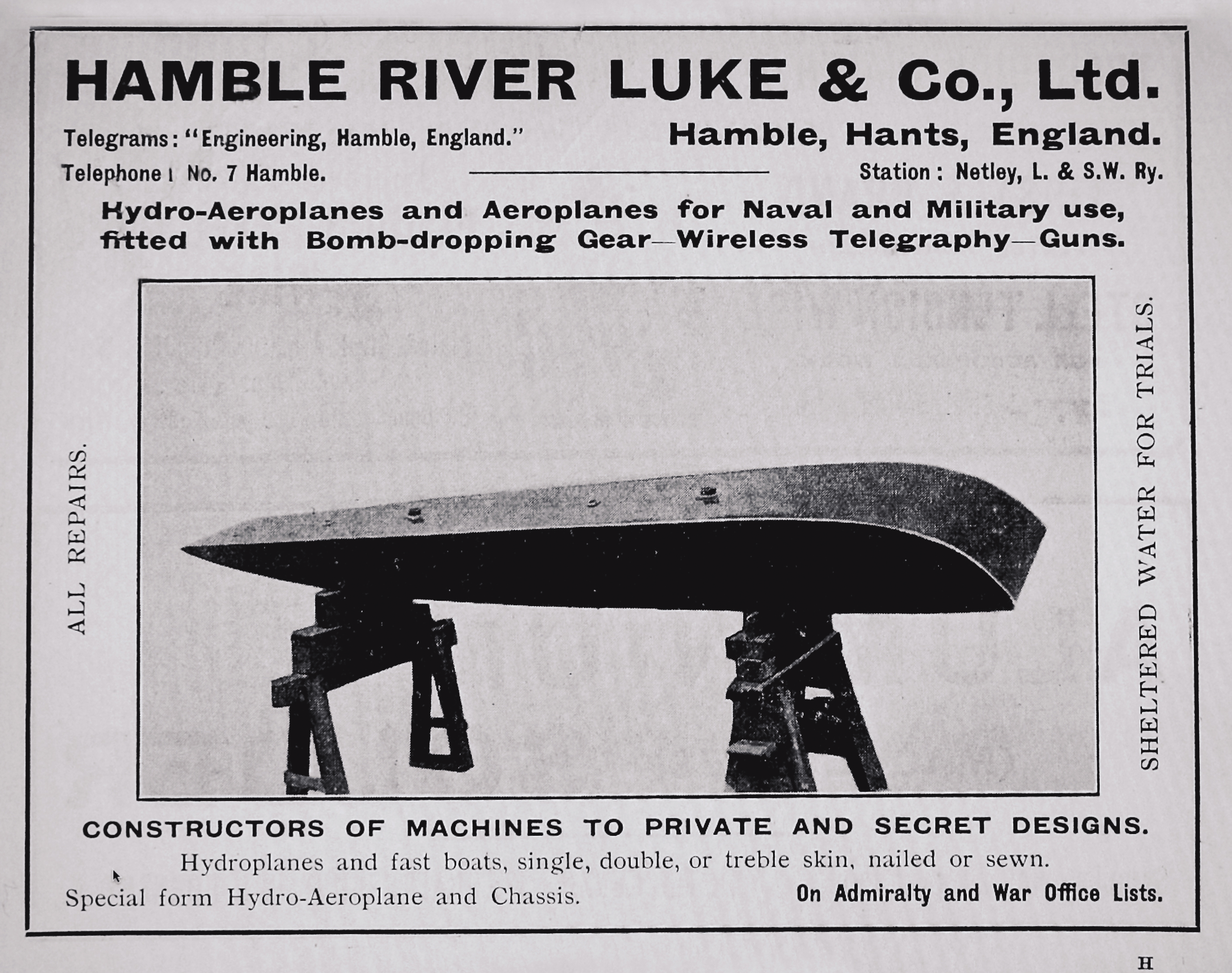
Luke advertisement

Hamble became an aviation centre at around 1910, and Luke built a prototype Seaplane to the design of F. Murphy, the HL1, as "Hamble River, Luke & Co." It was exhibited at Olympia’s in March 1914 but was not a success. At the start of World War I, they started building aircraft components.

They built at least one machine for Sopwith in 1913. It was the Sopwith Bat Boat (Type 1) No.BB2. This machine was assembled at the Salterns Yard of Hamble River, Luke & Co. and was delivered to the Navy at Calshot on 8 June 1913, to meet Contract CP32098/13, placed as a consequence of the 1913 Olympia Show. The aircraft was given Serial No.38 and served until September 1914.

The hydrobiplane (HL1) is described by several authors:

HAMBLE hydrobiplane HL.l (Hamble River, Luke & Co., Hamble, Hampshire)

Constructed by an established boat building company, to the design of Frank Murphy, late of Bristol, the machine was shown incomplete at Olympia in March 1914. Changes were made later and the machine was tested by Gordon England, but costs were excessive, and the machine and the premises were put up for sale by July 1914. The aircraft was a large two-seater pusher seaplane with twin wooden main floats and twin metal tail floats, moving with the rudders. There were four pairs of interplane struts each side, with radiators mounted on the innermost pairs. Ailerons were fitted to both top and bottom wings, the latter having pronounced dihedral. The spruce tail booms, to be replaced by steel tubes later, extended aft from the second interplane struts. The tailplane and elevator were carried on the top booms, the pair of rudders pivoting on posts below. The pointed nose nacelle, was covered with two layers of cedar, laid up diagonally over the structure, and was mounted on short struts between the wings. The main floats were of similar construction, but rendered watertight, and were mounted on a steel tube chassis, intended to be sprung later.

Power: 150hp NAG (British-made) six-cylinder inline, water-cooled driving a Normale pusher propeller direct. Data: Span top 60ft Span bottom 53ft Chord 6ft Gap 6ft Length 30ft Area 678 sq ft Area tailplane 39 sq ft Area elevator 33 sq ft Area rudders 32 sq ft Weight 1,3001b Weight allup 2,550 lb Speed range 32-65mph

Endurance 5hr

Hamble River, Luke H.L.1 The H.L.1 was built by Hamble River, Luke and Co., of Hamble, Hants., and was shown in an unfinished state at the 1914 Olympia Aero Show. It was a two-seat pusher seaplane designed by F. Murphy, who had worked previously as a designer with the British and Colonial Aeroplane Co., at Bristol. The machine featured a finely-finished cigar-shaped nacelle, at the rear of which was mounted a 150 h.p. N.A.G. six-cylinder German-designed and British-built engine, the radiators being fitted to the inter-plane struts on each side of the nacelle. The construction was of wood and fabric, and the wings were equipped with ailerons. The float structure was redesigned while the H.L.1 was being completed, and the machine was test-flown by E. C. Gordon England. Span. 60 ft. Wing area, 678 sq. ft. Weight empty, 1,600 lb. Weight loaded, 2.550 lb. Maximum speed. 65 m.p.h. Landing speed, 32 mph.

Flight, March 14, 1914.

WHAT THERE WILL BE TO SEE AT OLYMPIA.

THE EXHIBITS.

Hamble River (Hamble River, Luke and Co.). (68.)

On the stand of the Hamble River, Luke and Co. will be shown a seaplane which, whilst following standard lines as regards its general arrangement, is interesting from the point of view of construction. The nacelle, as will be seen from the accompanying sketch, is of cigar shape, and carries at its rear end a 150 h.p. N.A.G. engine. The main floats, of which there are two, are of rather novel design, and incorporate in their construction several new and interesting features. For the design of this machine, we understand Mr. F. Murphy, formerly connected with the British and Colonial Aeroplane Co., is responsible, and, although this machine has not as yet been tried, there is little doubt but that it will give a good account of itself in the future, and thus become a valuable addition to the list of British seaplanes.

Flight, March 28, 1914.

THE OLYMPIA EXHIBITION.

THE EXHIBITS.

HAMBLE RIVER (HAMBLE RIVER, LUKE AND CO.).

UNFORTUNATELY the seaplane exhibited on this stand was not completely finished at the opening of the Show, and the temporary wiring up of the machine was hurriedly done, so that it is to be feared that a great number of the visitors received an unfavourable impression of the quality of workmanship in it. This is much to be regretted since it is the first time the machine has been shown in public and the workmanship is really very good. When one or two minor alterations have been effected and the machine has been properly tuned up, there is little doubt but that it will give a good account of itself.

In its general arrangement, the seaplane follows standard practice, being a biplane of the "pusher" type and having two main floats and two tail floats. The upper main plane is straight whilst the lower plane is set at a very pronounced dihedral angle in order to provide ample clearance when the machine is rolling. The two main floats are built up of two skins of cedar, the inner one of which is laid on diagonally over a framework of spruce and rock elm. The floats are divided into watertight compartments by double bulkheads, and a layer of canvas, soaked in varnish, is placed between the two skins. All the chassis struts carrying the floats are steel tubes, and it is intended, we understand, to provide springing of the floats by means of telescopic tubes and coil springs.

The cigar-shaped nacelle is of similar construction to that of the floats, and provides accommodation for the pilot and passengers. The seats are arranged tandem fashion, and the pilot controls the machine by means of a single vertical lever and a pivoted foot-bar. In the rear of the nacelle is mounted the engine, a 150 h.p. British N.A.G., which drives directly a Normale propeller.

The tail unit is carried on an outrigger consisting of four tail booms of spruce connected by struts of the same

material. These booms, one gathers, will later be replaced by steel tubes in order to provide a more rigid structure. The undivided elevator is hinged to the trailing edge of a fixed, non-lifting, stabilising plane, under the ends of which are mounted the twin rudders. Two small metal floats support the tail planes when the machine is at rest.

=== Aircraft ===
- Hamble River H.L.1 Seaplane

== After WWI ==
After the war, Luke concentrated on yacht building again. They had moved a bit up-river, just north of where the present Royal Southern Yacht Club opened their premises in 1937. It expanded to Satchell Lane and was known as "Top Yard" or "North Yard", which is now Hamble Yacht Services.

In 1925, Luke & Co. designed and built the "Hamble Star one design" sailing dinghy which became a popular racing dinghy with the local Hamble River Sailing Club. Albert Luke became the first Honorary Secretary of this club, established right after the war. Walter later became the Honorary Treasurer and Flag Officer.

In 1923, French war hero and Tennis Champion Alain Gerbault wanted to buy the Luke-built Lady Maud (1907) from her then owner Captain Dixon, but the owner would not sell. Gerbault thereupon arranged to buy the Dixon Kemp-designed Firecrest (1892) and started his famous voyage, sailing solo around the globe.

In 1935, Luke designed and built the five tonner Teal One Design; several other boats of this design were built by other yards. Teal won the Round the Isle (Cowes) race in 1935 and 1936, and was featured in Uffa Fox's book Racing, Cruising and Design (another Teal-class yacht, Content, would also win the first post war Round the Isle Race in 1945). Uffa said of the Teal design: "Teal was a delight to the eye, as one would expect, for she was designed by Luke, of Hamble. She proved herself to be such an able boat, both as a racer and as a day cruiser that more were built the following year."

== WWII ==
During World War II, Luke & Co., then already known as Luke Bros., built L.C.A.s (Landing Craft Assault) and the smaller L.C.P.s (Landing Craft Personnel) to the design of John Thornycroft & Co. Ltd. They were designed to carry troops only and were used at D-Day.

Luke was taken over by Port Hamble Ltd. at the end of World War II. Bill Hobbs, who came to the yard as an apprentice in 1923 and who had been working there as draftsman and designer since the late twenties, then designed the "Luke 5 tonners" for Port Hamble Ltd.

== Literature ==
- Luke's yard occasionally played a role in the novels of author Nevil Shute including prominent mentions in the novella "The Seafarers" published in 2002.
- Henry Fienness Speed mentions his visit to the yard of "W. S. Luke" when still at Itchen Ferry in his book Cruises in Small Yachts and Big Canoes of 1883, recalling the rebuilding by Luke of the Kate (of E. Middleton fame), which the writer called exceptionally stiff because of the very tall mast she was rigged with, and partly describing the then-famous Itchen Lass of 1879 (see boat list), a racer with an apparently very thin keel.
- Francis B. Cooke shows, among others, some design studies of A. R. Luke in the third edition of his book Cruising Hints.
- The Yachtsman's Annual and Who's Who 1938–9 contains line drawings, including a description of A. R. Luke's design Allure. She was the last one built of three sister ships. The others were Themis, a yawl built in 1930 and Shiris, a yawl built in 1937 with shallower draft to navigate the French canals.
- In A Manual of Yacht and Boat Sailing, regarding the latest Itchen-type boats, Dixon Kemp refers to the greater draught and the addition of a Yacht Counter: "Still, as they have grown out of the "Ithchen Boat," and still sail by a simple length measurement, it can be assumed that the 1882 craft is still to identified with Itchen Ferry, especially as the Itchen Ferry builders Payne and Luke have assisted in introducing these new-fashioned craft". The example, by a line drawing, is given of a boat of 30 ft waterline length.

== Selection of boats ==
Boats designed and/or built before 1940, showing tonnage (Thames measurement), year built, and designer (when known). Boats known to still exist as of 2011 are marked with a '*'.

Name	Tons	Year built	Designer	Notes
Active	36	1883	W. G. Luke	Owner: Robert Seward Pearce, Terminus Terrace, Southampton, 1883-1906 employed in the pilot service of the Southampton District.
Advent	52	1877	W. S. Luke	Sold foreign 1878; reregistered 1892, Owner: 1893 Walter Beavis, 83 High Street, Southampton; 1894-1904 H.G.W. Beavis or Haddon and Beavis, 83 High Street, Southampton Master: 1893 George Duval, Anderson Road, Southampton and Robert Kimber, Freemantle, Millbrook; 1894-1901 Robert Kimber, Millbrook (1897 of Eling); 1902 J. Rainsley, Threefield Lane, Southampton; 1903 George Yeates, Charlotte Street, Southampton; 1903-4 Henry Yeates, Charlotte Street Voyages: 1893-1901 trading inside Isle of Wight; 1902-4 Lightering inside Isle of Wight Converted to lighter 1902
Alethea II	8	1910	A. R. Luke	built for J. G. H. Cockburn (see also Hope), lines in Yachting Monthly January 1912
Alethea III	9	1935	A. R. Luke	information in The Yachtsman March 1935 and Yachting World April 1935
Alice	2		A. R. Luke	
Allure *	24	1938	A. R. Luke	Since 1985 Allure is sailing under German flag, currently (2012) in the Eastern Mediterranean. She has received a major refit in 2004 / 2005. Lines are in The Yachtsman's Annual and who's who 1938-9 of 1938 page 119, including a description. She was the last one built of three sister ships. The others were Themis, yawl, built in 1930 and Shiris, yawl, 1937 with shallower draft to navigate the French canals. Information Yachting World July 1938 and Yachting Monthly August 1942.
Ann	2	1913	A. R. Luke	
Annacis	2	1913	A. R. Luke	
Apteryx *	17	1894	W. S. Luke	A Gaff Yawl, renamed Glance in 1927, re-rigged as a Bermudan cutter in 1947, website with History, photos, etc. to present day at www.yachtglance.com Currently based Northern Ireland
Badger	2	1909	A.R. Luke	later Kelpie
Banshee	17		W. S. Luke	later Lloyds registers lists her as 14 tons, claims both Bansee's were designed by A. R. Luke
Banshee	11	1900	W. G. Luke	
Bessie	77	1874	W. S. Luke	Built at Itchen Ferry by W.S. Luke, engines by Guy and Adams, West Cowes Steam, screw Reg. tons 52 net, 77 gross Crew lists: 1874-1, 1876-1, 1877-4, 1878-1, 1879-NA, 1880-1, 1881-2, 1882-2, 1883-3, 1884-2, 1886-0, 1887-1 Owner: 1874 Earl of Harrington, Derby; 1878 Lt. Col. A.J.L. Freemantle, 5 Tilney Street, Park Lane, London; 1880 ditto; 1887 H.G. Walkins Inn Esq., Hants. Master: 1874 Thomas Lashmar; 1876–81 Henry Wadley, 3 Clifton Terrace; 1882-3 Alfred Bailey; 1884-7 A.P.J. Freemantle Voyages: 1874 yachting off coast; 1876 Cowes — Norway; 1877 Colchester via Lisbon to Mediterranean, laid up at Cowes; 1878, 1880 laid up at Cowes; 1881 ditto and pleasure cruising to Mediterranean and Black Seas; 1882 laid up, then yachting around Europe and Mediterranean; 1883-4 laid up in Southampton water; 1887 Trading inside I.W. Sold to foreigners 1887.
Biddy*	2	1913	A. R. Luke	later Jesse Hamble One Design, lines and construction drawings including description in Yachting Monthly, June 1913 page 165
Blue Bell	7			
Brenda	2			
Cabri	35			
Cacouna	50	1923	John G. Alden	
Chipmunk	6	1880	W. S. Luke	cutter built for Sidney Clemens Watson
Chita	22			
Chough *	2	1927	A. R. Luke	sloop, built by Brooke & Halls for H. S. Halgar
Christine	7			
Ciris *	9	1906	A. R. Luke	yawl, built for W.S. Winans
Clover*	42	1938	A. R. Luke	information Motorboat & Yachting and Yachting World both in November 1938, Yachting Monthly December 1938 page 162.
Content	5		A. R. Luke	Teal one design
Cormorant	3	1899	A. R. Luke	yawl
Cormorant *	5	1911	A. R. Luke	later Sparrow, Sunbeam
Cynthia	4			
Cypraea	2			
Daisy	32	1887	W. S. Luke	
Dancing Girl	2	1891	H. W. Ridsdale	0/5 rater
Daphne	9	1882	W. S. Luke	25 ft. wl racer
Dimples	7	1903	A. R. Luke	later Mooween (from 1904)
Din Niklé	2			
Diver	2			Seine Racer
Dot	2	1913	A. R. Luke	
Ecila	2	1913	A. R. Luke	
Edna	2			
Eira	8	1896	W. S. Luke	
Emu				int. 5m
Estelle *	10	1910	A. R. Luke	cutter, information in the Yachting Monthly of June 1942
Eve	4	1903	W. G. Luke	built by W. Fife
Fantasy	3	1893	R. Vogan	1 rater built for Randall Vogan
Fearnought *	9	1897	Arthur Payne	built by A. Westmacott, according to Lloyds Yacht register. Yachting World of 1896 mention Arthur Payne her designer, built by Luke
Figaro *	2	1913	A. R. Luke	Hamble One Design. Repaired in the 1980s
Flying Scud	2			
Frolic	4			
Galene *	5	1937	A. R. Luke	Teal one design
Gay Maid				
Gladys	10			
Gladoris II *	49	1928	A. R. Luke	Information Yachting Monthly July 1928
Glance*	17	1894	A.R.Luke	Launched as Apteryx (see above) Renamed in 1927. Now in Northern Ireland. Website www.yachtglance.cim
Gloaming	11	1906	A. R. Luke	
Grant Duchess	63	1898	A. R. Luke & L. G. Moore	later Rosalind (1912), Emy a large photo of her is published as the Yachtsmans supplement of May 1, 1902
Grouper	17	1903	A. R. Luke	
Grouper II	9	1904	A. R. Luke	Yawl
Helaflote	21	1913	A. R. Luke	
Helaflote	2	1913	A. R. Luke	both Helaflote's for same owner
Hope	9	1932	A. R. Luke	built for J. G. H. Cockburn, lines in Yachting Monthly April 1932 page 426-427
Horla	47			
Hurricane Wake	6	1939	F. Shepherd	
Imogen II*	6	1911	Albert Strange	Yawl
Iris	28	1879	W. S. Luke	Pilot
Iris		1892	W. S. Luke	Racer for Seine, built for mr Tordo, Paris
Isabel	2		A. R. Luke	
Itchen Lass		1879	W. G. Luke	25 ft. wl racer, broken up 1893
Itchen Lass	7	1911	W. G. Luke	
Jeanette	7	1911 or 1907	A. R. Luke	Ketch rigged motor yacht, built by Everett
Jesse		1879	W. S. Luke	
Ju-Ju *	2	1913	A. R. Luke	later Doddy, Florence. Hamble One Design, lines and construction drawings including description in Yachting Monthly, June 1913 page 165
June	29	1912	A. R. Luke	
Kaffir	9			
Kali	2	1913	A. R. Luke	built by A. Apps
Kea	4	1897	A. R. Luke	Lug rigged
Kelpie	2	1914	A. R. Luke	built by Lt.-Col. G. P. Stewart
Kitcat	2	1913	A. R. Luke	
Lady Maud*	10	1907	A. R. Luke	cutter, built for capt. H. M. Taylor, Plymouth
Lady Ruth	27	1893	W. S. Luke	(later Othona) according to the Yachtsman of 1892/3 she was only 15 tons, built for H. L. Trollope.
Laverock	59	1875	W. S. Luke	Yawl (former Nixie, VixenII) altered 1878
Lila	8		A. R. Luke	
Lily Maid*	25	1904	A. R. Luke	
Lily Maid II*	14	1911	A. R. Luke	
Lily Maid III	17	1925	A. R. Luke	information Motorboat and Yachting October 1924 and September 1925
Lily Maid IV	39	1927	A. R. Luke & Paul Jouët	built by Chant. Nav. de Sartrouville, France, for Capt. C. E. A. L. Rumbold
Loiterer	23	1901	A. R. Luke	later Hawk, built by A. Apps, Emsworth
Lorna Doone	3			
Louise Henriëtte	3			
Lucia	49	1928	John G. Alden	
Maid	14	1911	A R. Luke	Ex Lilly maid ?
Manon	9	1902	A. R. Luke	built for mr B. Degetan, Nieustedten, Altona, Germany
March Hare	3			
Maresca	11	1906	A. R. Luke	'Maresca' was owned by John Clarke and raced in first OGA Solent Race, 1959. Originally a yawl, she was converted to cutter in 1939 and shortened by 2 ft. in 1955. 'Maresca' was stranded and lost off Rainbow Bar, Tichfield Haven in the Solent 30 October 1965. Her spars, sails, rigging, etc. were salvaged and used in the restoration of 'Richard Davey'.
Marguerite	47			
Marigui	2	1913		Built by Luke, no design given in Lloyds. In 1926 owned by C. E. Nicholson, Gosport. Perhaps designed by Camper & Nicholson? Not registered in 1914 and 1921 Lloyds register
Marion	3			
Maritana	25	1883	W. S. Luke	
May	15	1875	W. S. Luke	cutter
May	14	1894	W. S. Luke	
Mayfair	57	1914	A. R. Luke	
Meergreis	3			
Merrie Duchess	35	1884	W. S. Luke	Yawl
Midge	18	1884	W. S. Luke	later Nathalie
Milly	31	1879	St. C. Byrne	later Starlight
Minnie *	11	1893	W. S. Luke	
Minx	2	1913	A. R. Luke	
Moonfleet		1928	Charles E. Nicholson	
Moth	4	1906	A. R. Luke	Sloop, later Whimbrel, Pansy
Moth II	5	1912	Albert Strange	Yawl, lines, sailplan and extensive specifications are described in the Yachting Monthly of August 1923, p. 231-238, together with a voyage and including a picture of Moth II under sail
Mylio	7			
Nan	2	1913	A. R. Luke	
Nat	7			
Nathalie	18			
Neaira Junior	2			
Nephele	8	1908, 1912	A. R. Luke	yawl, built for Richard Curling, Southampton. Photo with description in Le Yacht nr. 1665, 22 jan. 1910
Nigger	5	1885	W. S. Luke	
Nona	3	1887 or 1897?	W. G. Luke	
Nyleptha	4	1904	A. R. Luke	Lug rigged
Oda	3			
œnanthe	29	1883		Yawl
Ondina *	9	1906	A. R. Luke	cutter, built for Gregory John Bond, Greatwood Estate, Penryn, Mylor
Outis *	6	1914	A. R. Luke	later Shona
Paulina	9	1904	A. R. Luke	Cutter
Pampa III *	50	1914	A. R. Luke	later Doris, Grey Mist, Cupid, Glala. Lloyds 1914 states built 1914, later editions state 1915. Completed 1920
Pavonia	20	1902	A. R. Luke	built to Lloyds specification
Penguin	21	1913	A. R. Luke	
Phakoe *	5	1937	A. R. Luke	Teal One Design
Pixie *	3	1890	W. G. Luke	
Presiosa	10	before 1892		Seine racer, Paris
Pride of the Itchen		1870	W. S. Luke	13 feet fishingboat for capt. Diaper
Puffin*	21	1913	A. R. Luke	now named Sahara of Ardgour original steam engine replaced with a gardner 4lw.
Quaker Girl	9	1911	A. R. Luke	Sloop, int. 7M, a successful racing yacht which won A. R. Luke a design award
Quinque	11	1890	Col. Bucknill	5 rater
Racoon	2			
Ranee	5	1931	A. R. Luke	
Raven	11	1881	W. S. Luke	Cutter, altered in 1886, 30 ft. wl racer, according to the Yachtsman in 1893 possibly the best all round 30 footer ever.
Rita	3	1900	A. R. Luke	Lug rigged built for H. Dupuy, Guernsey
Robert and Sarah	39	1876	W. S. Luke	commercial vessel
Rogue	4	1892	H. W. Ridsdale	Cutter, 1 rater built for Randall Vogan
Rondinella II	4	1897	H. Emmons	Linear Rater
Rosalind	63	1898		Yawl
Rosette	12	1891		cutter built for captain Lysons R. E.
Rosie	2	1896	W. S. Luke	18ft Linear Rater, built for H Myring
Rowena	4	1904	A. R. Luke	Sloop
Runa	10	1913	A. R. Luke	
St. Hilda	144	1875	W. S. Luke	Schooner
San Toy	5	1901	A. R. Luke	later Sparrow
Scylla	7			
Sea Urchin	17			motor yacht
Shiris *	22	1937	A. R. Luke	Wooden Boats 1985 July/August, No.65, p. 83 with photo of Shiris as participant of the Museum of Yachting's Classic Yacht Regatta 1985 in Newport, Rhode Island. See also under Allure
Silver heels	8	1912	J. I. Thornycroft	later Takista
Siska	6	1929	A. R. Luke	
Snowdrop	5			
Sparrow	3	1899	W. S. luke	Cutter
Spray	5	1877	design unknown	
Sprite	4		A. R. Luke	
Susanne	25	1876	W. S. Luke	later La Belle Susanne,Vega, Yawl
Starlight	31			
St Hilda	96	1875	W. S. Luke	
Sweet Nell	20		A. R. Luke	
Syringa	5	1906	A. R. Luke	Lug rigged, 24 ft. linear rater built for M. W. Greenhill, Southampton. Photo of Syringa in Le yacht of August 18, 1906 p. 528
Tadpole	3	1896	W. S. Luke	
Talofa	5	1906	A. R. Luke	Sloop, design nr. 130
Tasma*	8	1897	W. G. Luke	information Yachting Monthly januari 1942
Tasina	8	1897	W. S. Luke	Cutter for C. Yorke
Tasma	8	1897	W. S. Luke	Cutter
Teal	5	1935	A. R. Luke	Teal One Design
Tee Jay *	8	1933	A. R. Luke	
Tiphaine	9	1939	A. R. Luke	
Themis	22	1930	A. R. Luke	see also under Allure. Information Yachting monthly March 1930 and Yachting world June 1930
Thora	5	1937	A. R. Luke	later Galene
Tiger	5	1937	A. R. Luke	later Lalaerne
Tiny	2	1891	H. W. Ridsdale	(0/5 rater); built for Randall Vogan
Triple Alliance	10	1935	A. R. Luke	
Ulerin	10	1886	G. L. Watson	built for E. H. Hamilton, Co. Down
Umjata	3	1911	A. R. Luke	
Usna	6			
Valentine	20	1902	A. R. Luke	Yawl
Veronique *	33	1907	A. R. Luke	Lines of Veronique are in the 1907 edition of Yachting Monthly, page 79-81, built to Lloyds specification.
Vie	2			
Vilar	6	1926	A. R. Luke	built for Ramón Pérez, Santiago de Cuba
Vixen *		1915		
Waltham	98	1882		
Wastrel	11	1891	W. S. Luke	
Water Lily *	8	1904	A. R. Luke	later Windhover
Wayward	15	1897	A. E. Payne	
Weemelah	9	1937	A. R. Luke	
Ytene	24	1910	A. R. Luke & F. R. S. Bircham	Yawl, later Curluw
