= Itchen ferry (disambiguation) =

An Itchen ferry is a type of small gaff rig cutter.

Itchen ferry may also refer to the following in Hampshire, England:

- Itchen Ferry village, took its name from the above boat
- Woolston Floating Bridge, historically referred to as the Itchen Ferry

== See also ==
- Itchen (disambiguation)
