= Itchen =

Itchen may refer to:

== Places in England ==
=== Administrative areas ===
- Itchen Abbas, a village on the River Itchen about 4 miles (6.4 km) north-east of Winchester in Hampshire, England
- Itchen Stoke and Ovington, an English civil parish consisting of two adjoining villages in Hampshire, England, 2 miles (3.2 km) west of Alresford
- Itchen Urban District, a former local authority, now part of Southampton, Hampshire
- Itchen Valley, civil parish in Hampshire
- Southampton Itchen (UK Parliament constituency)

=== Waterways and associated locations ===
- Itchen Bridge, a high-level hollow box girder bridge over the River Itchen in Southampton, Hampshire
- Itchen Navigation, a 10.4-mile (16.7 km) disused canal system in Hampshire, England
- Itchen Valley Country Park, s a country park in West End, Hampshire, England
- Itchen Way, a 31.80-mile (51.18 km) long-distance footpath following the River Itchen in Hampshire, England
- River Itchen, Hampshire
- River Itchen, Warwickshire

== Educational institutions ==
- Itchen College, a mixed sixth form college in Bitterne, Southampton, Hampshire, England

== Other uses ==
- HMS Itchen, several ships of the Royal Navy

== See also ==
- Itchen ferry (disambiguation)
