= Hamble-le-Rice =

Village and parish in Hampshire, England

Coordinates: 50°51′25″N 1°19′15″W

- Village
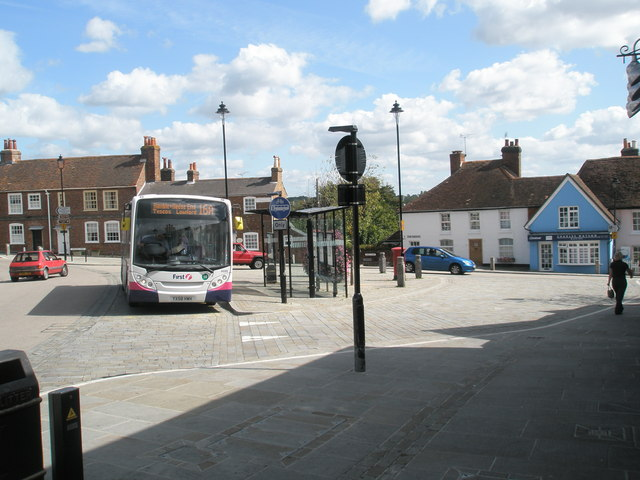
- The Square, Hamble

- The village crest

- Location within Hampshire
- Population: 4,695 (2011 Census)
- OS grid reference: SU479066
- Civil parish: Hamble-le-Rice
- District: Eastleigh
- Shire county: Hampshire
- Region: South East
- Country: England
- Sovereign state: United Kingdom
- Post town: Southampton
- Postcode district: SO31
- Dialling code: 023
- Police: Hampshire and Isle of Wight
- Fire: Hampshire and Isle of Wight
- Ambulance: South Central
- UK Parliament: Hamble Valley

Hamble-le-Rice, commonly known as Hamble, is a village and civil parish in the borough of Eastleigh, in Hampshire, England. It is best known for being a flying training centre during the Second World War and is a popular yachting location. The village and the River Hamble also featured in the 1980s BBC television series Howards' Way. The village centre, known as The Square, Hamble, has a more traditional English village aesthetic which differentiates it from the small industrial areas (mostly marinas) close to the village. In 2011 it had a population of 4695.

== Location ==
Hamble-le-Rice is on the south coast of England, south-east of Southampton at the tip of the Hamble peninsula, bounded by Netley, Butlocks Heath, Bursledon, Southampton Water and the River Hamble.

== History ==
Although previously known as "Hamble", "Hamelea", "Hammel", and "Ham-en-le-Rice", the village's official name is now Hamble-le-Rice. The name "Hamble" is still in common usage. On 27 April 1992, the civil parish was renamed from "Hamble" to "Hamble-le-Rice". To the south of the village, lies the site of an Iron Age promontory hillfort, Hamble Common Camp.

The place-name 'Hamble-le-Rice' is first attested in a French document of 1147, where it appears as Amle. It appears as Hamele in 1270, and as hamele in the Rys in 1404. The village takes its name from the River Hamble; the Rice is the Old English hrīs meaning 'brushwood' or perhaps by extension 'scrubland', and of which the modern form is the word rushes. Thus a modern form of the name might be 'Hamble-in-the-Rushes'. An alternative explanation for the "-le-Rice" ending is that this derives from the Norman French "en le rys", meaning "on the hill".

The area is home to the remains of a defensive structure dating to the reign of King Henry VIII. Known as St Andrew's Castle, investigations suggest that it consisted of a rectangular structure fronted by a gun platform with a semi-circular layout. The structure was protected by a moat, with a two gun platforms mounted on the counterscarp. The structure was intact as late as the early 17th century.

== Aerospace ==
Hamble-le-Rice was the home of a major flying school before and during the Second World War for aircraft including the Spitfire, the Lancaster and the Wellington. Over 500 aircraft were built there including the prototype Armstrong Whitworth Ensign and Albemarle, which were first flown in 1938 and 1940. In 1960 the Air Corporations Joint Training Scheme (later, British Airways) fixed wing and helicopter training school was established there, as the Hamble College of Air Training. The south airfield has long since disappeared and the north airfield has been partially developed as housing; the remainder is overgrown and owned by property developers Persimmon.

The aviation industry retains a large interest in Hamble-le-Rice, with the Hamble Aerostructures factory, now a subsidiary of the Spanish company Aernnova, in Kings Avenue.

The following units were here at some point:

- No. 1 Basic Air Navigation School RAF
- No. 2 Air Experience Flight RAF
- No. 3 Elementary and Reserve Flying Training School RAF
- No. 3 Elementary Flying Training School RAF
- No. 11 Air Observers Navigation School RAF
- No. 14 Reserve Flying School RAF
- No. 15 Ferry Pilots Pool ATA
- 780 Naval Air Squadron
- No. 2706 Squadron RAF Regiment
- Southampton University Air Squadron

== Industrial areas ==
Hamble-le-Rice is home to three main marinas offering marine services and goods to the boating industry. In addition, large factories and smaller industrial units off Ensign Way and Hamble Lane are used by CooperVision, Qioptiq Photonics Ltd., BP, Hoyer, GE and others. Some of these businesses are 24-hour operations with large numbers of staff who commute to work. The fuel terminal itself is not visible from the B3397: there was extensive development in the early 2000s when wartime hangars were demolished and high-density housing built next to the road, near the terminal. The Royal Yachting Association (RYA), a non-profit organisation, has its offices in Hamble.

== Schools ==
There are two schools in Hamble-Le-Rice:

- Hamble Primary School
- Hamble School, a secondary school (formerly Hamble Community Sports College)

== The river and environment ==
Hamble-le-Rice is a boating mecca: the nearby River Hamble is often packed with marine traffic and, during the summer, the whole village is crowded with people out enjoying the water, local restaurants and many pubs. The village and its river is one of the many locations that made up the fictional village of Tarrant, in the BBC television series Howards' Way, shown weekly on BBC One in the late 1980s.

Hamble-le-Rice is home to Hamble Common, a variety of estuary wildlife, and other scenic walks.

== Fuel terminal ==
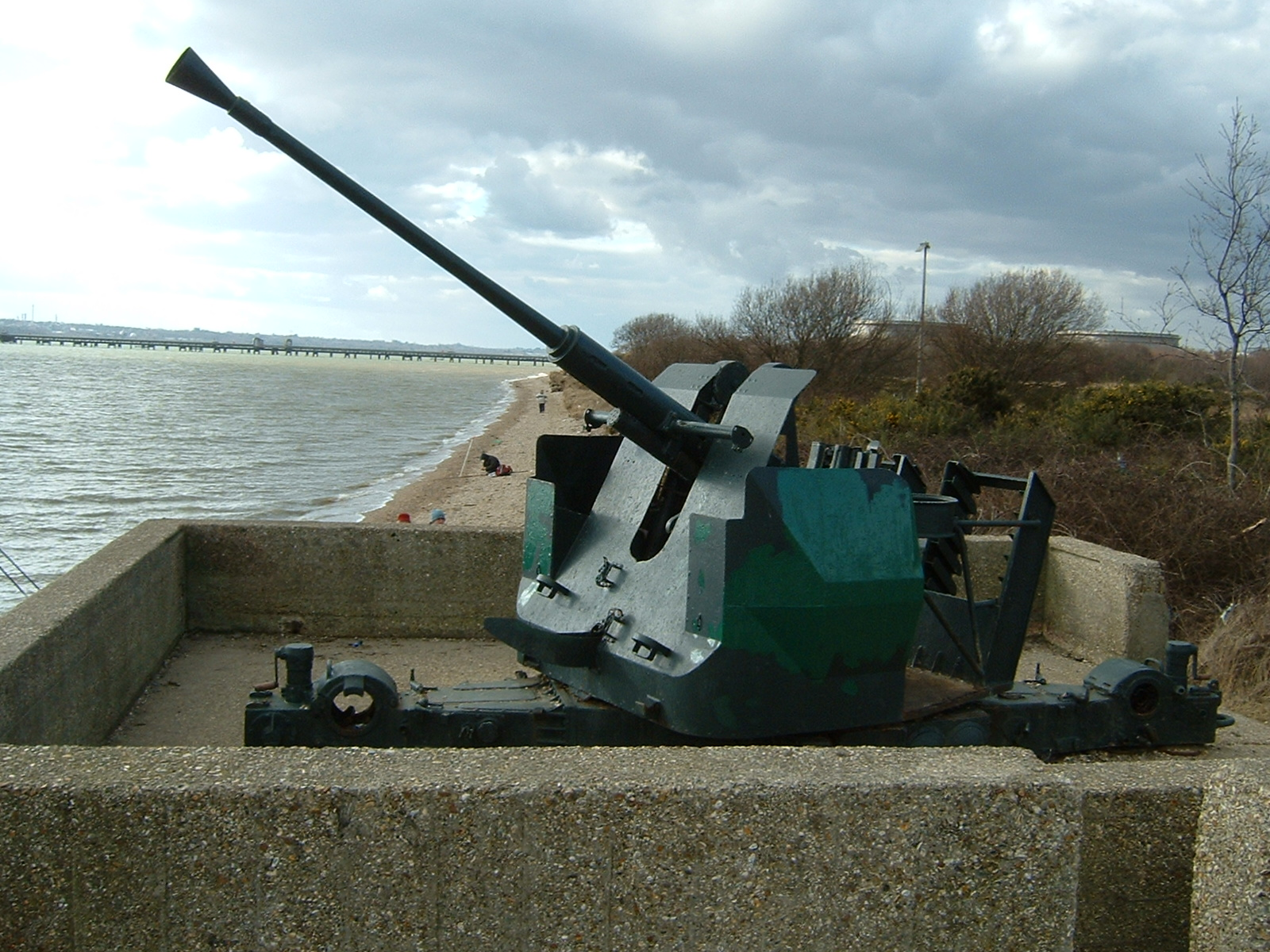
This WWII Anti Aircraft emplacement on Hamble Common protected the fuel terminal and jetty (both visible in background)

Hamble fuel terminal was opened by Shell in 1924, whilst BP was still afloat using a converted passenger liner as a fuel tender. In 1930 the two companies formed a joint venture and BP moved to Hamble. This partnership was dissolved in 1976, with the Hamble terminal passing to BP. A 2016 attempt to sell off the terminal was unsuccessful; however Hoyer now handles BPs bulk fuel road transport operation.

A pipeline runs under Southampton Water from the Fawley oil refinery which supplies the BP fuel terminal at Hamble. This fuel terminal was used to supply PLUTO, during the invasion of Europe in World War II. The PLUTO pipeline started at Shanklin on the Isle of Wight and was supplied by ship from Hamble. The jetty at this fuel terminal was extended in 1943/44 so that more ships could be loaded simultaneously.

Fuel is transported from this depot both day and night, in particular early mornings (between 3am and 6am), by 44 tonne road tankers along the B3397, as well as by pipeline to major industry and airports. Markers showing the route of the pipeline can be seen at various points in neighbouring Botley. A now disused branch line ran from the terminal to the Portsmouth to Southampton railway. This is now the scenic Strawberry Trail.

== Transport links ==
The Hamble Peninsula has one main access road, the B3397, Hamble Lane, which is approximately 3 miles (4.8 km) long and goes straight through the village from the junction with the A27 Portsmouth road. Hamble Lane has had numerous incidences of traffic accidents. and at its intersection with Portsmouth Road an Air Quality Management Area (AQMA) exists to monitor nitrogen dioxide traffic pollutants. The B3397 is a very high volume road; a traffic count in March 2003 showed around 16,300 vehicles in a 24-hour period. Daily traffic congestion and slow moving queues are due to the large number of inbound and outbound commuters, on staggered work shifts. Many businesses supply local companies as BP Oil UK, CooperVision and GE Aviation and minor industry and services within the four marinas and industrial areas off Ensign Way. Road oil and petrol tankers form the bulk of the heavy goods vehicles along this road, numbering a few hundred vehicle movements per day. The village is served by Hamble railway station, about two miles from the centre of the village, which provides hourly services to both Southampton Central and Portsmouth Harbour. It is also linked by a pedestrian ferry to Warsash, and has frequent bus services to Southampton - the '15' provided by Bluestar, via Netley and Woolston. There is also a service, the '49h', to Hedge End, provided by Stagecoach South.

== People ==
- Sir Sam Fay, General manager of the Great Central Railway 1902–22, was born here in 1856.
- Michael S. Robinson, naval art historian, was born here in 1910.
- Boat builder W.S. Luke and his sons Albert Luke and Walter Luke came here in the late 1880s to establish their boatyard.
- Ronnie and Reggie Kray had a cottage in the Village]
- Tracy Edwards, Skipper of Maiden, the first all-female round-the-world crew, lived in the village for a while.
- Robert Greenhalgh, Volvo Ocean Race veteran and four times sailing world champion, lived in the village
- Dani Rowe, née King - cyclist (Women's Team Pursuit World Champion 2011, 2012 and 2013; Women's Team Pursuit Gold Medallist at London 2012) the cycle path into the village is named in her honour and she is the reason for the village post box being painted gold by the Royal Mail to commemorate her success at the home olympics.
- Basil Lubbock, sailor, soldier and historian lived in the village.

== Sport and leisure ==
The main sporting activity in the village is sailing with it being the centre of UK offshore sailing and a hub for inshore yacht and keelboat racing. This is partly due to its mainland location and closeness to Cowes on the Isle of Wight. There are three sailing clubs within the village:

- Hamble River Sailing Club was founded in 1919
- RAF Yacht Club open its Hamble club house in 1952
- Royal Southern Yacht Club opened in the 1930s, with the club one of the oldest in the world being established in 1837

In addition Warsash Sailing Club based on the other side of the river also contributes significantly to sailing activities within the village hosting the annual spring series championship and other regattas. Together with offshore racing primarily organized by the Royal Ocean Racing Club and the Junior Offshore Group.

The Royal Yachting Association, the sport's national governing body, has had its headquarters in the village since the early 2000s, when it moved from Eastleigh to a new purpose-built building.

The village has two non-league football clubs; Folland Sports and Hamble Club, both of which play in the Wessex League.

A speedway training track used to operate at Hamble in the early 1950s. There is now a sports college in Hamble to provide recreation and leisure.
