= Itchen Bridge =

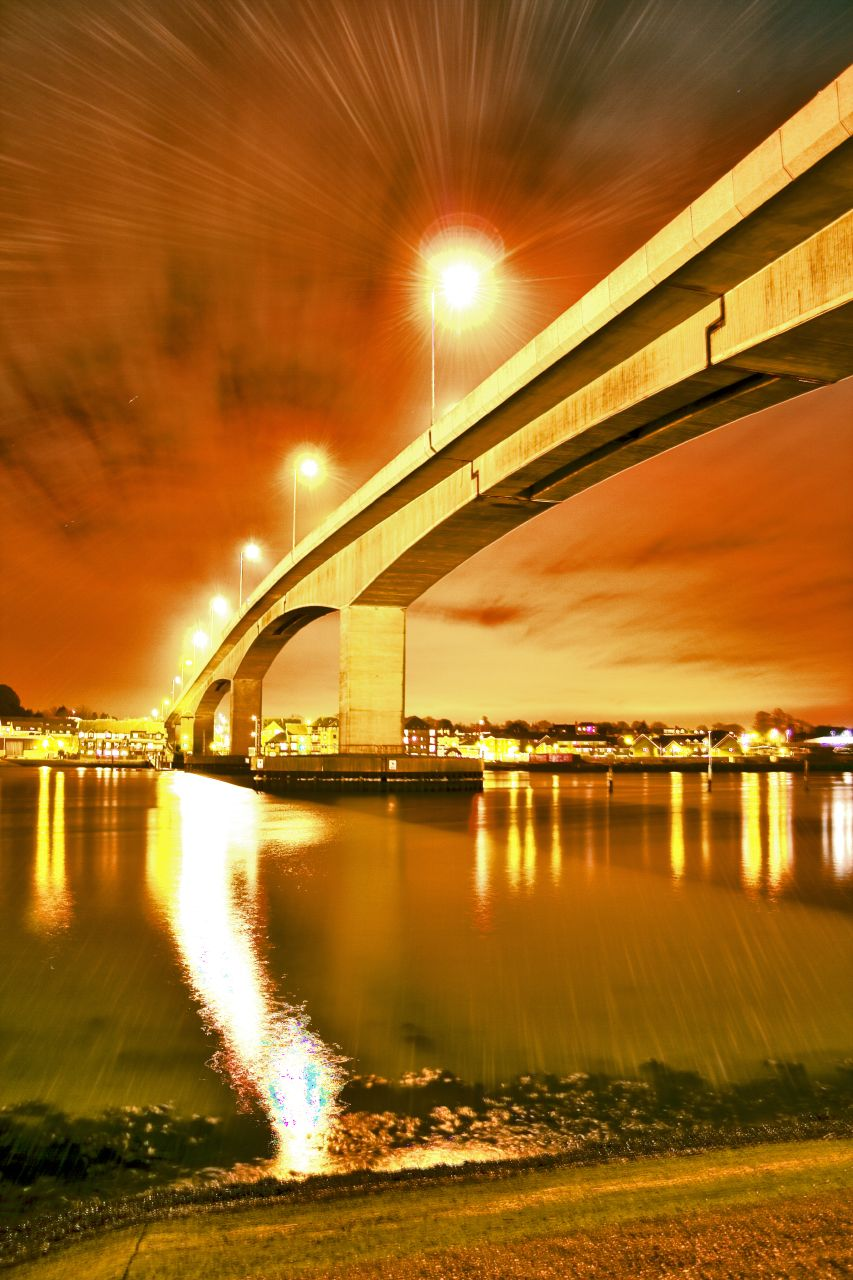
- Coordinates: 50°53′56″N 1°23′05″W
- Carries: A3025 road (2 lanes)
- Crosses: River Itchen
- Locale: Southampton
- Owner: Southampton City Council
- Preceded by: Northam Bridge

Characteristics
- Design: High-level hollow box girder
- Total length: 800 metres (870 yd)
- Height: 28 metres (92 ft)
- Clearance above: open

History
- Engineering design by: Kier Limited
- Construction cost: £12.174 million
- Opened: 13 July 1977
- Inaugurated: 22 March 1974
- Replaces: Woolston Floating Bridge

Statistics
- Toll: variable (based on vehicle type)

Location
- Interactive map of Itchen Bridge

The Itchen Bridge is a bridge over the River Itchen in Southampton, Hampshire. It is a high-level hollow box girder bridge. It is located about a mile from the river mouth. The bridge spans 870 yards (800 m), is 92 feet (28 m) at its highest point and weighs 62,000 tons. The bridge connects the A3025 Portsmouth Road to Southampton. It was built to replace the former chain ferry, known as the Floating Bridge, that crossed the river at that point. The bridge's set of blue energy-saving lights can be seen from up to 5 miles (8 km) down Southampton Water from the bridge.

The bridge has achieved notoriety as a venue for suicide, with over 200 alleged suicides recorded since its opening in 1977, prompting calls for the construction of preventive measures along its length.

== History ==
=== Prior efforts ===
The first attempt to build a crossing below Northam Bridge began in 1833. The plan for a 17-arch swing bridge was stopped by the Admiralty over concerns on the effects it would have on navigation. Instead the Woolston Floating Bridge was built which opened in 1836.

In 1926, in the context of the construction of the Queensway Tunnel under the River Mersey, Southampton council hired Basil Mott to investigate the various options for building a fixed crossing across the lower River Itchen. Along with providing costs for a tunnel and a high level crossing, he recommended a low level opening span bridge.

Another planning effort was undertaken in 1936. The full report took two years to compile and included sinking boreholes into the Itchen. Again a low level crossing with a swinging section was the preferred option. Attempts to raise funds for this bridge were delayed by the need to carry out work on Northam Bridge and then by the outbreak of World War II. During World War II the construction of a pontoon bridge was briefly considered, but it was decided that the floating bridge was adequate.

A further plan for a low level bridge was produced in 1947, but again work on Northam Bridge took priority.

In 1955, with the work on Northam Bridge complete, R. Travers Morgan and Partners were commissioned to produce a report on a new bridge. Two reports were produced over the following two years; they recommended a fixed structure with a dual carriageway and 55 feet (17 m) feet of headroom, or another with 80 feet (24 m) of headroom. An Act authorising the bridge, the Southampton Corporation Act 1960 (8 & 9 Eliz. 2. c. xlii), was obtained. However, in 1961 Ministry of Transport announced it would not be providing financial support for the bridge, which again put the project on hold.

=== Planning ===
Southampton Corporation Act 1973
- Act of Parliament
- Parliament of the United Kingdom
- Long title: An Act to make further provision in relation to the bridge across the river Itchen authorised to be constructed under the Southampton Corporation Act 1960; and for other purposes.
- Citation: 1973 c. xix

Dates
- Royal assent: 18 July 1973

Other legislation
- Repealed by: Hampshire Act 1983
- Relates to: Southampton Corporation Act 1960

Status: Repealed

Text of statute as originally enacted

In the mid-1960s it became clear to the council that some form of action would have to be taken. The floating bridges were reaching the end of their life, requiring an expensive refit or replacement, and the compulsory purchase powers under the 1960 Act would expire in 1973. With no possibility of funding from the Ministry of Transport, the council started to investigate constructing a toll bridge. The council requested a formal report on the possibility of a toll bridge from the City Engineer and Surveyor in October 1969, and the report was delivered on 12 March 1970. It recommended a two-lane high level bridge with 80 feet of head-space to allow ships from the dockyards upstream to pass under it. A bridge with an opening span was rejected on the basis of the disruption it would cause to traffic every time it had to open. With a toll bridge having been decided upon, it was decided it could also be used to control traffic levels over the bridge to avoid the need to significantly upgrade local roads. This was unpopular with motoring organisations, who opposed the council's attempt to get a bill through Parliament to authorise the toll bridge. This opposition was overcome after debate at parliamentary committee level, and the council obtained its Act of Parliament, the Southampton Corporation Act 1973 (c. xix) in July 1973.

The contract for building the bridge was then put out for tender and was awarded to the lowest bidder, Kier Group (then Kier Ltd), at a price of £5,710,630.

=== Construction ===
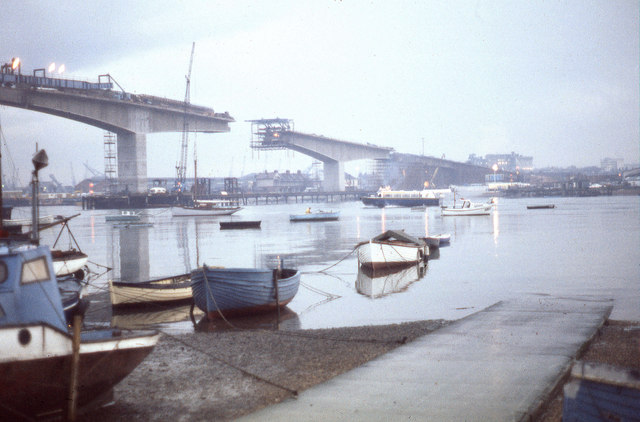
The bridge under construction, 1976

The ceremonial start of construction took place on 22 March 1974, with the Mayor of Southampton driving the first pile. Along with basic site preparation, the first job was the construction of two jetties, one from each bank, to the position in the Itchen where the two piers in the river would be built. The jetty from the east bank was built first; the one on the west bank was delayed by the need to fill in an area of shallow water known as the Chapel Inlet.

Once preparation was complete 100 feet (30 m) long piles were driven into the ground. Transport limitations meant the piles had to be brought in 50 feet (15 m) sections before being welded together onsite. The piling process on the east bank of the Itchen was delayed by the piles hitting the remains of a jetty which had to be partially removed. Meanwhile, on the west side delays were caused after construction disturbed a poorly documented system of sewers.

Once the piling was complete pile caps were added and the bridge supports constructed on top of them. From the top of the bridge supports cantilevered arms were then constructed outwards. They were constructed symmetrically in both directions at once in order to keep the weight on the supports balanced. Once the cantilevered arms were complete the sections that spanned the gap between them were cast from concrete in the form of box beams on top of the arms before being moved into place on hydraulic bogies suspended from girders. In order to balance the weight large concrete blocks were placed on the opposite arm. During this period work was slowed by the 1976 British Isles heat wave and subsequent rains.

=== Opening ===
The original plan was for the bridge to open on 1 May 1977 but construction fell behind schedule and instead it was opened 1 June 1977.

Before opening to motor vehicles it was decided to hold a pedestrian-only day for people to examine the bridge. This was held on Tuesday 31 May 1977. The first member of the public across was 69 year old Mrs Edith Parks at around 13:30, with a general opening at 14:00. The bridge opened to motor traffic the following day, 1 June, at 10:30 with the mayoral car leading the way. Former Southampton MP Horace King, Baron Maybray-King decided to celebrate by being driven across in a horse-drawn landau. Southampton's buses started using the bridge on 12 June.

The bridge was named by Princess Alexandra, The Hon Mrs Angus Ogilvy on 13 July 1977. This had originally been planned as an opening ceremony, but this was changed when the bridge was completed before that date.

=== Maintenance and changes ===
In 2011 the bridge lighting was switched to white LEDs with blue LEDs placed on the uprights.

As part of the bridge's maintenance eight expansion joints were replaced in March 2016.

In February 2022, the city council announced a bridge strengthening programme with works on the bridge in 2023 and 2024, at a cost of around £3.8 million. In February 2024, the city council announced that the bridge would be closed to vehicular traffic for eight weeks for maintenance and improvements. The works are to include improvements to the drainage on the bridge as well as resurfacing.

== Toll ==
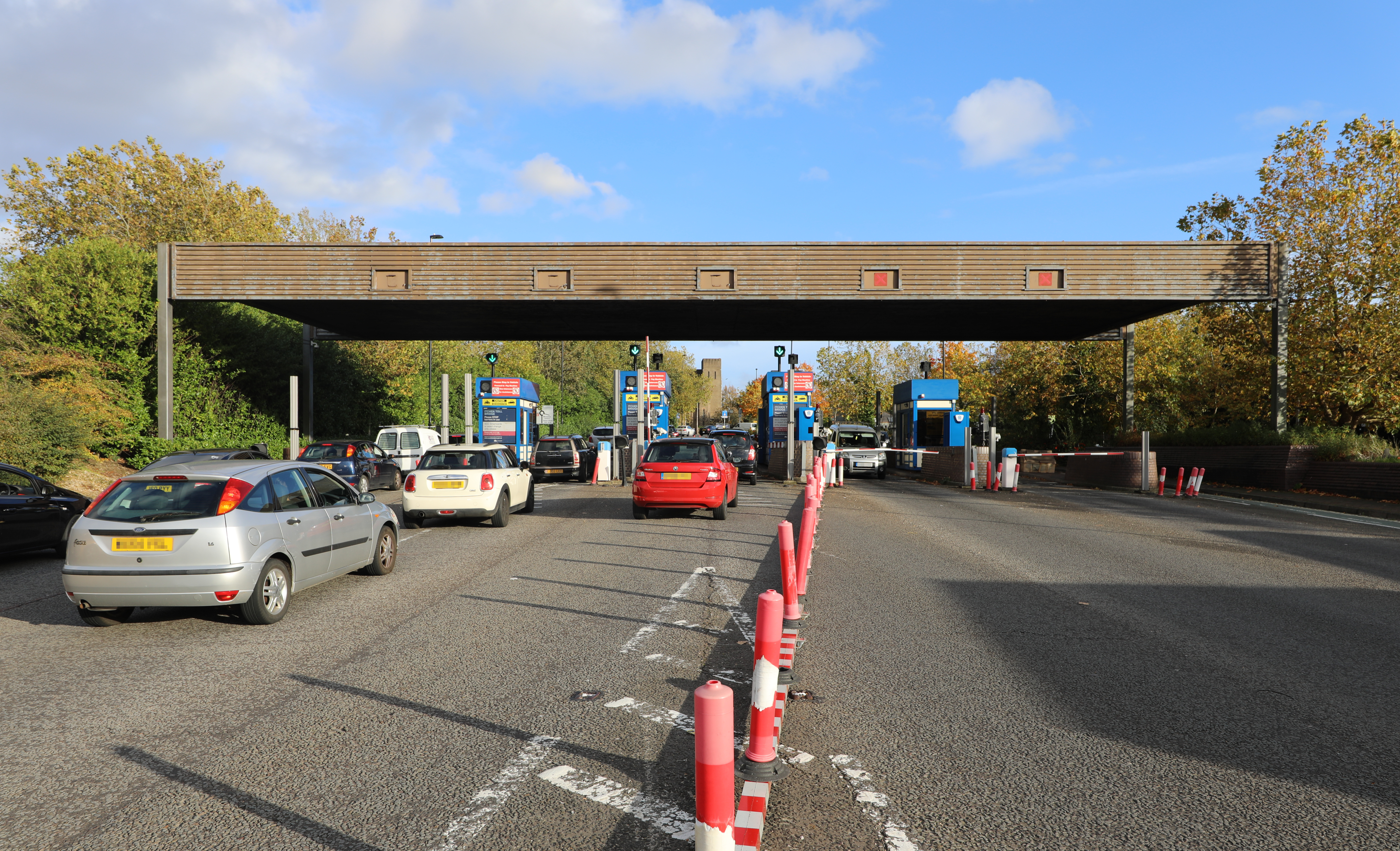
Itchen Bridge toll booths

At the Woolston end a toll booth operates daily. Southampton City Council levies a variable toll, depending on vehicle type and time of day of crossing. The original purposes of the toll were to help pay the £12.174 million it cost to build, and also to control traffic levels. The loans to pay for the bridge were paid off in 2016. In the early part of the 40-year period of the loan, a large part of the loan repayments was met from Southampton Council's general funds, but in later years the tolls delivered a surplus. The toll remains in place, to control the traffic in the areas surrounding the bridge and to cover the ongoing maintenance of the bridge. Surplus tolls, beyond what is needed for maintenance, go to general council funds.

There is a local myth that there was a promise to scrap the toll once the bridge had been paid for, but this is not the case.

On 21 December 2010, it was announced that an automatic toll system would replace the staffed booth, saving over £200,000 annually. This system measures the height of the front of the vehicle and number of front wheels to judge the applicable toll for that vehicle.

== See also ==
- Itchen ferry
- Woolston Floating Bridge

== Gallery ==
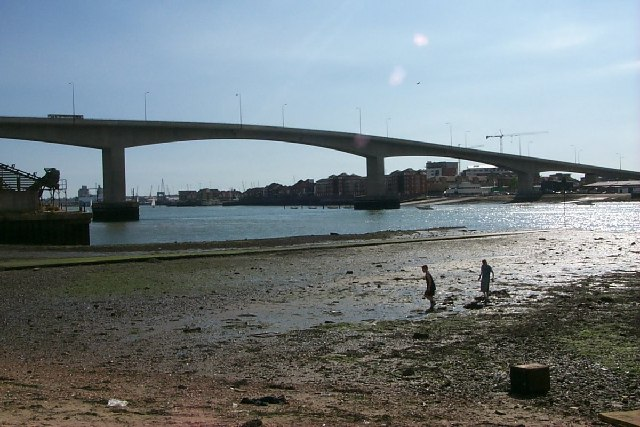
The Itchen Bridge taken from the site where the Supermarine works used to be

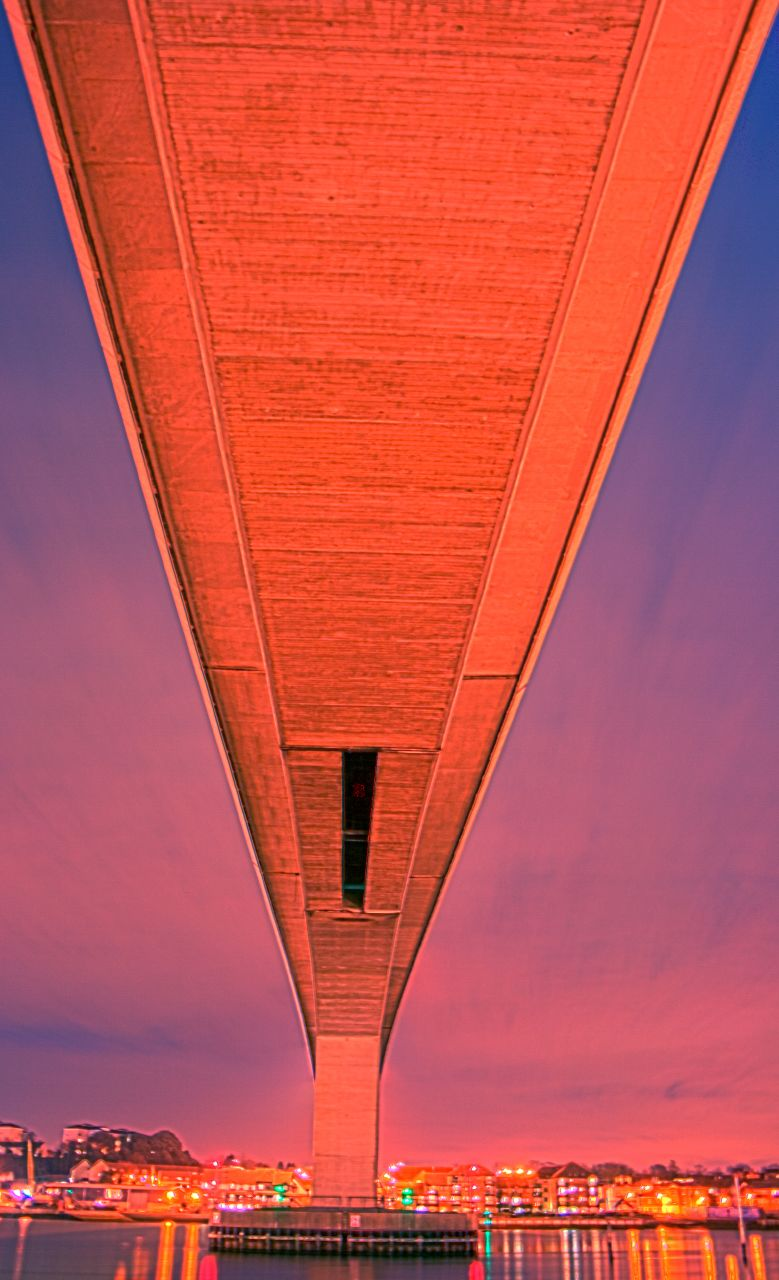
Under the Itchen Bridge

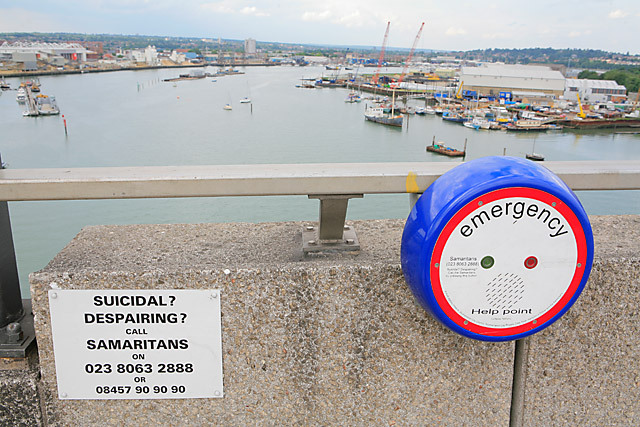
Samaritans notice and intercom on top of the Itchen Bridge

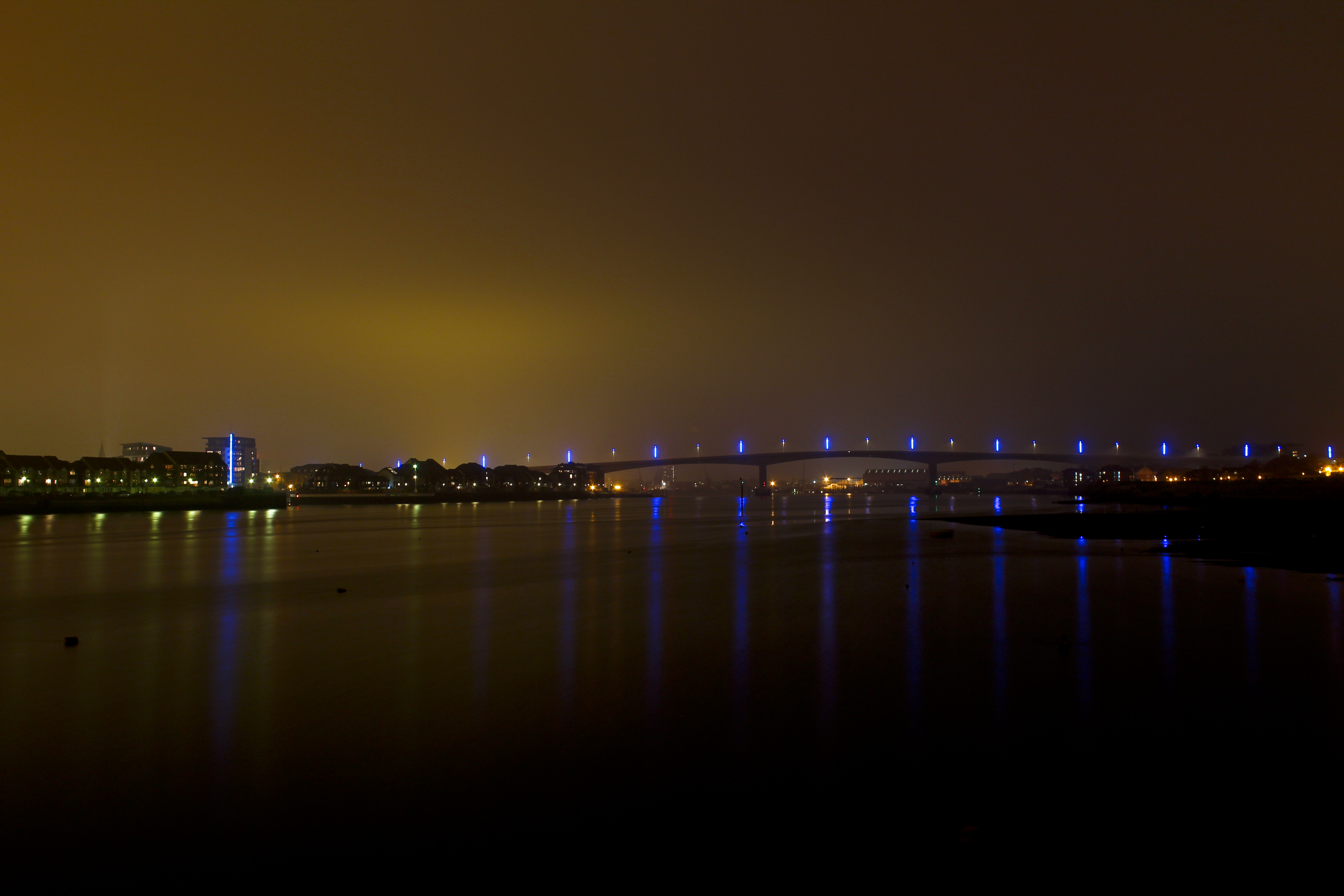
A shot of Itchen Bridge as seen from Woolston Jetty on a foggy evening

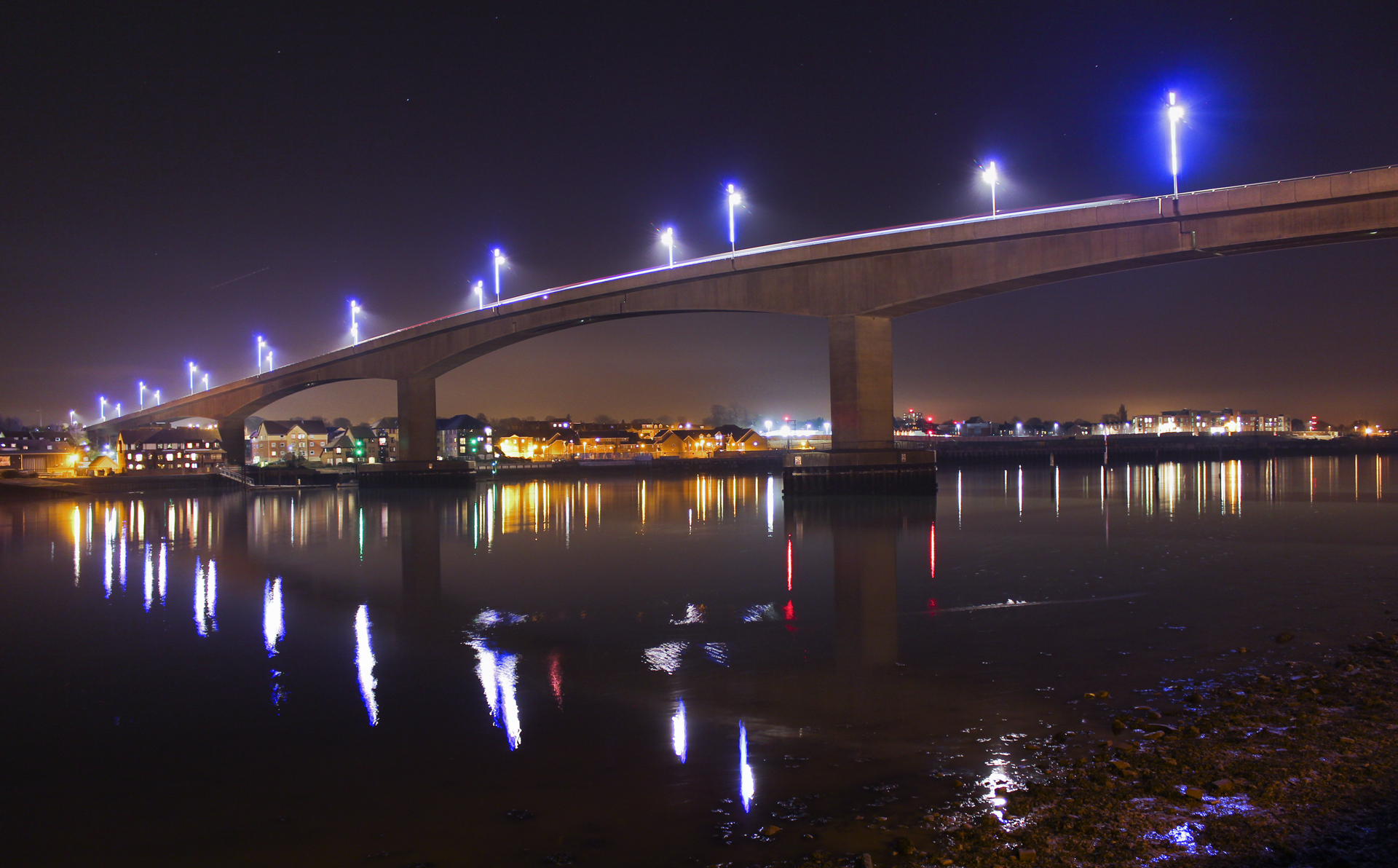
New lights over Itchen Bridge said to reduce power consumption by 20%
