= Hamble River H.L.1 Seaplane =

H.L.1 Seaplane
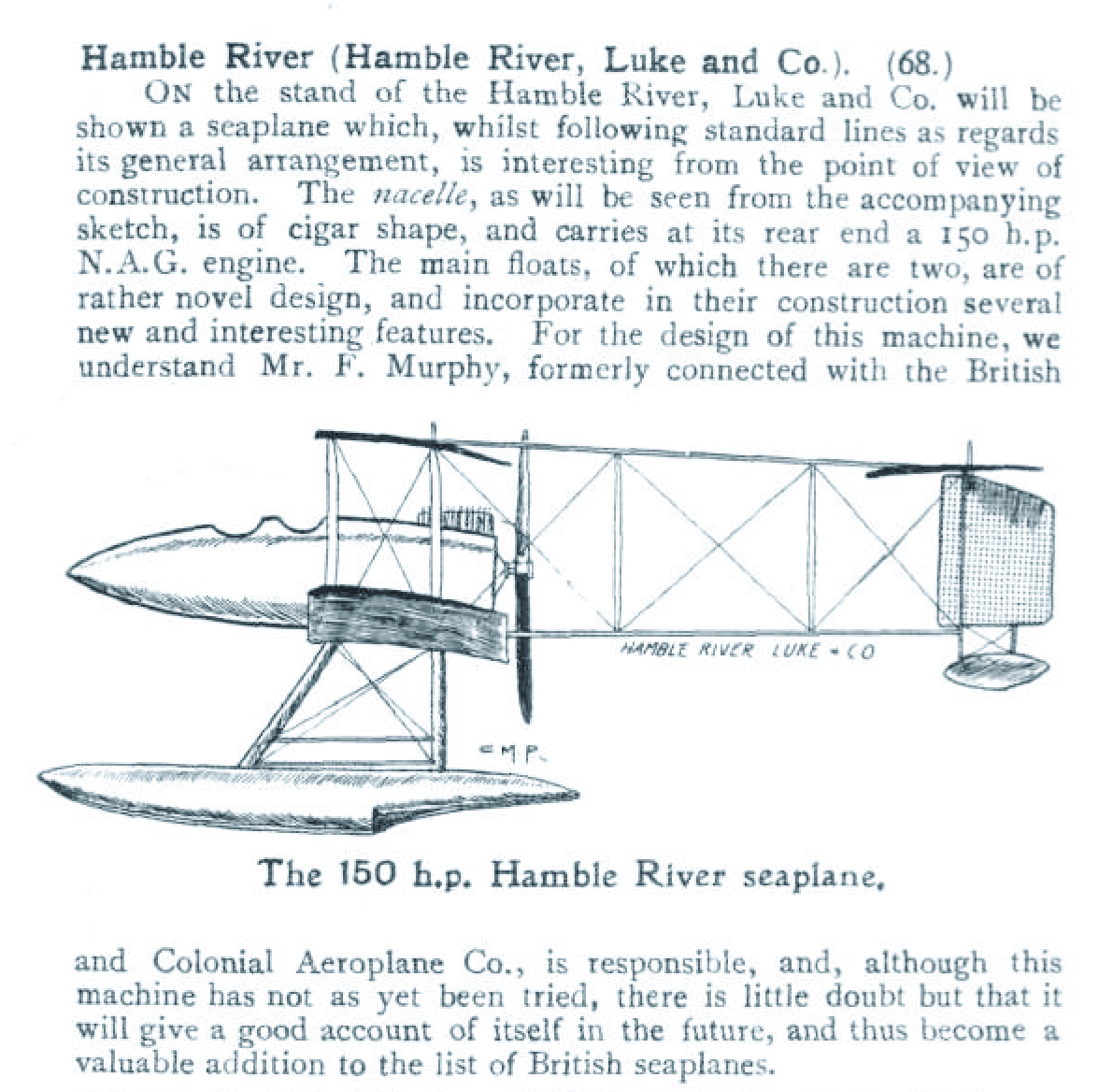

General information
- Type: Seaplane
- National origin: United Kingdom
- Manufacturer: Hamble River, Luke & Co Limited
- Designer: Frank Murphy
- Number built: 1

History
- First flight: 1914

The Hamble River H.L.1 Seaplane was a British pusher biplane seaplane designed by Frank Murphy and built by Hamble River, Luke & Co Limited at Southampton.

The H.L.1 was exhibited uncompleted at the exhibition at Olympia in February 1914 fitted with a 150 hp (112 kW) NAG C.II engine. It was ordered by the British Admiralty to be fitted with a 160 hp (119 kW) Gnome engine and issued with serial number 105. The H.B.1 was launched in May 1914 but partly sank and was damaged due to being unbalanced. It was repaired and fitted with pontoon-floats and tested by Eric Gordon England without much success. It was not accepted by the Navy and was sold at auction in May 1915 for £30.

== See also ==
Related lists

- List of flying boats and floatplanes
