= Royal Southern Yacht Club =

Yacht club in England

Coordinates: 50°51′N 01°19′W

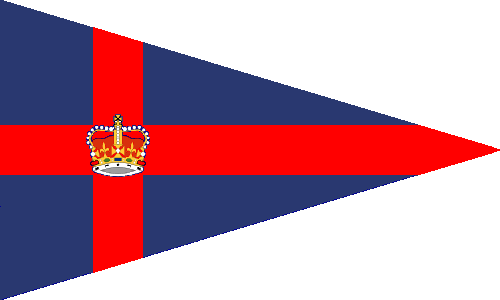
- Burgee

- Ensign
- Founded: 1837
- Location: Hamble, Hampshire, United Kingdom
- Website: http://www.royal-southern.co.uk

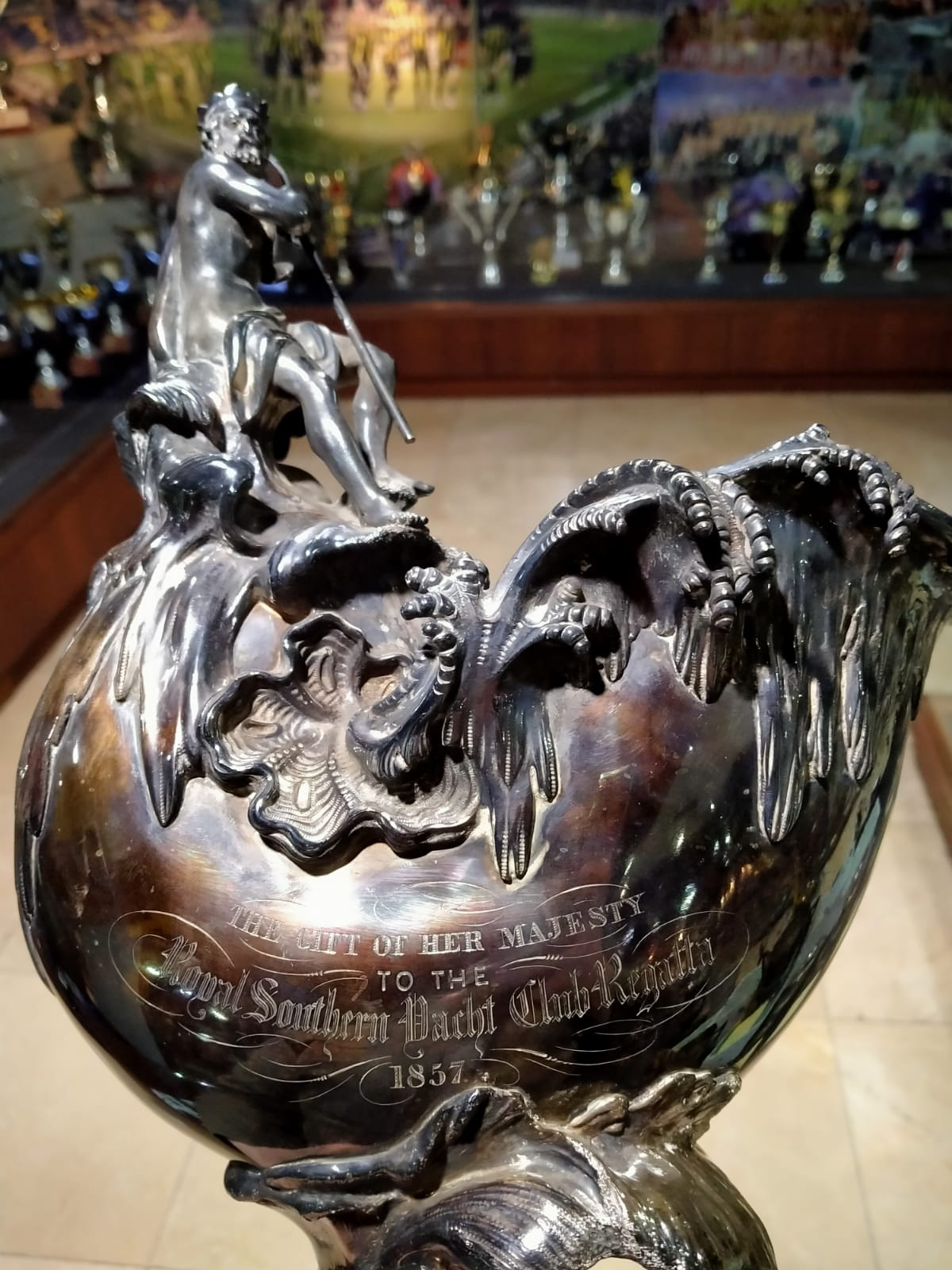
1857 Royal Southern Yacht Club Regatta Cup

The Royal Southern Yacht Club is a yacht club in Hamble-le-Rice, Hampshire, England.

== History ==
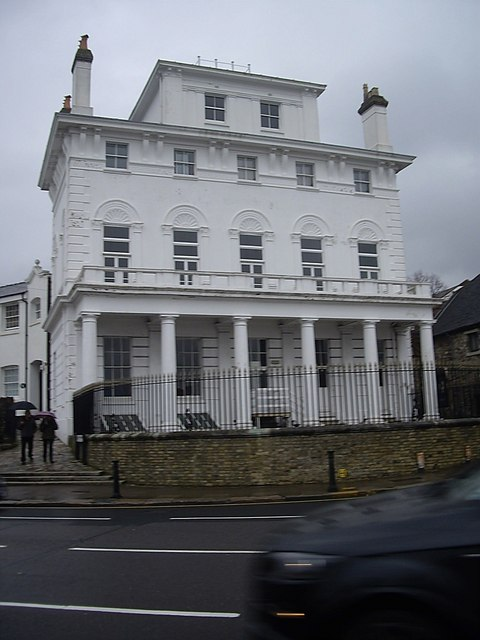
The original Royal Southern Yacht Club Club House

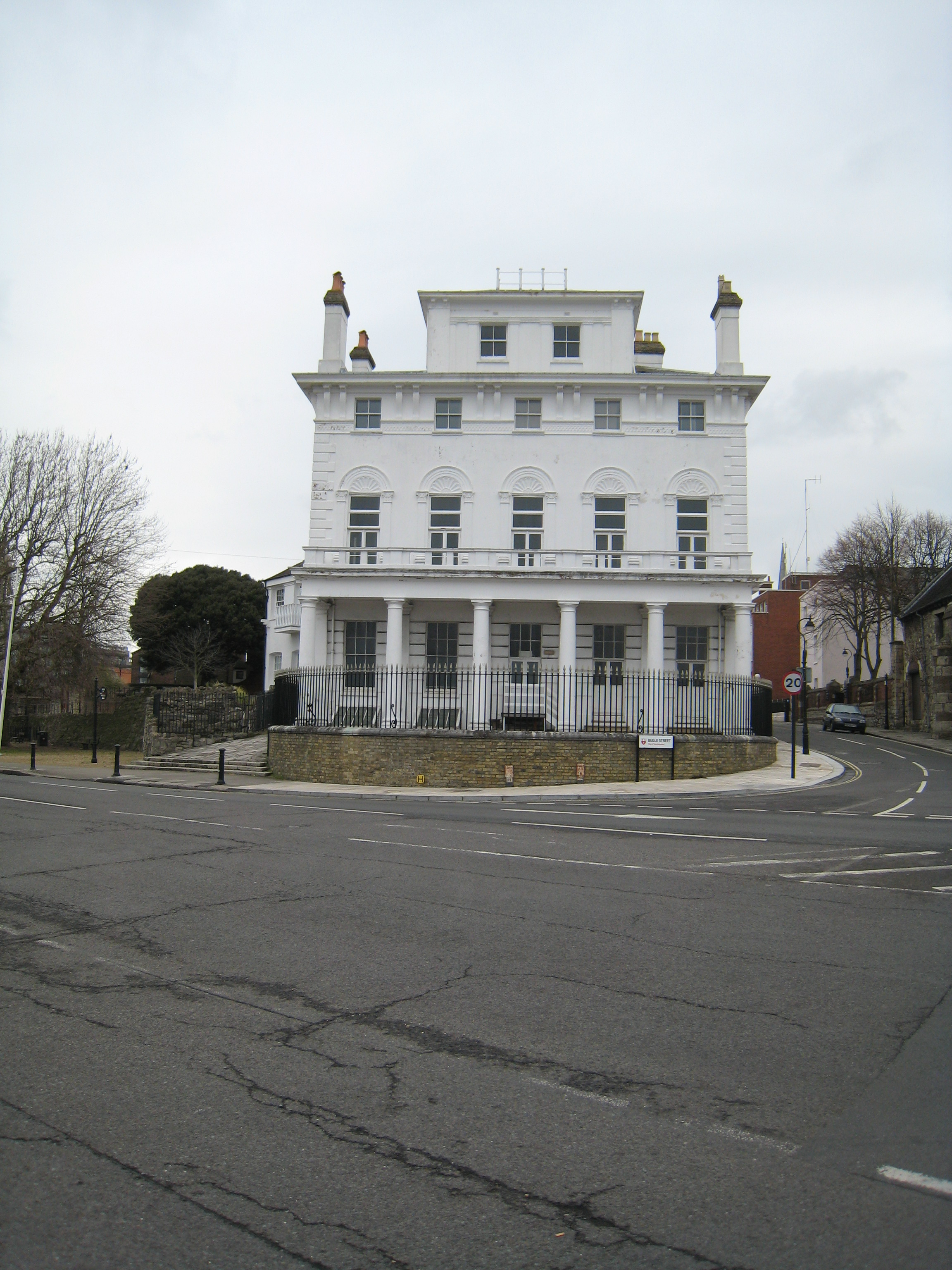
original Royal Southern Yacht Club Club House, 1 Bugle Street

It was established in 1837 in Southampton as the Royal Southampton Yacht Club and was given Royal patronage by Queen Victoria. The original Club House, which still stands opposite Southampton's Royal Pier, was built in 1846. Its archives record the annual regattas, the parlous state of its finances through most of the nineteenth century, and the issues of the time. In 1844 the club wanted to organize a large regatta, but having no funds in hand, it decided to increase the entrance fee and the remit of the club. This involved altering its name to "Royal Southern Yacht Club", its present denomination. In 1947, as Southampton Docks expanded commercially and its waters became less attractive for yachting, the club moved to south-east to Hamble, where it remains today.

== See also ==
- List of International Council of Yacht Clubs members
- Royal Southampton Yacht Club
