= Woolston Floating Bridge =

English cable ferry between Woolston and Southampton

Coordinates: 50°53′56″N 1°23′13″W

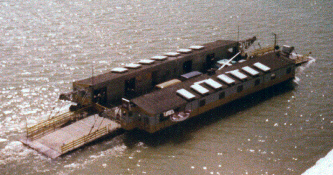
The Woolston Floating Bridge crossing the River Itchen shortly before it was taken out of service, seen from the Itchen Bridge, the concrete structure that replaced it

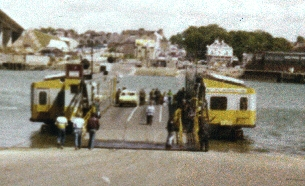
The Woolston Floating Bridge embarking passengers on the Southampton side of the River Itchen on its last day of service (11 June 1977)

The Woolston Floating Bridge was a cable ferry that crossed the River Itchen in England between hards at Woolston and Southampton from 23 November 1836 until 11 June 1977. It was taken out of service after the new Itchen Bridge was opened.

Initially there was one ferry, built and owned by the floating bridge company (the Itchen Bridge and Roads Company), increased to two operating side by side in 1881. In 1934 the company was sold to Southampton Corporation.

In the 1970s two diesel ferries operated side by side during the day with a single ferry late in the evening. There was a bus terminus at both hards on either side of the crossing, connecting foot passengers with the centre of Southampton and the city's south eastern suburbs. A maintenance slipway and cradle were built to the North of the Woolston hard to enable the ferries (or "bridges") to be hauled out of the water. The third (or spare) diesel ferry was often to be found moored off the wires on the Southampton side of the river to the North of the hard in later years.

== History ==
=== Planning stage ===
Itchen Bridge and Roads Act 1834
- Act of Parliament
- Parliament of the United Kingdom
- Long title: An Act for establishing a Floating Bridge over the River Itchen from or near a Place called Cross Bouse, within the Liberties of the Town of Southampton, to the opposite Shore in the County of Southampton, with proper Approaches thereto, and for making Roads to communicate therewith.
- Citation: 4 & 5 Will. 4. c. lxxxv

Dates
- Royal assent: 25 July 1834
Other legislation
Repealed by	Southampton Corporation Act 1973

Status: Repealed

Text of statute as originally enacted

The original plans were introduced in 1833 for a conventional bridge with a swivelling section in the middle. Opposition came from a number of sources including local fishermen and the Northam Bridge Company. An attempt to obtain an article of parliament for the bridge's construction was made in early 1834 but at this point the Admiralty voiced its objection arguing that the bridge would interfere with the navigation of the Itchen. The Admiralty suggested a steam driven floating bridge as an alternative and a revised bill was passed on 25 July as the Itchen Bridge and Roads Act 1834 (4 & 5 Will. 4. c. lxxxv) despite further opposition from the Northam Bridge Company.

== Construction ==
The initial bridge cost £5,945 and was built in Plymouth. A further £23,000 was spent on roads either side of the bridge.

=== Operation ===
Itchen Bridge and Roads Acts Amendment Act 1839
- Act of Parliament
- Parliament of the United Kingdom
- Long title: An Act for amending and enlarging the Powers of Acts for establishing a floating Bridge over the River Itchen near the Town of Southampton.
- Citation: 2 & 3 Vict. c. lxviii

Dates
- Royal assent: 4 July 1839
Other legislation
Repealed by	Southampton Corporation Act 1973

Status: Repealed

Text of statute as originally enacted

Southampton and Itchen Floating Bridge and Road Amendment Act 1851
- Act of Parliament
- Parliament of the United Kingdom
- Long title: An Act for amending and enlarging the Powers of the several Acts relating to "The Company of Proprietors of the Itchen Bridge and Roads."
- Citation: 14 & 15 Vict. c. cix

Dates
- Royal assent: 24 July 1851
Other legislation
Repealed by	Southampton Corporation Act 1931

Status: Repealed

Itchen Floating Bridge Act 1863
- Act of Parliament
- Parliament of the United Kingdom
- Long title: An Act for authorizing the Company of Proprietors of the Southampton and Itchen Floating Bridge and Roads to improve their present Works, and to establish a new Floating Jetty, and to raise further Monies; and for other Purposes.
- Citation: 26 & 27 Vict. c. cii

Dates
- Royal assent: 29 June 1863
Other legislation
Repealed by	Southampton Corporation Act 1973

Status: Repealed

Text of statute as originally enacted

Itchen Floating Bridge Act 1868
- Act of Parliament
- Parliament of the United Kingdom
- Long title: An Act to amend The Itchen Floating Bridge Act, 1863; and for other Purposes.
- Citation: 31 & 32 Vict. c. xc

Dates
- Royal assent: 13 July 1868
Other legislation
Repealed by	Southampton Corporation Act 1973

Status: Repealed

Text of statute as originally enacted

Itchen Floating Bridge Act 1872
- Act of Parliament
- Parliament of the United Kingdom
- Long title: An Act to amend the Acts relating to the Itchen Floating Bridge; and for other purposes.
- Citation: 35 & 36 Vict. c. xxxix

Dates
- Royal assent: 27 June 1872
Other legislation
Repealed by	Southampton Corporation Act 1973

Status: Repealed

Text of statute as originally enacted

The bridge began operation on 23 November 1836. It was largely reliant on long-distance travellers for profit since at the time few people lived on the east bank of the Itchen and those that did often qualified for toll exemptions. The Northam Bridge Company responded to the opening of the floating bridge by cutting its tolls and the floating bridge company initially suffered from poor financial performance. A new act of Parliament, the Itchen Bridge and Roads Acts Amendment Act 1839 (2 & 3 Vict. c. lxviii) was obtained, allowing the company to raise tolls and borrow 12,000. Competition from railways resulted in the company going bankrupt at the end of 1849 and bridge operations ceased.

A further act of Parliament, the Southampton and Itchen Floating Bridge and Road Amendment Act 1851 (14 & 15 Vict. c. cix) allowing the tolls to again be raised and the exemptions to be reduced resulted in the bridge returning to service. New railway lines resulted in further difficulties in the 1860s but these were largely resolved by the Itchen Floating Bridge Act 1868 (31 & 32 Vict. c. xc) that removed most of the remaining toll exemptions. In 1879 an additional set of chains were run across the river in order to support a pedestrian-only floating bridge. Traffic levels dropped again after 1929 when Southampton council purchased Northam bridge and made it toll free.

In 1934 Southampton council, having gained compulsory purchase powers from Parliament in the Southampton Corporation Act 1931 (21 & 22 Geo. 5. c. xcix), purchased the company at a price of £23,013 set at arbitration. A half-hourly overnight service was introduced in February 1937.

During World War II the bridges were under orders to cease operations during air raids but in practice they continued operating in some cases. Close to D-Day the sheer number of ships in Southampton meant the Hythe Ferry was unable to access its usual Southampton landing point and the floating bridges were used as landing stages.

The council stopped charging tolls for pedestrians and cyclists using the bridge in October 1946.

=== Replacement and closure ===
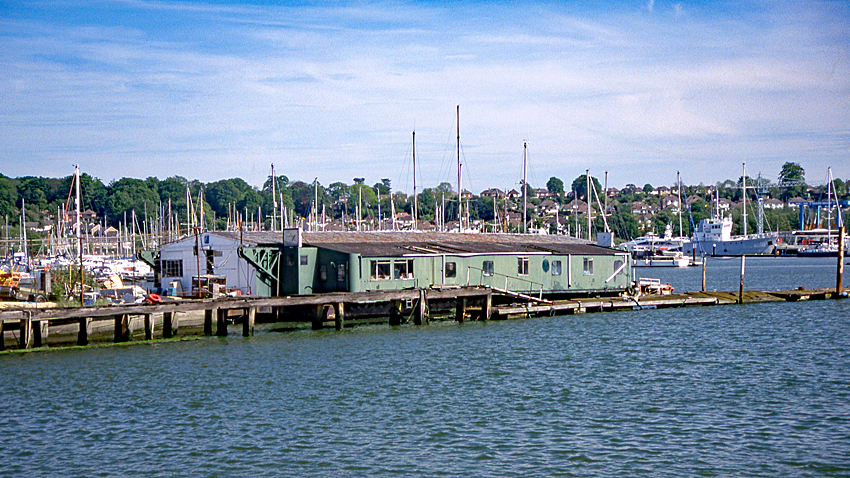
Woolston floating bridge at Kemps Quay marina used as offices and workshops, 2002

In 1970 a report prepared as part of the planning for the Itchen bridge it was noted that all the floating bridges would need to be replaced or undergo significant refits by 1980 in order to remain seaworthy. This among other factors pushed the city council to move towards constructing a fixed bridge. During the construction of the bridge the building works blocked the view of the ferry up the river so a watchtower had to be placed on the construction jetties to signal when ships were approaching from upstream.

The final public crossing by the ferries was a return trip on 11 June 1977 starting at 22:00. 500 passengers were carried on each ferry with special tickets including a glass of wine in specially inscribed glasses. After the return crossings had been completed fireworks were launched from the west bank of the Itchen. On 12 June a further crossing was made carrying Princess Alexandra as part of the naming ceremony for the new Itchen bridge.

== Technology ==
When introduced in 1838, it was a wooden-hulled chain ferry designed by engineer James Meadows Rendel. Initially there was one pair of chains across the river, both being used for propulsion. With the introduction of the lighter iron-hulled ferry No 2 in 1854, only the north chain was used for propulsion, the second chain being for guidance only.

In 1879 a pedestrian-only ferry was introduced, followed by a second in 1881 to service the growing workmen traffic heading for the Thornycroft shipyard just downstream from the crossing. This necessitated the installation of a second set of chains to allow both types of ferry to operate simultaneously.

In 1880 the ferry was still using chains, replaced by cables between 1878 and 1887. They are first seen in pictures of Floating Bridge No. 7, built in 1892 by Day, Summers and Co. Each rope weighed nearly 2 tons and had an average life of nine months in normal use. Each end was attached to a short length of chain that was connected to counterbalance weights housed in chain wells to maintain tension. As the ropes stretched with use, chain links were removed to compensate. The periodical "Engineering" carried a full description, including drawings, plans and sections, for Bridge Number 8 in the issue dated 26 November 1897.

Floating Bridge No. 11 and the two subsequent ferries were powered by diesel engines. The switch from steam to diesel meant it was possible to reduce the crew from three to two

Originally the ferries were lit by oil lamps. Ferry No 3 was fitted with gas lamps from new in 1862 but reverted to oil in 1869. In the early 20th century, electric lights were fitted to No 8, powered by a steam-driven dynamo, replaced by a Lister diesel in 1949.

== Ferries ==
Ferry	Builder	Service	Engines	Notes
1	Richard Hocking of Stonehouse	1836–1854	Two single-cylinder beam engines	Wooden-hulled craft with a central cabin containing the boiler and engines flanked by twin roadways. The latter had cross-battens to give horses a better footing.
2	Joseph Hodgkinson of Southampton	1854–1896	2-cylinder grasshopper engine	Iron-hulled craft with a central roadway with two side sponsons. The boiler was in one sponson and the engine in the other.
3	Joseph Hodgkinson of Southampton	1862–1900	2-cylinder grasshopper engine	On withdrawal, the hull, along with that of No 2, was used as the basis for a houseboat on the River Hamble
Woolston	Day, Summers & Co of Northam	1878–1883		A steam launch designed for pedestrian traffic. She proved to be unsuitable, with a number of accidents to passengers while boarding and disembarking.
5	Day, Summers & Co of Northam	1879–1901		A pedestrian-only ferry to cope with shipyard workers commuting to Thorneycroft's Woolston yard.
6	Day, Summers & Co of Northam	1881–1901		Sister to No 5
7	Day, Summers & Co of Northam	1892–1928	Triple expansion steam engine	Slightly smaller than the earlier carriage ferries. She sank on 8 March 1928 after a collision with the tug Fawley, but was salvaged. She was not used again and ended her days as a pontoon at the Supermarine works.
8	Day, Summers & Co of Northam	1896–1961	1 steam powered 2 cylinder compound Overhead grasshopper beam engine	Upon construction, a set of plans for this vessel appeared in Volume 63 of the periodical "Engineering" in the issue dated 26 November 1897. Declared unsafe for further service following a survey in 1961, she was sold to Kemp's yard at Bitterne Manor as a fuelling pontoon for the marina. The engines were removed and initially preserved at Wendron Forge in Cornwall, but are now in the care of Southampton City Council along with those from number 9. It served as a floating restaurant moored in the Elephant Boatyard at Bursledon as "The Ferry Restaurant" until 31 December 2019 – the last known surviving bridge. Currently, it serves as offices for the Elephant Boatyard. Future plans for this bridge are unknown.
9	Mordey Carney & Co of Woolston	1900–1964	1 steam powered 2 cylinder compound centre-pivot beam engine	Sold to Kemps yard on withdrawal, the engines were removed and initially preserved at Wendron Forge in Cornwall, but are now in the care of Southampton City Council along with those from number 8. She was due to be transferred to the Medway in 1974 but is believed to have sunk under tow off Selsey.
10	Day, Summers & Co of Northam	1928–1967	1 steam powered 2 cylinder compound centre-pivot beam engine	Built in a hurry to replace No 7, she was completed in under six months. The last steam-powered ferry, she also ended up at Kemp's yard where the upper works were removed ready for use as pontoon.
11	J I Thorneycroft of Woolston	1962–1977	2 159 hp Leyland Atlantean bus engines	First of three diesel powered bridges, distinguishable from the latter two by having open end areas. Beached on the north side of the Woolston hard after withdrawal, on the site of the maintenance slipway. Served as a bar and club, called Floaters, for some years until destroyed by fire in the late 1980s.
12	J I Thorneycroft of Woolston	1964–1977	2 159 hp Leyland Atlantean bus engines	
14	Vosper Thorneycroft at Portsmouth	1967–1977	2 159 hp Leyland Atlantean bus engines	One of the last two diesel bridges delivered, thought to be number 14, was converted to a floating workshop and office at Kemp's boatyard below Northam Bridge on the East bank of the River Itchen. By 2004 it was moored in a wet dock next to Belvidere Wharf on the West Bank. The superstructure had been removed to form a pontoon by 2007, and it finally disappeared at some time before 2012.

== Naming ==
The Floating Bridge was technically called the Woolston ferry. Floating bridge is an affectionate description of the technology rather than the name of the crossing. The term was first used by the engineer James Meadows Rendel, who had previously implemented a similar design of chain ferry at Torpoint in Cornwall and at Dartmouth in Devon. The same technology was applied to the Gosport Ferry in 1840 No variant of the ferry took the form of a pontoon bridge spanning the whole width of the crossing, to which the term Floating Bridge is more widely applied and thought of today.

The term 'floating bridge' has been commonly used in Southampton and it is still in use, more than 30 years after the ferry was taken out of service. The terminology was immortalised in the 1956 painting The Floating Bridge by L. S. Lowry, and is remembered in Floating Bridge Road which leads to the site of the Southampton Hard.

The term 'floating bridge' has also been applied to the Cowes Floating Bridge, which still provides a similar service in a similar situation just a few miles away, across the River Medina in Cowes on the Isle of Wight.

== Associated buildings ==
In 1820, whilst the crossing was still served by the small boats of Itchen Ferry village, a toll house was built. This became a Coffee Tavern when a ticket office was built for the ferry in 1836. The toll-house/Coffee Tavern building survived until 1970. The ticket office was demolished in 1954.

== Impact on the area ==
St Johns Road in Hedge End was constructed, starting in 1839, to serve the ferry. This project was initiated by four of the proprietors of the Floating Bridge company, including James Warner the Younger of Botley, Hampshire, and was undertaken at their own expense. There was competition between the ferry and the Northam Bridge, which at the time was a toll bridge. By building a road that linked the hamlet of Hedge End to the Portsmouth Road at Sholing, the proprietors of the Floating Bridge company were able to poach some of the passengers that would otherwise have used Northam Bridge. The road cut through Botley Common and Netley Common. The inevitable further development alongside the road further eroded the common land, and helped the hamlet of Hedge End to establish itself as a village in its own right.

== In popular culture ==
L.S.Lowry The artist visited Southampton when visiting his friend and fellow artist Hilda Margery Clarke and painted the bridge. The painting is now part of the collection in the Southampton Guildhall Art Gallery. A second painting remains in private hands.

"The Woolston Ferry" is a 1977 folk song, by Gutta Percha and the Balladeers. It includes the lyrics:

If you are ever up in Sholing and you want to go to town,

Don't go via Bitterne, that's the long way round,
Take a trip across the ferry, take a trip across the sea
and if you're pedestrian you can go for free.
Oh, the Woolston ferry, it doesn't travel very fast,

It was never built for comfort, it was built to last.

== The ferry today ==
Both the Southampton and Woolston hards have been redeveloped, and the last surviving significant artifacts of the Woolston Ferry are the engines of bridges 8 and 9, and the hull of Bridge Number 8. This is located in the Elephant Boatyard in Bursledon and served as the popular Ferry Restaurant on the River Hamble until 31 December 2019 when it closed down. The bridge still remains to this day as offices.

== See also ==
- Itchen Bridge
