= Itchen Ferry (village) =

Former hamlet in Hampshire, England, UK

- Former hamlet
- Interactive map of Itchen Ferry
- Absorbed into Southampton: 1920
- Luftwaffe bombings: 26 September 1940
- Named for: Itchen ferry

Itchen Ferry was a small hamlet on the east bank of the River Itchen in Hampshire. The village took its name from the small fishing boats that were also used to ferry foot passengers across the river.

== Location ==
An Ordnance Survey map of 1911 (NC/03/17894) shows the village to be situated in the area roughly bounded by Sea Road, Oakbank Road, the River Itchen and the railway line in modern Woolston, but also extending along Sea Road towards Peartree Green on the other side of the railway, which cut the village in half in 1866. Neighbouring streets on that same map, Defender Road, Britannia Road and Shamrock Road have a more structured layout and are clearly part of the Victorian enlargement of Woolston. The same map clearly shows the housing in Itchen Ferry village to have a more random layout. An even older map, of 1842 pins Itchen Ferry village more tightly to the area between Sea Road and Vicarage Road.

== History ==
Itchen ferrymen were granted permission to ferry passengers and goods across the River Itchen by the lords of the manors of Woolston and Southampton. Lords of the manor of Woolston were paid in cash. Lords of the manor of Southampton received free passage.

The village lost a large part of its livelihood when the Floating Bridge was introduced in 1836, but continued to operate a night service until the late 19th century. The inhabitants always remained fishermen and seafarers.

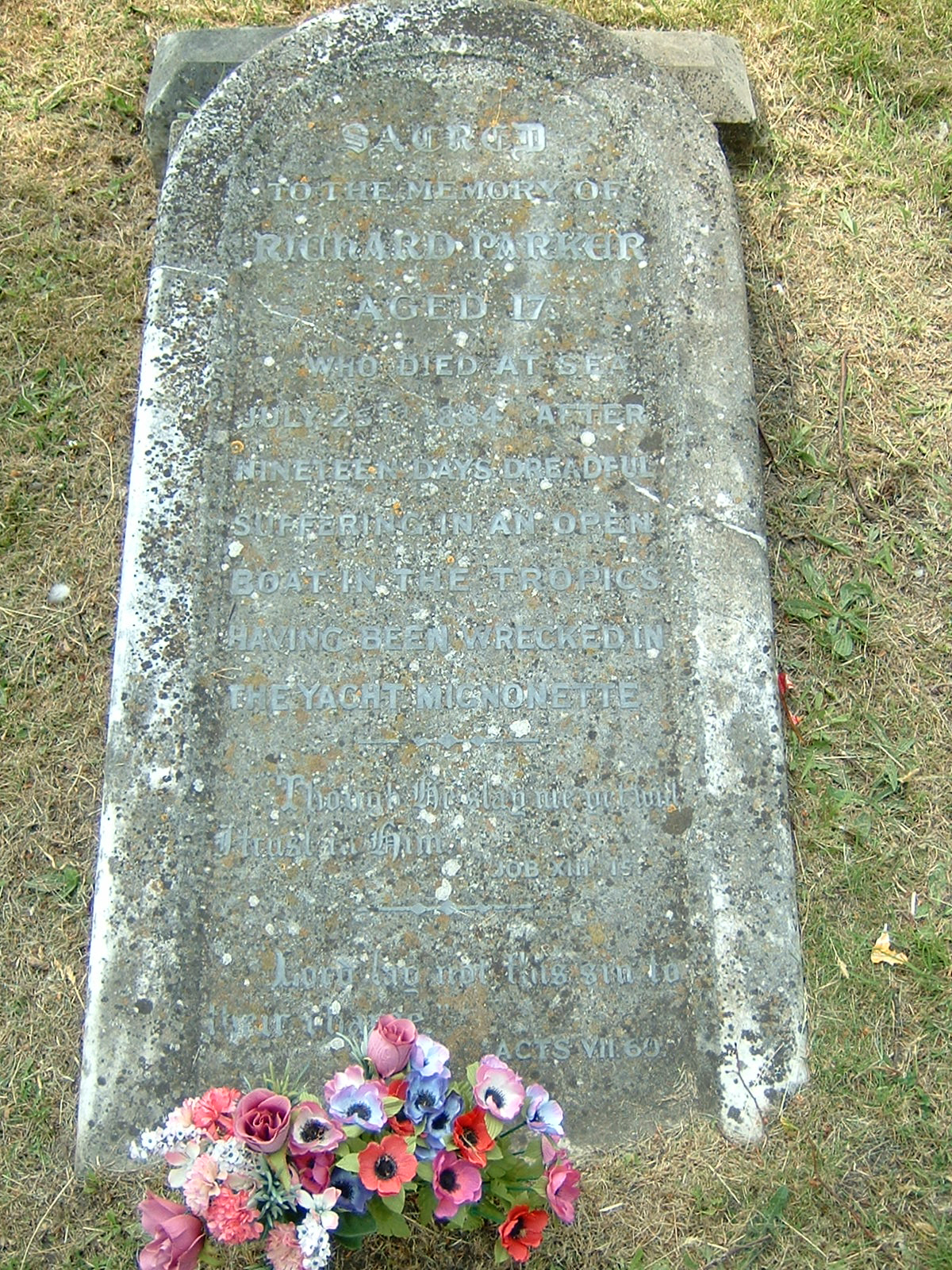
Richard Parker's tombstone

A memorial to Richard Parker of Itchen Ferry village can be seen in the graveyard of Jesus Chapel on Peartree Green. The desperate situation that led to his death in 1884 was the subject of a significant murder trial, Regina v. Dudley & Stephens, that changed English law.

=== World War II bombings ===
Already absorbed into its larger neighbour, Woolston, and subsequently into the borough of Southampton in 1920, it was destroyed beyond repair by the Luftwaffe on 26 September 1940 due to its misfortune of being a stone's throw from the Supermarine factory and a short distance up-river from the John I. Thornycroft & Company shipyard. There were over 100 casualties in this raid alone.

That was, however, not the only raid. The Luftwaffe had targeted the area on a number of previous occasions. An air raid shelter in the lower region of Sea Road near the railway line is reported as receiving a direct hit on 24 September 1940.

The area was subsequently used for training troops that would be fighting in similar ruined villages during the invasion of Europe in 1944.

==== Details of the bombing raids ====
- 24 September 1940 – 42 fatalities.
- 26 September 1940 – 55 fatalities, 49 seriously injured, 43 other casualties. This raid comprised the Heinkel He 111 bombers of Kampfgeschwader 55 escorted by the twin-engined Messerschmitt Bf 110 heavy fighters of Zerstörergeschwader 26, 160 aircraft in total dropping 145 high explosive bombs.

Reports of casualties in the direct hit on the air raid shelter (24 September) are contradictory. One report has approximately 100 fatalities and around 50 wounded, coincidentally the total of the two raids as listed above: it may have been politically expedient to combine those figures. Another source simply reports many fatalities. The most reliable report, because it is based on local sources in Southampton rather than RAF sources, is that the shelter was largely unoccupied because the air raid warning was late.

== Changes to street names ==
When Woolston was absorbed into Southampton in 1920, there were some duplicated street names. The following streets in the Itchen Ferry area were changed in 1924 to avoid the consequential confusion.

Current name	Previous name
Hazel Road	Elm Road
Laurel Road	Ivy Road
Sea Road	Hill Street
Tankerville Road	Britannia Road
Walpole Road	Avenue Road
Wharncliffe Road	Cliff Road

== See also ==
- Itchen ferry
