= Itchen ferry =

Type of watercraft

An Itchen Ferry is a type of small gaff rig cutter that was originally used for fishing in the Solent and surrounding waters and often raced in town regattas. Whilst there is no evidence to suggest one way or another, it has been said that the boats were also used to carry passengers across the River Itchen between Woolston and Southampton, prior to 1836.

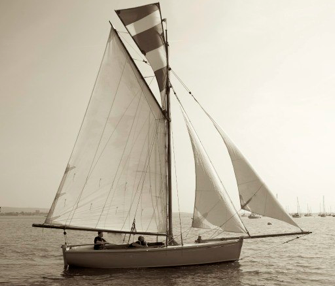
Nellie under sail in 2010 in Fareham Lake

The hamlet where the fishing boats originated was also named Itchen Ferry village.

The term "Itchen ferry" was also used to describe the Floating Bridge when it was introduced in 1836, to meet greater demand as Woolston expanded and became busier with the coming of the railways. The new type of Itchen ferry made the old boats redundant. Though they continued to be used for fishing, they were no longer required for ferrying passengers.

The hull design of the original Itchen Ferry boats was used by Drummond Bayne (Marine) Ltd, Southampton, to produce popular small yachts (approximately 22 and 25 feet overall) also known as an Itchen Ferry. Although production of these boats appears limited to the 1970s several of these practical craft remain in use.

== Original boats still afloat ==
- Nellie
- Wonder
- Fanny of Cowes
- Blue Jacket
- Sorella
