= Bevois =

Electoral ward in Southampton, England

Coordinates: 50.9194°N 1.3932°W

Bevois Ward
- Location within Southampton
- Area: 2.17 km^{2} (0.84 sq mi)
- Population: 16,844
  - Density: 7,762/km^{2} (20,100/sq mi)
- Unitary authority: Southampton
- Ceremonial county: Hampshire
- Region: South East
- Country: England
- Sovereign state: United Kingdom
- Post town: SOUTHAMPTON
- Postcode district: SO14
- Dialling code: 023
- Police: Hampshire and Isle of Wight
- Fire: Hampshire and Isle of Wight
- Ambulance: South Central
- UK Parliament: Southampton Test

Bevois (/ˈbiːvɪs/ BEE-vis) is an Electoral Ward in the Unitary Authority of Southampton, England comprising the suburbs Bevois Valley, Nicholstown and Northam, with a population of 16,844.

The ward is bounded by (clockwise from north) Portswood Ward, Bitterne Park Ward, Peartree Ward, Bargate Ward and Freemantle Ward.

The ward is part of the Southampton Test constituency.

== Origins ==
The ward was created by the Boundary Committee Review in 2002 out of parts of the old St Lukes Ward and Bargate Ward to the south. The name change was proposed by Southampton City Council and the Liberal Democrats, the latter arguing that “the conversion of St Lukes Church to a Sikh temple has removed the sole surviving landmark bearing the former ward name," and that the new name better reflected local community ties.

In contrast with St Lukes, the name Bevois has a strong attachment to the area, which contains landmarks such as Bevois Town Primary School and Church, and Bevois Castle Pub and Hotel. These landmarks, like the area, gleaned their names from the legend of Bevis of Hampton, who was said to have thrown up the mound of dirt that became Bevois Mount to obstruct the Danes in their endeavours to cross the River Itchen.

In the 2011 Census 39.2% of the population of Bevois Ward was born outside the UK.
