= Bargate (ward) =

Coordinates: 50.90°N 1.40°W

- Location within Southampton
- Area: 3.7 km^{2} (1.4 sq mi)
- Population: 20,926
  - Density: 5,656/km^{2} (14,650/sq mi)
- Unitary authority: Southampton
- Ceremonial county: Hampshire
- Region: South East
- Country: England
- Sovereign state: United Kingdom
- Post town: SOUTHAMPTON
- Postcode district: SO14
- Dialling code: 023
- Police: Hampshire and Isle of Wight
- Fire: Hampshire and Isle of Wight
- Ambulance: South Central
- UK Parliament: Southampton Itchen

Bargate is an electoral ward in Southampton, England. It covers Southampton City Centre, and stretches as far as Ocean Village and St Mary's to the east, and Westquay and The Polygon to the west. Bargate Ward had 18,762 residents in the 2011 Census, which had risen to an estimated 20,926 in mid 2015.

The ward takes its name from the Bargate, the northern gate of the old City Walls which still stands today, and is bounded by (clockwise from West) Freemantle Ward, Bevois Ward, Peartree Ward and Woolston Ward.

== Boundary changes ==
Under the Boundary Committee Review recommendations, implemented in 2002, Bargate Ward was reduced in size to deal with rapid population growth. In 1999 there had been 12,714 registered voters, and this figure was expected to rise to 14,025 by 2004. The boundary changes resulted in almost a quarter of its electorate being shifted to Bevois and Freemantle wards, making the adjusted electorate 9,746 in 1999, with a projected 10,801 in 2004.

As part of the size reduction, Southampton City Council had proposed that the ward be renamed Town Ward. The Labour Party suggested that “the name Bargate may be more appropriate", and with support from the Conservative Party, the original name stood.

== Parliamentary representation ==
From 1955 to 1983, Bargate ward fell under the Southampton Test constituency, since when it has been in the Southampton Itchen constituency.
