= Southampton City Council =

Local government body in England

- Council logo

Type
- Type: Unitary authority

Leadership
- Lord Mayor: Pat Evemy, Labour since 20 May 2026
- Leader: Sarah Bogle, Labour since 20 May 2026
- Chief Executive: Jillian Kay since April 2025

Structure
- Seats: 51 councillors
- Graph of the party split among 51 seats.
- Political groups: Administration (24) Labour (24) Other parties (27) Reform (8) Liberal Democrats (7) Conservative (6) Green (6)

Elections
- Voting system: First-past-the-post
- Last election: 7 May 2026
- Next election: 6 May 2027

Meeting place
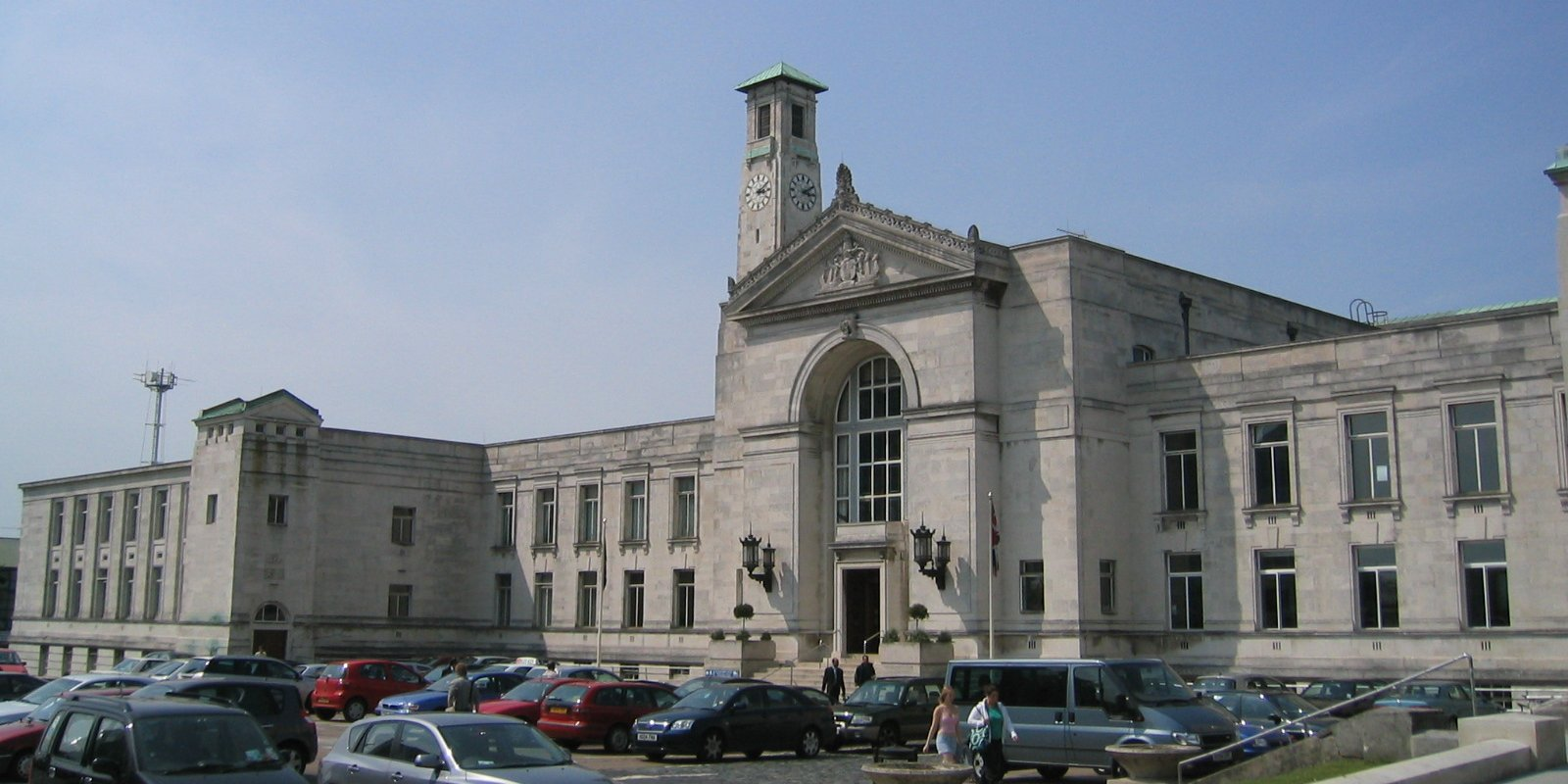
- Civic Centre, Civic Centre Road, Southampton, SO14 7LY

Website
- www.southampton.gov.uk

Southampton City Council is the local authority of the city of Southampton in the ceremonial county of Hampshire, England. Southampton has had a council since medieval times, which has been reformed on numerous occasions. Since 1997 the council has been a unitary authority, being a district council which also performs the functions of a county council; it is independent from Hampshire County Council.

The council has been under no overall control since the 2026 elections, being run by a Labour minority administration. It is based at Southampton Civic Centre.

In 2026, the council became a member of the Hampshire and the Solent Combined County Authority.

== History ==
The City of Southampton shown within Hampshire

Southampton was an ancient borough, with the earliest known borough charter dating from 1154. Southampton City Council has records in its archives of council meetings as early as 1199. The borough was led by a mayor from the 13th century. In 1447 the borough was given the right to appoint its own sheriff which made it a county corporate, removing it from the jurisdiction of the Sheriff of Hampshire.

In 1836, Southampton was reformed to become a municipal borough under the Municipal Corporations Act 1835, which standardised how most boroughs operated across the country. It was then governed by a body formally called the 'mayor, aldermen and burgesses of the borough of Southampton', generally known as the corporation, town council or borough council.

When elected county councils were established in 1889, Southampton was considered large enough for the existing borough council to also run county-level services, and so it was made a county borough, independent from the new Hampshire County Council. The borough boundaries were enlarged on several occasions.

The borough was granted city status on 11 February 1964, after which the corporation was also known as Southampton City Council.

Southampton was reconstituted as a non-metropolitan district in 1974 under the Local Government Act 1972. It kept the same boundaries (which had last been enlarged in 1967), but the council became a lower-tier district council, with Hampshire County Council providing services to the city for the first time.

In 1997, Southampton City Council regained responsibility for county-level services from Hampshire County Council as part of the 1990s UK local government reforms. The way this change was implemented was to create a new non-metropolitan county of Southampton covering the same area as the existing district, but with no separate county council; instead the existing city council took on county functions, making it a unitary authority. This therefore had the effect of restoring the city council to the powers it had held when Southampton was a county borough prior to 1974. Southampton remains part of the ceremonial county of Hampshire for the purposes of lieutenancy.

In 2022 the city's mayor was granted the additional honorific title of lord mayor following the Platinum Jubilee Civic Honours competition. The city council also continues to appoint a sheriff, although the role has lost its judicial functions. It is now a ceremonial position, serving as deputy to the lord mayor. Southampton is one of only fifteen towns and cities across England and Wales which retain the right to appoint their own sheriff.

In 2026, the council became a member of the Hampshire and the Solent Combined County Authority.

In March 2026, the government announced local government reorganisation plans, which would have seen the existing city council abolished in 2028 and local government across Hampshire reorganised into four unitary authorities. These proposals were withdrawn in September 2026.

== Powers and functions ==
The local authority derives its powers and functions from the Local Government Act 1972 and subsequent legislation. For the purposes of local government, Southampton is within a non-metropolitan area of England. As a unitary authority, Southampton City Council has the powers and functions of both a non-metropolitan county and district council combined. In its capacity as a district council it is a billing authority collecting Council Tax and business rates, it processes local planning applications, it is responsible for housing, waste collection and environmental health. In its capacity as a county council it is a local education authority, responsible for social services, libraries and waste disposal.

In August 2018 the council launched its own not-for-profit energy company 'CitizEn', created with the ambition to offer competitive rates for energy to tackle fuel poverty in the city. The company was set up in cooperation with Nottingham City Council’s company Robin Hood Energy. The scheme has since been sold to British Gas.

=== Local Authority Trading Company ===
In response to the 2008 financial crisis and the Great Recession the then city council, under the administration of the Conservative Party, began a process of privatisation of council services. From 2017 the Labour administration had begun a process taking municipal control of services that were privatised, so that all profits are reinvested into council services. These services were set up and the Southampton "Local Authority Trading Company" (LATCo) was created. Potential areas for the LATCo to cover include: street parking; public transport; adult and children’s transport; fleet services; housing management and operations; street cleansing; waste management; parks and open spaces; and facilities management.

In 2018 the council began the process of incorporating services which Capita had provided for the council for 11 years, including "customer services, HR pay, revenues and benefits, procurement, health and safety, print, post room and IT services". This also includes the incorporation of 300 jobs under the council's LATCo.

=== Joint Committees ===
Southampton had sent a representative to the South East England Regional Assembly during its existence between 1998 and 2010. Created by the Regional Development Agencies Act 1998 and based in Guildford, the voluntary assembly met six times a year and was responsible for the South East England Development Agency, a project which oversaw investment projects in the south east region. The council remains a member of the South East England Councils.

Solent Local Enterprise Partnership (LEP) is chaired by several businesses, universities and councils including Southampton City Council and primarily focuses on economic growth in the Hampshire region. The Solent LEP's Growth Hub is based in Southampton. There was an ambition to create a combined authority for the South Hampshire area, including Southampton, Portsmouth and the Isle of Wight which would include the potential for a combined authority mayor. This program was controversial, and was finally blocked by Hampshire County Council in 2017. There continues to be interest in partnership between Southampton City Council, Eastleigh Borough Council and neighbouring components of other Hampshire districts (New Forest District Council and Test Valley Borough Council).

Southampton City Council is also a founding member of the 'Key Cities' group. It is a lobbying group of 24 other cities across Great Britain, formed in 2013, that lobbies the government for greater devolution and funding

== Political control ==
The council has been under no overall control since the 2026 elections. Labour is the largest party and runs the council as a minority administration.

Political control of the council since the 1974 reforms has been as follows:

Lower-tier non-metropolitan district

Party in control	Years
Labour	1974–1976
Conservative	1976–1984
Labour	1984–1987
No overall control	1987–1988
Labour	1988–1997

Unitary authority

Party in control	Years
Labour	1997–2000
No overall control	2000–2008
Conservative	2008–2012
Labour	2012–2021
Conservative	2021–2022
Labour	2022–2026
No overall control	2026–present

=== Leadership ===
The role of Lord Mayor is largely ceremonial in Southampton, with a different councillor usually being appointed to the role each year. Political leadership is instead provided by the leader of the council. The leaders since 1996 have been:

Councillor	Party	From	To
John Arnold	Labour	1996	1999
June Bridle	Labour	1999	2003
Adrian Vinson	Liberal Democrats	2003	May 2007
Alec Samuels	Conservative	16 May 2007	20 February 2008
June Bridle	Labour	20 February 2008	May 2008
Alec Samuels	Conservative	14 May 2008	Jul 2010
Royston Smith	Conservative	14 July 2010	May 2012
Richard Williams	Labour	16 May 2012	25 April 2013
Jacqui Rayment	Labour	25 April 2013	15 May 2013
Simon Letts	Labour	15 May 2013	May 2018
Christopher Hammond	Labour	16 May 2018	May 2021
Daniel Fitzhenry	Conservative	19 May 2021	May 2022
Satvir Kaur	Labour	18 May 2022	20 December 2023
Lorna Fielker	Labour	3 January 2024	17 July 2025
Alex Winning	Labour	17 July 2025	May 2026
Sarah Bogle	Labour	20 May 2026	

=== Composition ===
Following the 2026 election the composition of the council was:

Party	Councillors
Labour	24
Reform	8
Liberal Democrats	7
Conservative	6
Green	6
Total	51

== Elections ==
Since the last boundary changes in 2023, the council comprises 51 councillors representing 17 wards, with three councillors being elected for each ward. Elections are held three years out of every four, with a third of the council (one councillor for each ward) elected each time for a four-year term of office. The wards are:

- Banister and Polygon
- Bargate
- Bassett
- Bevois
- Bitterne Park
- Coxford
- Freemantle
- Harefield
- Millbrook
- Peartree
- Portswood
- Redbridge
- Shirley
- Sholing
- Swaythling
- Thornhill
- Woolston

== Premises ==
The council is based at the Civic Centre, which was purpose-built for the council in phases between 1928 and 1939.

== Arms ==
Coat of arms of Southampton City Council
Granted 4 August 1575
