= St Denys =

Coordinates: 50.925°N 1.384°W

- Location within Southampton
- Unitary authority: Southampton
- Ceremonial county: Hampshire
- Region: South East
- Country: England
- Sovereign state: United Kingdom
- Post town: SOUTHAMPTON
- Postcode district: SO17
- Dialling code: 023
- Police: Hampshire and Isle of Wight
- Fire: Hampshire and Isle of Wight
- Ambulance: South Central
- UK Parliament: Southampton Test

St Denys is a partially riverside district of Southampton, England, centred 1.5 miles (2.4 km) north north-east of the city centre facing variously Bitterne Park and quay across the River Itchen estuary. The river is here spanned in the mid-east extreme of the district by Cobden Bridge, one of five within the city's broad boundaries, six including the railway bridge 100 m south. It is separated from the city centre by the districts sometimes known as Bevois Valley and New Town, in turn and to the south a riverside boardwalk allows pedestrian and bicycle access to the Mount Pleasant Industrial Estate and Northam.

== History ==
The far south has evidence of a Roman river jetty or possible crossing to Clausentum on the east of the river, and certain finds of other Roman archaeology.

The area is named after the 12th-century St. Denys Priory, of minor wealth and size, of which little remains, aside from an archway of the original chapel spanning two back gardens, and a counterpart moved to beside the rear wall of King John's Palace at Tudor House Museum in the city centre.

St Denys consisted of a very small hamlet nucleus and scattered farms throughout the medieval period. Drains and dykes improved the land for habitation and crop agriculture over many centuries.

=== 19th century and later ===
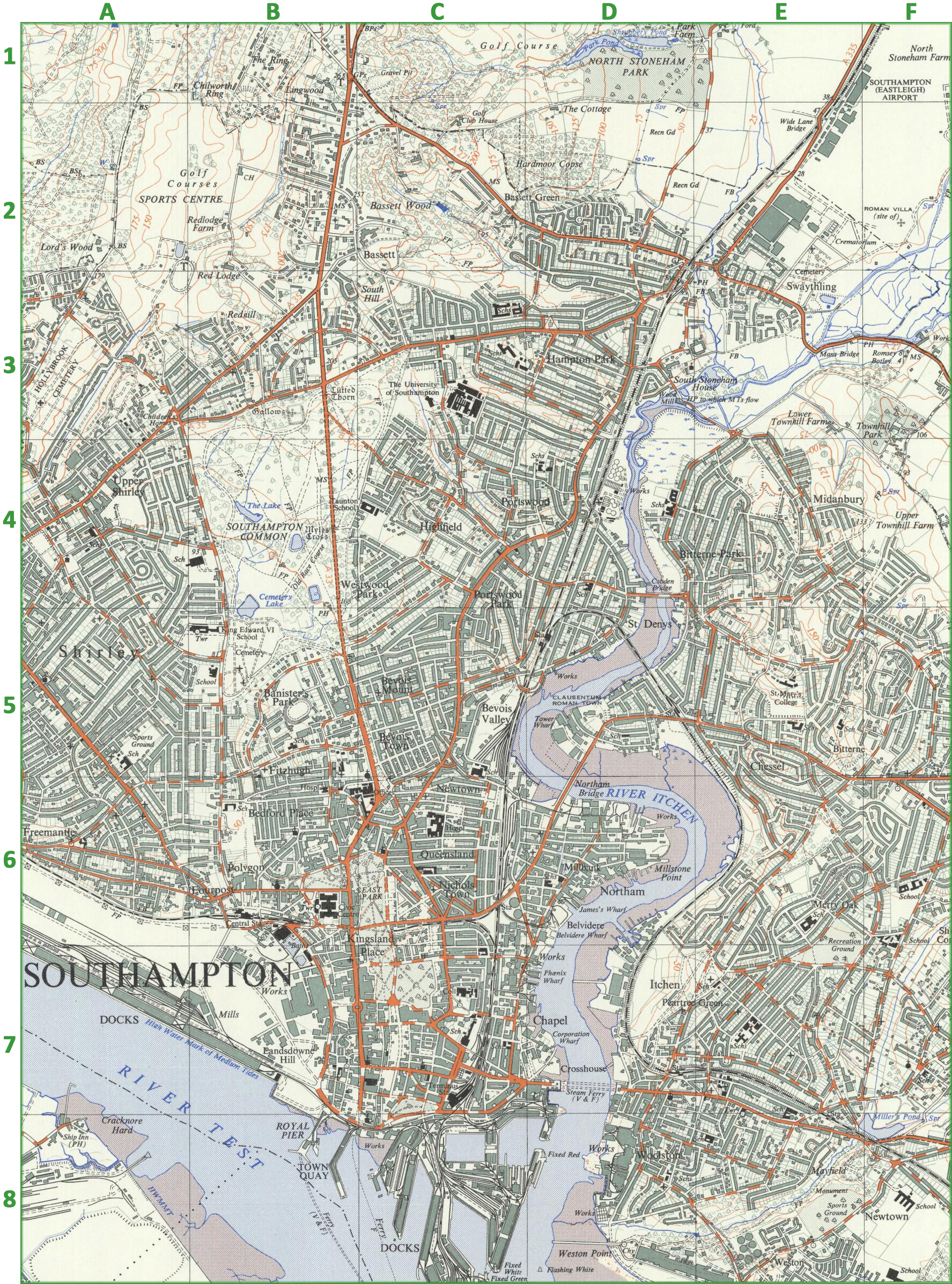
Extract from Ordnance Survey Map of 1941

The land here was extensively developed at low-rise level from the mid-19th century to the early 20th century; by 1895 it had a quite dense grid of streets which preceded most of the larger area west of the north-south railway line, namely Portswood, apart from its main road.

An iron railway bridge crossing the River Itchen opened in 1866, connecting St Denys railway station (named Portswood Station at the time) to Netley Hospital, via Bitterne and Woolston. This was followed in 1883 by the first Cobden Bridge.

A history of large laundries provided employment, servicing Southampton's ocean liners until the late 20th century. A number of homes of Titanic (sank 1912) victims and survivors are in St Denys. Considerable bombing in the Southampton Blitz due to proximity to the railway connecting London and docks.

== Demography ==
The area is populated with a wide mix of younger working families, older residents and students.

A small community of houseboats is moored along the easterly border, the waterfront, conversions from World War II motor torpedo boats.

== Landmarks ==
=== St Denys Church ===
The church was built in 1868, designed by George Gilbert Scott and is a listed building in the initial category; the parish dates from the previous year, its patron is and remains the Bishop of Winchester. The stained glass windows have been restored, and the congregation of the early 21st century holds events in church rooms and gardens.

=== St Denys Primary School ===
Originally built in the Victorian era for approximately 900 pupils, St Denys Primary School, located opposite St Denys Church on Dundee Road, is now a Foundation school serving up to 210 pupils aged between 4 and 11.

== Industry ==
The area is bounded in part by the Portswood Waste Water Treatment Works built on former salt meadows and now owned by Southern Water, supplementing another for the west side of the city.

In recent years part of the Waste Water Treatment Works estate was converted into industrial units and the area is bounded to the south west by the Empress Road industrial estate.

Dyer Bros Boatyard is located to the southwest of Cobden Bridge and has provided marine services from this location since 1903, prior to the construction of the existing Cobden Bridge.

== Boundaries ==
Church parishes and local government ward(s) history

St Denys is bounded by the estuary (east and south), a mainline railway (west), the far side of buildings on the north side of the start of Kent Road (north) and the A335 bypass, which when built in the late 20th century meant removing part of the original parish. Today the area is roughly equivalent to a third of the ward of Portswood; it remains a whole ecclesiastical parish in the Church of England. In the Catholic Church it is grouped with Portswood to the north into a parish.

== Public Transport & Active Travel Zone ==
The area is connected by a minor passenger stop on the site of a junction with the coastal line to Portsmouth or Brighton of the South West Main Line. The area is connected by a high-frequency timetable of buses to Southampton city centre, including its railway station, where the mainline continues to Weymouth and has dedicated parking bays in the surrounding streets for a Scooter-sharing system, currently provided by Voi

Between 2020 and 2023 the area received investment in measures to improve the safety and promote the use of Active Travel through the St Denys Active Travel Zone (ATZ) scheme.

== Arts, Culture & Recreation ==
The grassroots All Aboard Festival has taken place annually since 2019, showcasing local musical acts and visual artists in various locations throughout St Denys including some performances taking place on pontoons and vessels on the River Itchen itself.

The proximity to the river affords easy access for popular water pursuits such as sailing and paddle boarding. St Denys Boat Club was founded in 1889 originally using Dyer Bros. Boatyard before relocating to its own premises to the north west of Cobden Bridge. Boats can also be launched at high tide from the public hard located to the south of Priory Road.

There are a number of small parks within St Denys and the St Denys Community Centre has an outdoor court which can be used for football or other ball games.

== Notable residents ==
Major General Daniel Beak, a recipient of the Victoria Cross, attended St Denys School prior to graduating to Tauntons Grammar School in Southampton.

The singer, songwriter and model Foxes lived in the area and attended St Denys Primary School in her early life.

== Gallery ==
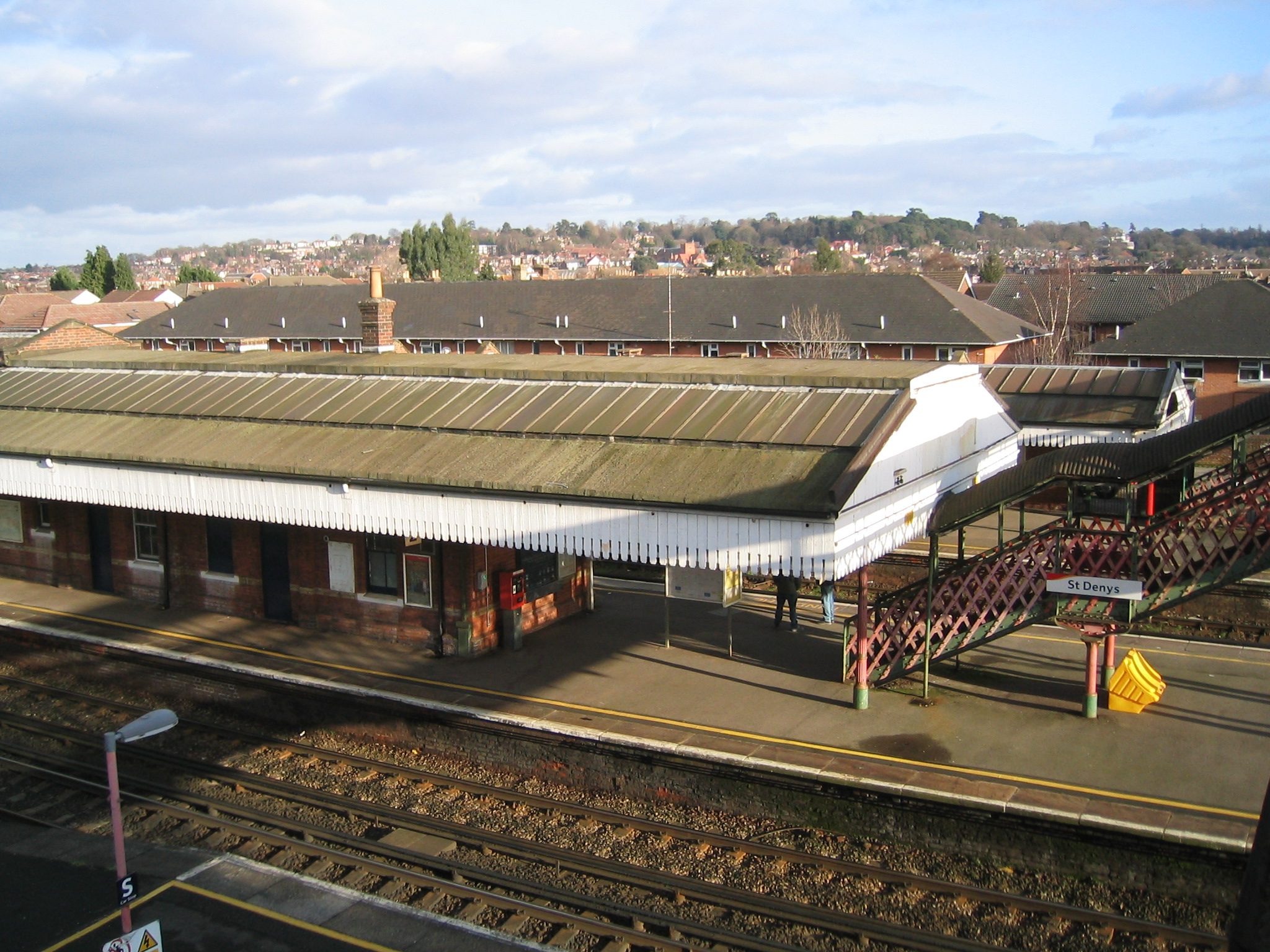
St Denys railway station platforms, canopies and homes and gardens in the hilly western part of Portswood and Bevois Mount beyond

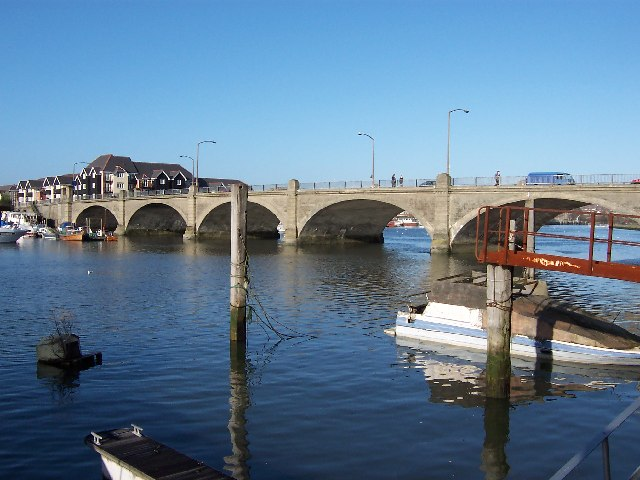
Six large arches of Cobden Bridge across the sky-reflecting estuary of the chalkland-fed Itchen
