= James Budden =

English cricketer

Personal information
- Full name: James Thomas William Frederick Budden
- Born: 25 July 1882; Bevois Town, Southampton, Hampshire, England
- Died: 5 September 1965 (aged 83); St Denys, Southampton, Hampshire, England

Domestic team information
- Years: Team
- 1912: Hampshire

Career statistics
Competition	FC
Matches	1
Runs scored	–
Batting average	–
100s/50s	–/–
Top score	–
Balls bowled	72
Wickets	–
Bowling average	–
5 wickets in innings	–
10 wickets in match	–
Best bowling	–
Catches/stumpings	1/–
- Source: Cricinfo, 14 January 2010

James Thomas William Frederick Budden (25 July 1882 – 5 September 1965) was an English cricketer.

Budden represented Hampshire in a single first-class match in 1904 against Oxford University. Budden was not required to bat in the match and bowled twelve wicketless overs.

Budden died at St Denys, Southampton, Hampshire on 5 September 1965.
