= Nicholstown =

Suburb of Southampton, England

Coordinates: 50.91133°N 1.39551°W

Nicholstown-Newtown
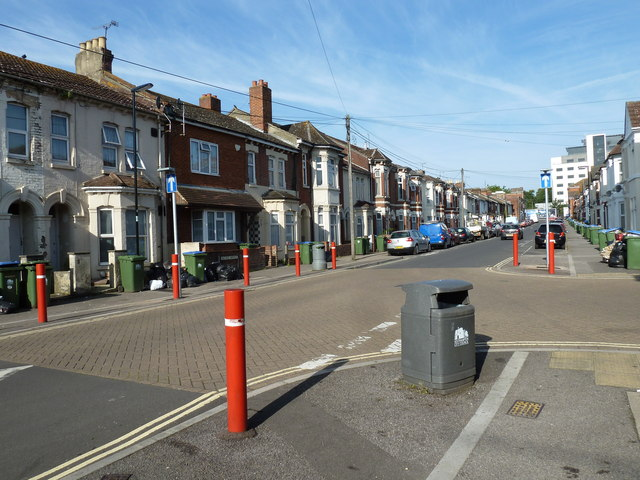
- Junction of Oxford and Exmoor Roads

- Location within Southampton
- Unitary authority: Southampton
- Ceremonial county: Hampshire
- Region: South East
- Country: England
- Sovereign state: United Kingdom
- Post town: SOUTHAMPTON
- Postcode district: SO14
- Dialling code: 023
- Police: Hampshire and Isle of Wight
- Fire: Hampshire and Isle of Wight
- Ambulance: South Central
- UK Parliament: Southampton Test

Nicholstown-Newtown (usually called Nicholstown or Newtown) is a small area to the north-east of Southampton's city centre. To the north is Bevois Valley, to the east Northam and to the west and south is St Mary's. In the north of Newtown is the Mount Pleasant area, which spills over into the north of Northam. Black signs saying "Welcome to Nicholstown-Newtown" demarcate the district on the roads running east from St. Mary's Rd – hence the district is bordered on the west by St. Mary's Road, the south by Six Dials road, and the east by the railway lines.

The area is formed of residential streets with a typical parade of small shops and services; the exception is its central feature, Royal South Hampshire Hospital, established in 1843–1844.

== History ==
The Church of St Luke was constructed in Newtown in 1853 using a gift of land and money from Thomas Chamberlayne. In 1918 the area elected Southampton's first female Councilor Lucia Foster Welch.

In the 1960s and 1970s, the area was notorious as Southampton's red-light district with high crime rates. Frustrated with the inaction of the city council and police, over 2,000 people marched from Derby Road to the civic centre. Following this "march of neglect", the Queen visited the area and a cash injection of half a million pounds followed. However, by the 21st century, little had changed. In the year 2000 a report highlighted that the urban renewal area encompassing Nicholstown "exhibits both the highest levels of unfitness and disrepair ... in the city" and the area was still very much a red light district in 2004.

Newtown Youth Centre in Graham Road (also known as Boyzy or NYC) was intended to be permanently cut on budgetary cuts in Spring 2014, providing a wide range of facilities, skills and activities to older and young people. It re-opened for the younger generations under the YMCA in Autumn 2014

The area was the subject of a controversial documentary in 2015, Immigration Street, a sequel to Channel 4's series Benefits Street based in Birmingham.
