= Northam railway station (Hampshire) =

Former railway station in Southampton, England

Northam
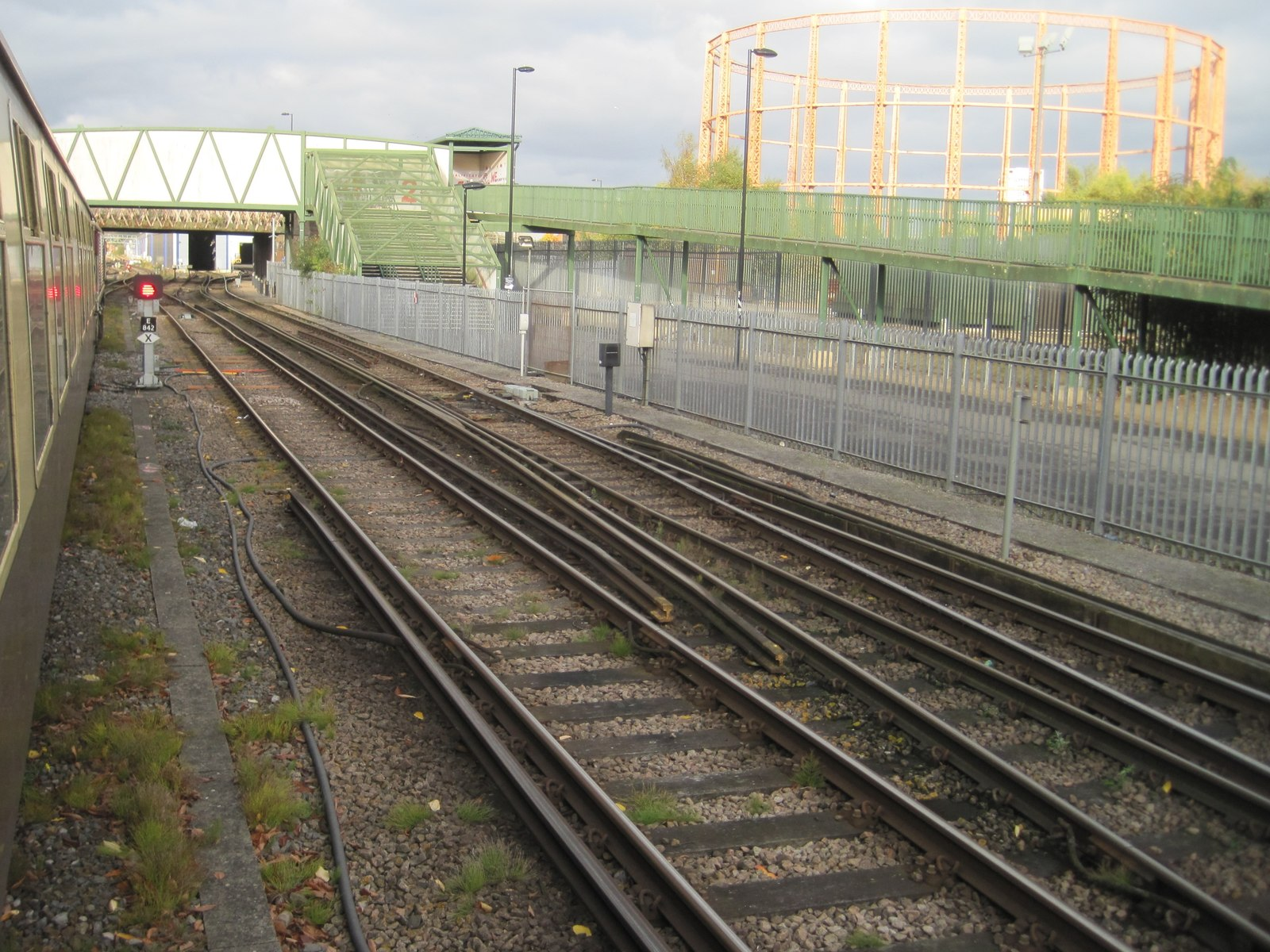
- The site of the station in 2016

General information
- Location: Northam, City of Southampton; England
- Coordinates: 50.9068°N 1.3923°W
- Grid reference: SU428121
- Platforms: 2

Other information
- Status: Disused

History
- Original company: London and South Western Railway
- Pre-grouping: London and South Western Railway
- Post-grouping: Southern Railway

Key dates
- 10 June 1839: first station opened as Northam Road
- 11 May 1840: Closed
- 1 December 1872: second station on different site opened as Northam
- 5 September 1966: Closed
Location

Northam railway station served the suburb of Northam in Southampton, England.

== History ==
The London and Southampton Railway (L&SR) was opened in stages. Most of the portion south of Winchester was opened on 10 June 1839, to a temporary terminus in Southampton called Northam Road. Not long before the opening, on 4 June 1839, the L&SR was renamed the London and South Western Railway (LSWR). The temporary station was closed when the line was completed and the permanent Southampton Terminus was opened on 11 May 1840.

The need to open a temporary station at Northam Road arose because of a dispute during construction of the line. There was a disagreement between the L&SR and the Northam Bridge Company (NBC), owners of the Northam Bridge, concerning how the railway would cross Northam Road, which connected the bridge with the centre of Southampton. The plans for the railway specified that there would be a level crossing, but the NBC requested that the Northam Road be carried over the railway on a bridge. The NBC began legal proceedings on 13 March 1839, and the L&SR took legal advice which recommended that the road bridge not be built, but even so the L&SR acceded to the NBC's demands and built the bridge over the railway.

During the 1860s, Northam residents campaigned for a local intermediate station, but the LSWR was not in favour because Northam would be only a short distance away from the main terminus, which would become known as Southampton Terminus. Nevertheless, a site was investigated between, what is now, Mount Pleasant level crossing and the current SWR train depot. Eventually the station was built on the south side of Northam Road bridge, not far from where the temporary terminus once stood.

The new Northam station opened on 1 December 1872. It was built by a company called Joseph Bull & Sons, which at the time had its own tramway system from its premises at Belvidere Wharf on the River Itchen to areas north of the location. As well as building Northam railway station, the company was associated with much of the early railway construction in Southampton and near-by areas.

When Northam opened, only tickets to depart could be bought at the station. Passengers travelling to Northam had to buy tickets to Southampton Terminus, with Northam acting as a ticket platform. The station never needed any goods facilities or sidings due to its close proximity to Southampton Terminus, which handled all the goods traffic in Southampton.

Northam station was situated between the northern and southern junctions leading to the line to Southampton Central. Northam only served trains to and from Southampton Terminus. The station offices on the up line to London were made out of wood and each platform could be accessed only by steps from Northam Road bridge. Northam also had an engine shed, which was 14 tracks wide but short in length, with room for only two locomotives under cover. It opened in October 1840, but closed on 1 January 1903 when Eastleigh Railway depot was opened.

With traffic booming for both Northam and Southampton Terminus in the early 1900s, the bridge crossing the line at the station was rebuilt in 1908. Only one entrance was retained, but a new footbridge connecting the platforms was provided, as well as new station buildings.

Northam station closed on 5 September 1966. By the 1960s, with most traffic now going to Southampton Central, business at Northam and Southampton Terminus was in decline. Both stations were closed prior to electrification of the main line in 1967. Northam station was demolished in 1969 and no traces remain of it. However the former up line still runs through the site of the station and is used for freight trains going to the docks. The down lines which ran through Northam are now connected to the nearby Siemens Mobility train care depot for South Western Railway.

Preceding station	Disused railways	Following station
St Denys	Southern Region of British Railways; London to Southampton	Southampton Terminus; Line and station closed

== Future station ==
A few campaigns have been launched to reopen Northam station next door to St Mary's stadium to serve nearby local residents and allow football charter trains to stop outside St Mary's stadium which is home to the local football team Southampton FC. South West Trains showed no interest in reopening either Northam or Southampton Terminus, claiming that the South West Main Line is already full with both passenger and freight trains and Northam Junction is also extremely busy.

A £10 million pound plan was put forward in 1999 to reopen Southampton Terminus and Northam Station, which was to have been controlled by Anglia Railways, their plans included building a new rail-link using the current remaining track by St. Marys Stadium and as far as the Waterfront, which is now safe guarded by Southampton City Council for future rail links. This would have allowed trains to go from Southampton Waterfront to East Anglia without the need to change at London. It was also hoped it would reduce the traffic around Southampton with a local commuter line linking the Waterfront to Romsey, Halterworth and Chandler's Ford. The plans were thwarted after South West Trains changed their 1999 time table, which resulted in two of Southampton Central's four tracks being blocked for about 20 minutes of each hour, resulting in capacity issues.

On the run up to the 2018 local election, the local Conservative Party pledged to fund a report into the feasibility of reopening the station if they win, it was hoped that reopening the link would encourage more use of public transport and reduce air pollution.
