= Thornhill, Southampton =

Suburb of Southampton, England

Coordinates: 50.91°N 1.34°W

Thornhill
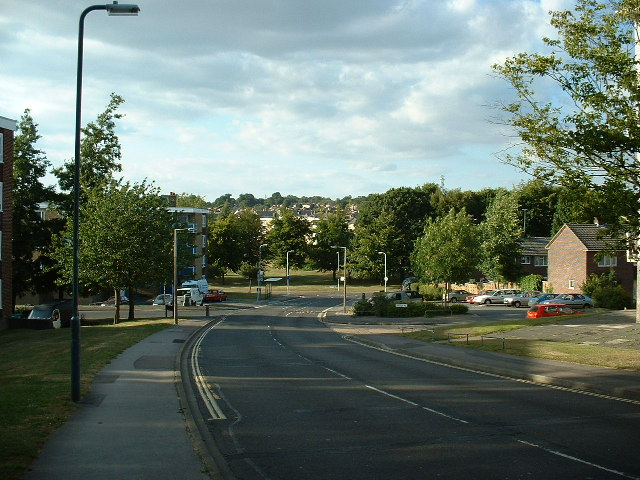
- Warburton Road, Thornhill

- Location within Southampton
- Unitary authority: Southampton
- Ceremonial county: Hampshire
- Region: South East
- Country: England
- Sovereign state: United Kingdom
- Post town: SOUTHAMPTON
- Postcode district: SO19
- Dialling code: 023
- Police: Hampshire and Isle of Wight
- Fire: Hampshire and Isle of Wight
- Ambulance: South Central
- UK Parliament: Southampton Itchen

Thornhill is a suburb of Southampton, United Kingdom, situated on the eastern border of the city and bounded by three major roads. According to the 2001 census the population was 11,460. Those under age 16 represent 23.4% of the population, 5% more than the city figure of 18.2%; those over age 65 represent 17.4% of the population, again higher than the city average of 14.5%.

== History ==
In 1954 the boundaries of Southampton were extended to include Millbrook, Redbridge, Harefield and part of Thornhill. Thornhill was a small estate of private homes, which was massively expanded in the 1960s by the building of council properties. A large proportion of the occupiers of the original houses are retired accounting for the previously mentioned higher than normal numbers. After the introduction of The right to buy scheme in the late 1980s, a considerable number of the council properties were purchased from Southampton City Council. Owner-occupiers represent 43.9% of properties according to the 2001 census compared to 47.5% local council tenure. The remainder are made up of Housing Association and privately rented homes. The main road through the estate is Hinkler Road, which was named in honour of its most famous resident, Bert Hinkler who flew solo from England to Australia in 1928, there is also a pub named after him, The Hinkler, on Hinkler Road.

Recognised as an area of social deprivation, Thornhill was one of 39 areas around the country chosen in 1999 for the New Deal for Communities. This was controlled by a board of 12 local residents and 8 representatives of relevant agencies (police, primary health care, city council, chamber of commerce etc.) and was known as Thornhill Plus You. Almost £50 Million was available to invest in the area over a 10-year period which commenced in 2000. This was spent on a large number of diverse projects.

As part of the redevelopment of Thornhill, during the morning of Tuesday 29 June 2010, a turf-cutting ceremony signalled the start of construction at Eastpoint Centre in Burgoyne Road, Thornhill. The centre, now the Highpoint Centre, provides a hub for business and community alike. It boasts the latest conference facilities across a three-storey 3,770 sq m development. There is also training space, a social club and a cafe.

A succession strategy for the end of the 10-year programme was put in place resulting in the formation of Plus You Limited. The purpose of this was to ensure continued regeneration and benefit for the community of Thornhill.

== Culture and community ==
Youth schemes such as the Thornhill Festival, which allowed musicians from the area to showcase their talents, Impact youth group and two active youth clubs were all lost soon after the end of the New Deal for Communities era, leaving a lack of activities for the higher than average number of young people in the area.

A shared Community Allotment on Hinkler Road, opposite the Hinkler Pub, is maintained by community members.

== Landmarks ==
=== Antelope Park ===
Antelope Park was a run-down office block and Jewson's regional headquarters. It has been redeveloped into a £25m retail and entertainment complex, with Jewsons being relocated to a new building at the rear of the site.

=== Prospect Place ===
On 22 February 2010, The Hinkler Parade Regeneration Scheme took a step forward with the approval of £15 million project which would see the demolition of seventeen shops – many of which were boarded up – twenty-two flats, and a five-storey block of sixteen flats in Marston Road, and their replacement with 106 new homes – which are a mix of rent, part buy-part rent and full ownership, 5 new shops and a community center. The property developers granted by Southampton City Council were Barratt Homes and First Wessex.

On 22 March 2010, a ceremony took place at 12:30pm which marked the beginning of the Hinkler Parade Regeneration Project. Hinkler Parade was also renamed to Prospect Place.

=== Highpoint Centre ===
Plus you Limited, the legacy of Thornhill's New Deal for Community funding, own and run the Highpoint conference and business centre, continuing to generate income for the community of Thornhill.

== Education ==
There are three schools on the Estate: Hightown Primary School, Kane's Hill Primary School and Thornhill Primary School.

There is also a special needs primary school called Springwell School designated for pupils with minor learning difficulties including speech and language disorders, autism and challenging behaviour, which opened its doors to students in September 2007, though was not officially opened until March 2008.

== Transport ==
Thornhill is currently served by multiple bus services, all operated by Bluestar. The primary routes serving the area are the 18 and 19, the former of which operates between here and Millbrook via Bitterne, and the latter of which operates between here and Lordshill via Woolston. Both routes operate via Southampton Central station and Shirley. The 19 was previously operated by CityRed as the 3, but was taken over by Bluestar following the decision by FirstGroup to withdraw all Southampton based bus services by 19 February 2023.

== Religious groups and sites ==
There are three churches. One is Thornhill Baptist in Thornhill Park Road. Another is the Circle Community, formerly known as Thornhill Vineyard, who meet twice a month in Kanes Hill School. They left the Vineyard movement in 2024 because of the Vineyard's more conservative stance on LGBT, which they disagreed with. Finally there is St. Christopher's Parish Church on Hinkler Road. The Parish Church is close to the main shopping area (which includes the all usual social amenities) and is located in the centre of the estate.

== Public spaces ==
=== Hinkler Green ===
The redevelopment of Hinkler Green added space for casual sports to the public park, with a football pitch, a running track, a basketball court, a MUGA, skateboard ramps and outdoor gym equipment. Hinkler Green also offers a children's play area, a peaceful garden, mature trees, and space for picnics, and wild plants.

=== Dumbleton Copse and Netley Common ===
Dumbleton Copse and Netley Common are ideal spaces for a quiet local walk. Although sandwiched between Thornhill and the A27, there is a feeling of being in the countryside. At the right time of year Aberdeen Angus Cows can be seen on the common as part of its management.

=== Thornhill Park ===
Between Thornhill Park Road and Byron Road, Thornhill park is host to a multitude of mature trees and wildlife, as well as a children's play area.

=== Antelope Park ===
As well as shopping, takeaway food, and a coffee shop, Antelope Park hosts a gym and a trampoline centre.
