= Bitterne Park School =

Secondary school in Southampton, UK

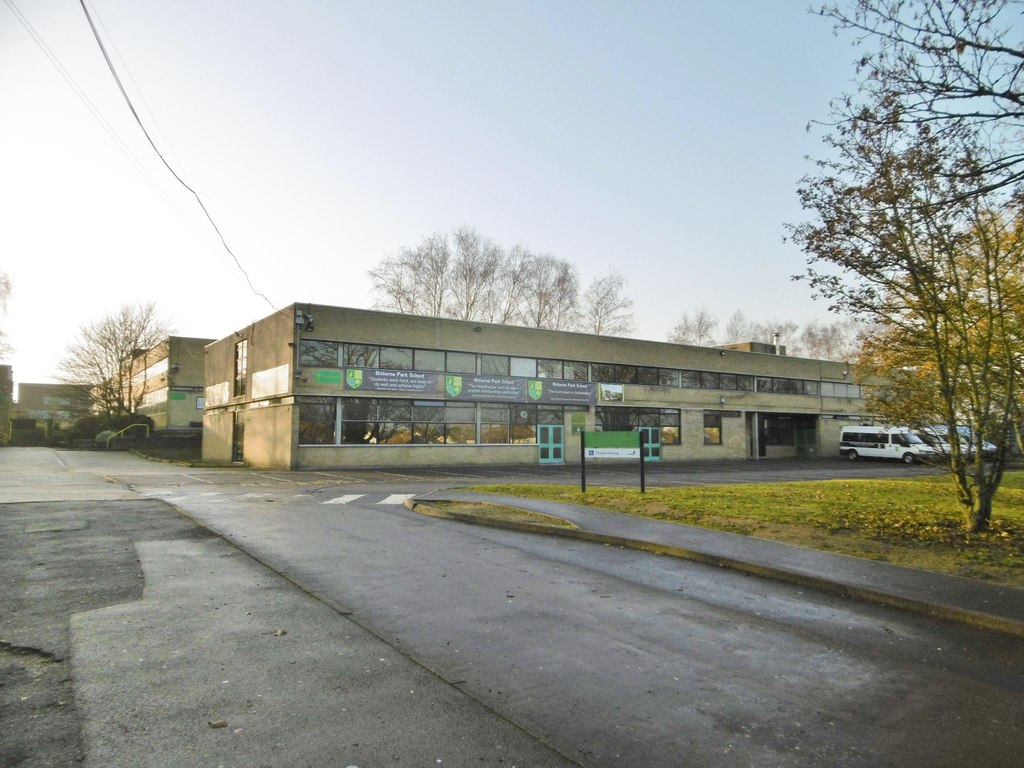
- The school buildings in 2016, prior to redevelopment

Location
- Copsewood Road; Southampton, Hampshire; England; 50.93°N 1.37°W

Information
- Type: Foundation school
- Motto: RACER (Respect, Achievement, Community, Enjoyment, Relationships)
- Established: 1 September 1995
- Local authority: Southampton
- Trust: Reach Cooperative Trust
- Department for Education URN: 116458 Tables
- Ofsted: Reports
- Head teacher: Stewart Roderick
- Gender: Mixed
- Age: 11 to 19
- Website: bitterneparkschool.org.uk

Bitterne Park School is a large mixed secondary comprehensive school in the Bitterne Park suburb of Southampton, Hampshire, in the south of England.

The school last received an Ofsted inspection on 29 and 30 November 2017, in which it was rated 'Good'.

== History ==
=== Rebuilding ===
With school buildings dating from 1965, Bitterne Park School was included in a bid for the government's Building Schools for the Future programme. The school's management had been working with architects and the city council in plans for the new building, but the entire programme was scrapped by the 2010 coalition government under their austerity regime. The plans would have included a new theatre.

The school was subsequently named as one of the most dilapidated schools in England and prioritised for new building funds under a private finance initiative arrangement, but this programme was also cancelled by the government in 2013. Meanwhile the school continued to be beset by problems relating to the aging buildings including crumbling concrete from the buildings falling and narrowly missing pupils, the gymnasium roof leaking and causing extensive damage including large holes in the ceiling and staff having to mop up the water before PE lessons, rotting panels and tiles falling in the showers, and various temporary arrangements due to lack of space.

On 15 September 2015, a new set of plans for a new school building were approved by the city council and on 3 March 2016 a ground-breaking ceremony was held at the school to mark the commencement of the construction of the new building, funded by a £30 million investment from the national Priority School Building Programme. The new building would enable the school to expand to accommodate 1800 pupils in secondary education, in addition to 180 sixth form students. The project was due for completion in October 2017 with the demolition of the previous buildings to be completed by April 2018, along with landscaping of the site.

The new building was fully open from 13 September 2017 and includes a theatre, assembly hall and drama studios.

== Notable former pupils ==
- Darren Anderton, footballer
- Caragh McMurtry, rower
- Chris Packham, naturalist and television presenter
- Royston Smith
- Ali Sparkes, novelist
