= Bitterne =

Suburb of Southampton, England

Coordinates: 50°54′48″N 1°21′42″W

- Suburb
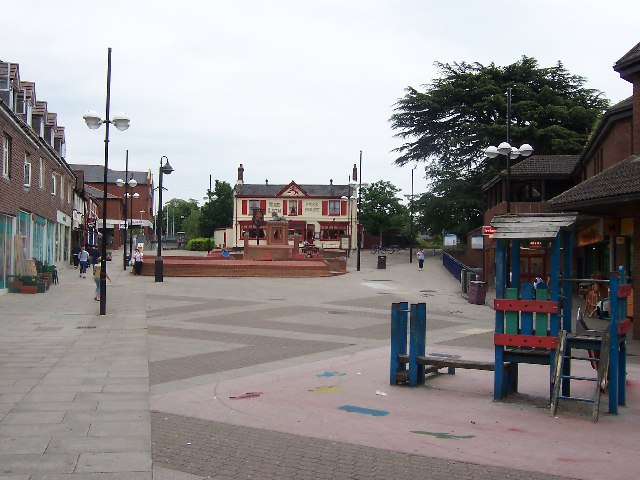
- The pedestrianised area of Bitterne Road is a popular shopping precinct. This is the old junction of Bitterne Road and Portsmouth Roads looking east.

- Location within Southampton
- Area: 2.47 km^{2} (0.95 sq mi)
- Population: 13,800 (2011 Census. Ward)
  - Density: 5,587/km^{2} (14,470/sq mi)
- OS grid reference: SU451129
- Unitary authority: Southampton
- Ceremonial county: Hampshire
- Region: South East
- Country: England
- Sovereign state: United Kingdom
- Post town: SOUTHAMPTON
- Postcode district: SO18
- Dialling code: 023
- Police: Hampshire and Isle of Wight
- Fire: Hampshire and Isle of Wight
- Ambulance: South Central
- UK Parliament: Southampton Itchen

Bitterne is an eastern suburb and ward of Southampton, in the ceremonial county of Hampshire, England.

Bitterne derives its name not from the similarly named bird, the bittern, but probably from the bend in the River Itchen; the Old English words byht and ærn together mean "house near a bend" or possibly bita ærn; "house of horse bits", either most likely a reference to Bitterne Manor House. A reference from the late 11th century spells the name Byterne.

Bitterne Ward comprises the suburbs of Bitterne and Thornhill, and had a population of 13,800 at the 2011 census. The ward borders Sholing Ward and Harefield Ward to the west and north.

== History ==
The focal point of Bitterne today is the former location of Bitterne Village (and is still occasionally referred to by that name), but the village is predated by the settlement at Bitterne Manor, the site of the original Roman settlement of Clausentum, the forerunner of today's City of Southampton.

Bitterne is not mentioned in the Domesday Book but first appears in a late 11th century entry in the Bishop of Winchester's register as Byterne. This is, however, a reference to Bitterne Manor, not to the settlement known as Bitterne today.

In 1665, the population of Bitterne was estimated to be 75 inhabitants, across 15 houses, which included Bitterne Manor House and Peartree House.

A new estate was built in 1760, known then as Bitterne Grove and today housing St Mary's Independent School. A number of workers' cottages were erected to support the estate and the farming activities at Bitterne Manor and Townhill Park; the cottages were in the Mousehole area of Bitterne. In the 1790s, frequent royal visits to Southampton encouraged a spate of land-buying in the area, and further estates were added to the Bitterne area, including Ridgeway, Sydney Farm and Midanbury Lodge. Townhill Park House was also built around this time, and Chessel House was built in 1796 by David Lance. Aware that access to his land was poor, Lance encouraged the building of a bridge over the River Itchen linking Bitterne Manor to Northam, and another bridge over the River Hamble at Bursledon, with a road linking the bridges meeting another new road, to Botley, at the location known as the centre of today's Bitterne. Construction of this new road and the bridges was completed in 1801. Although this new junction on an important communications route would eventually stimulate the growth of Bitterne Village, an account of 1826 mentions only the estate houses and not any hamlet or collection of cottages.

By the 20th Century, Bitterne Village was swallowed up by fast expanding Southampton. During the 1950s, Bitterne underwent extensive renovation, with the destruction of Victorian cottage housing areas to be replaced with flats and estates on the old farm land. The Angel pub went to be replaced by Sainsbury's, the Methodist church by Lloyds Bank (with the Methodists joining with the Anglican church).

During the 1980s, work was carried out to bypass the bottleneck of the main high street by looping the A3024 from the top of Lances Hill eastwards through some of the poorer housing to a new junction with the Hedge End road and demolishing the old post office and United Reformed Church. This enabled the pedestrianisation of the old high street.

== Government ==
Bitterne is a ward within the unitary authority of Southampton, returning three councillors to the city council. As well as Bitterne itself, the Bitterne ward represents the neighbouring suburb of Thornhill and had a combined population of 13,800 at the 2011 census. As of May 2021, the three councillors representing the ward are Terry Streets, Elliot Prior and Matthew Magee (Conservatives).

Bitterne was formerly a tything and chapelry in the parish of South Stoneham, on 31 December 1894 Bitterne became a separate civil parish, on 1 April 1925 the parish was abolished and merged with Southampton. In 1921 the parish had a population of 3882. It is now in the unparished area of Southampton.

== Geography ==
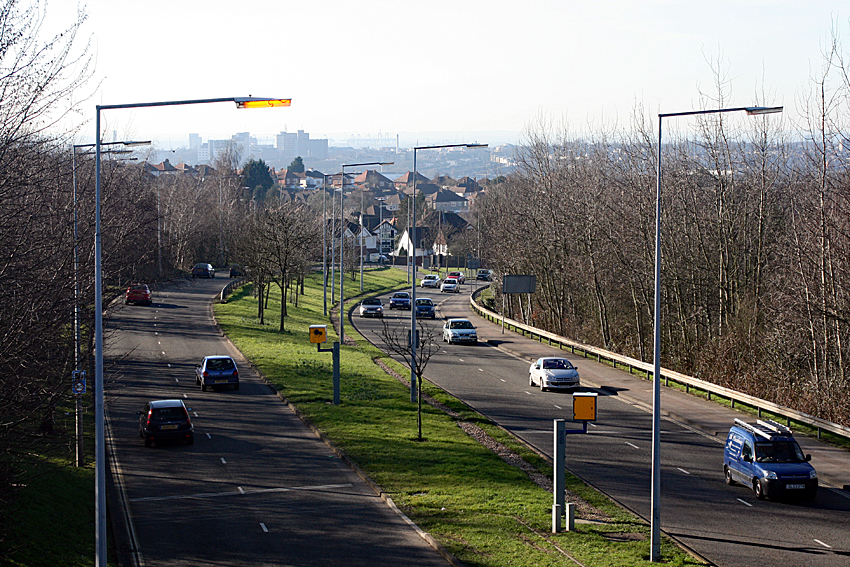
View over Southampton from Bitterne

As with many city suburbs the boundaries of Bitterne itself are not well defined; however the ward (which includes neighbouring Thornhill) comprises an area of 2.47 square kilometres (0.95 sq mi). The area is entirely suburban in nature, and located 3.5 kilometres (2.2 mi) northeast of the Bargate in Southampton City Centre. It is atop a raised part eastern shoulder of the lower Itchen valley, with views over much of the city visible from parts of the suburb. The road up the valley shoulder from the floodplain was named Lance's Hill after David Lance, who owned Chessel House and encouraged the construction of the Northam Bridge linking Bitterne to central Southampton. The road now bypasses the central shopping area and is a dual carriageway, carrying the A3024 road. Because the Northam Bridge is the southernmost toll-free bridge into Southampton from the east, traffic on this route can be heavy: in 2014 the annual average daily flow was 25,936 motor vehicles (not including motorcycles), 474 motorcycles and 110 pedal cycles. The bypassed section of the road is pedestrianised, forming a popular shopping precinct.

== Demography ==
Bitterne Ward had a population of 13,800 in the 2011 census, of which 3,079 (22.3%) were under 15, 8,429 (61.1%) of working age and 2,292 (16.6%) aged 65 or over. Proportionately Bitterne has fewer people of working age than Southampton as a whole (69.6%), and more people in both the younger and older age groups. However the population of all three age groups in Bitterne had increased since the 2001 census.

The area is predominantly indigenous, with white British comprising 91.1% of the population. No other ethnic group accounts for more than 2.6% of the population. The only ward in Southampton with a higher indigenous proportion in the 2011 census was neighbouring Sholing, with 92.4% being white British. This is against an average for the city of 77.7%.

54.5% of Bitterne's population identified as having a Christian belief in the 2011 census, with 35.9% identifying as having no religion. The next largest religious group in the ward are the Muslims, who accounted for 1.3% of the population.

In the 2011 census, 7% of Bitterne Ward's population assessed themselves as being in bad or very bad health; the highest proportion of any ward in Southampton identifying as such. Bitterne also had the highest proportion of the population affected by a long-term health problem or disability that limits day-to-day activities.

An article in The Guardian in 2014 identified Bitterne as a working-class community.

== Economy ==
There are no significant industrial estates or manufacturing facilities in Bitterne so employment in the area tends to be oriented around the service industry, and retail in particular. In addition to the permanent stores in the shopping precinct, Bitterne hosts a weekly street market, which was approved by the city council in 2009 following a successful pilot which began in October 2008.

== Community facilities ==
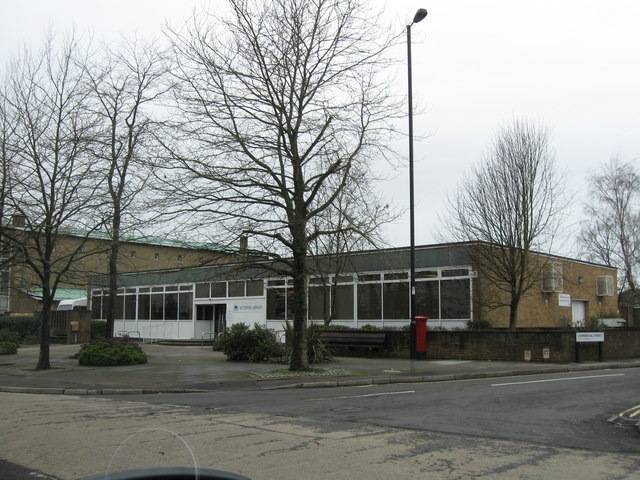
Bitterne Library

Bitterne Library is one of the largest libraries in Southampton and a number of regular activities take place there, including various reading groups, an IT club, job club, and family history group. There is an active local history society which has published a number of books and runs a charity shop and museum on Peartree Avenue.

Bitterne Leisure Centre is managed by Active Nation, a national sport and exercise charity, and offers a wide range of activities, including swimming, exercise classes, table tennis, a gymnasium, badminton, martial arts and children's activities, including birthday parties. There is a commercial gymnasium above Sainsbury's supermarket on the precinct, a location which formerly housed a ten-pin bowling centre. This was opened in 1965 as the Excel Bowl before being taken over by AMF Bowling and renamed "Bitterne Bowl". The centre moved to the Swan Centre in Eastleigh as part of a redevelopment project there in November/December 2008.

Between the library and leisure centre is Bitterne Health Centre, which houses a GP surgery and emergency dental service, as well as an NHS walk-in centre; however the latter is currently earmarked for closure. There are also a number of other GP surgeries in the area.

== Transport ==
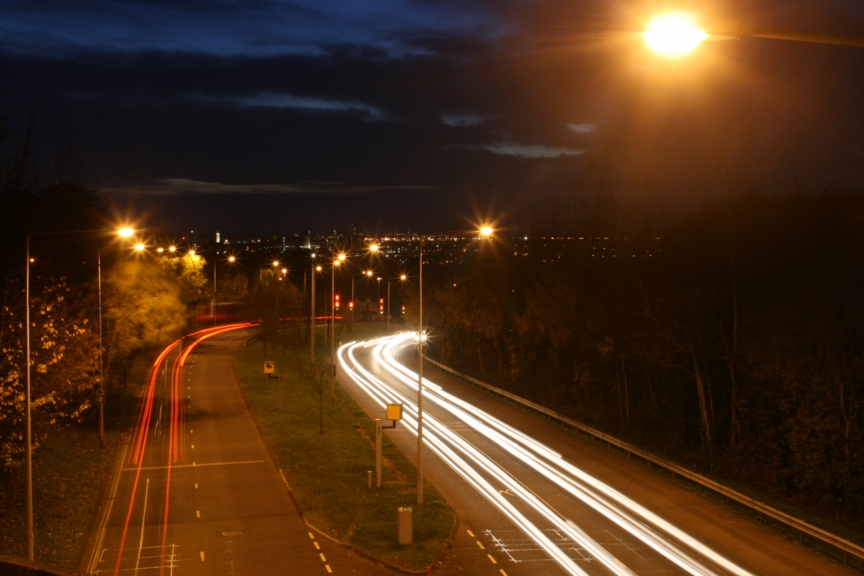
Traffic on the A3024 Bitterne by-pass

Bitterne is at the junction of the A334 and A3024 roads, providing easy access by road to the M27 motorway to the east and Southampton City Centre to the southwest. As a result, Bitterne is well served by a number of bus routes with operators including Bluestar and Xelabus.

Bitterne railway station is located roughly 1.2 kilometres (0.75 mi) west of the shopping precinct and is on the West Coastway Line.

Bus Routes: 3,13,14,16,18 ( Bluestar )

== Education ==
Primary schools in the area include the Bitterne's Church of England Primary school, Glenfield Infant School and Beechwood Junior School.

There are no public sector secondary schools in Bitterne itself but it is well served by the surrounding areas, with Bitterne Park School, Woodlands Community College and Oasis Academy Sholing all within walking distance. As well as the sixth form at Bitterne Park School, the nearby Itchen College offers a range of further education courses.

Primary School

- Beechwood Junior School
- Bitterne C&E Primary School
- Glenfield Infant School
- Bitterne Park Primary School

Secondary School/Sixth Form College

- Bitterne Park School

== Religious sites ==
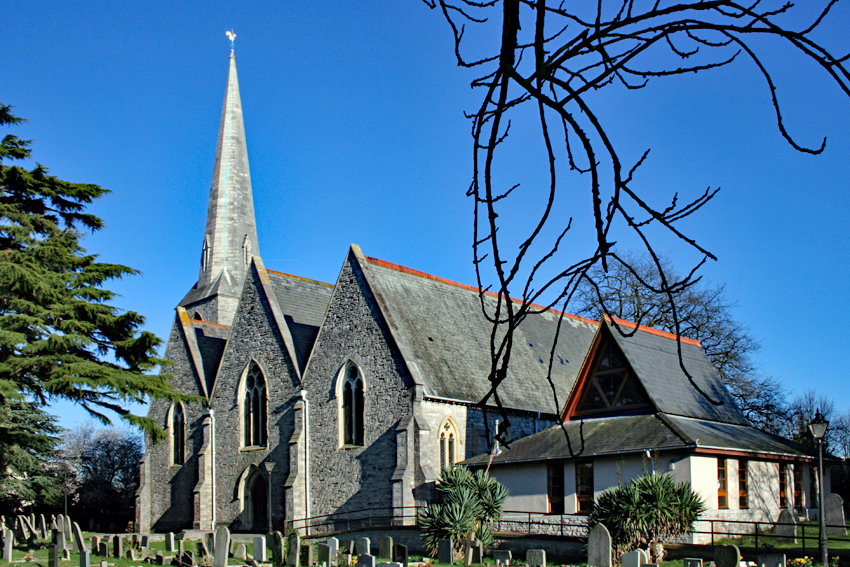
Church of the Holy Saviour, Bitterne

Bitterne's parish church is dedicated to the Holy Saviour and its spire is a local landmark. The church is an Anglican and Methodist partnership following the merger of the two congregations and the sale of the Methodist church building in the late 20th century. It is a Grade II listed building.

Bitterne United Reformed Church is located at the top of the pedestrian precinct, next to the parish church, and occupies the first floor of its building with retail outlets underneath.

The Christ the King Roman Catholic Church is another local landmark on the main A3024 road, located between the health centre and library. Bitterne Spiritualist Church was established in 1947 and is located at the top of Lances Hill.

Between 1904 and 2024 Bitterne was home to the Redcote Convent. The Convent belonged to the order of Our Lady of Charity and its initial nuns had relocated from France.
