= Portswood =

Coordinates: 50.9261°N 1.3931°W

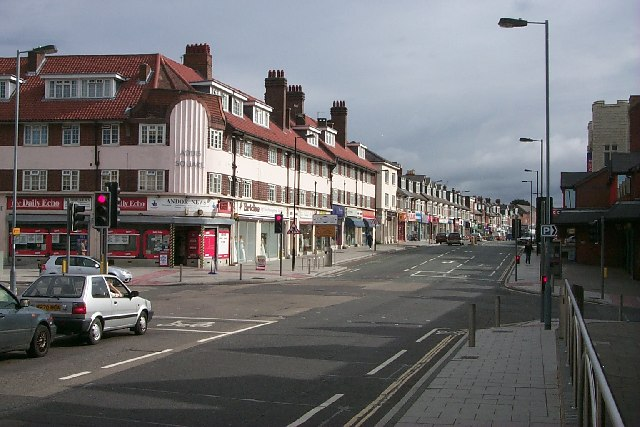
- Portswood's shopping area (Portswood Road)

- Location within Southampton
- Area: 2.79 km^{2} (1.08 sq mi)
- Population: 14,831
  - Density: 5,316/km^{2} (13,770/sq mi)
- OS grid reference: SU434150
- Unitary authority: Southampton
- Ceremonial county: Hampshire
- Region: South East
- Country: England
- Sovereign state: United Kingdom
- Post town: SOUTHAMPTON
- Postcode district: SO17
- Dialling code: 023
- Police: Hampshire and Isle of Wight
- Fire: Hampshire and Isle of Wight
- Ambulance: South Central
- UK Parliament: Southampton Test

Portswood is a suburb and electoral ward of Southampton, England. The suburb lies to the north-north-east of the city centre and is bounded by (clockwise from west) Freemantle, Highfield, Swaythling, St. Denys and Bevois Valley.

Portswood Ward comprises Portswood, Highfield and St. Denys, and had a population of 14,831 at the 2011 Census. It is a largely residential area adjacent to the main campus of the University of Southampton, and as such more than a quarter of residents are students.

== History ==
The Manor of Portswood, which originally included the modern-day Bevois Town, Swaythling, St Denys and Highfield, was first named in a charter dating from 1045. The name Portswood comes from the Old English Porteswuda, meaning "wood of the town".

The manor was granted to St. Denys Priory by Richard I in 1189, and it remained under their ownership until the Dissolution of the Monasteries by Henry VIII in 1536. The land, and the title Lord of the manor, were purchased by Francis Dawtrey in 1538, and passed through several hands before being bought by Giles Stibbert in 1771. Stibbert, Lieutenant-General with the East India Company and later Commander-in-Chief of India, built the first Portswood House on the estate to the design of a Mr. Crunden.

The house, which stood in the area now bounded by Spring Crescent and Lawn Road, was demolished in 1852 to make way for more housing, and the name Portswood House transferred to the nearby Portswood Lodge. The estate was gradually sold for development, and the second Portswood House was demolished in 1923, allowing the whole estate to be sold by 1928.

In 1871 an attempt by the Southampton board of health to improve the local sewage system was opposed over concerns about higher taxes. Improvements were eventually begun in 1875.

== Governance ==
Prior to 1894, Portswood was a tithing in the parish of South Stoneham, a parish more than ten times the size of Portswood Ward today, stretching as far as Eastleigh to the north. A parliamentary paper from 1837 indicates that the Village of Portswood consisted of about thirty houses at this time, and in the 1861 Census, the population of the entire tithing was placed at 3,546.

The Local Government Act 1894 divided South Stoneham into multiple parts, and Portswood became a civil parish in its own right. The population of Portswood civil parish was 10,038 in 1891, grew to 17,958 in 1901, and had reached 22,501 by 1911. Portswood parish at that time included parts of Bitterne and was approximately 1,037 acres (1.62 square miles) by comparison with today's 690 acres (1.08 square miles).

Today, Portswood is an electoral ward of the City of Southampton, and falls within the Southampton Test constituency of the UK Parliament. The ward elects three councillors to Southampton City Council, currently one from Labour and two from the Green party.

== Education ==
Portswood Ward includes the main Highfield Campus of the University of Southampton. The University's first presence in Highfield was in 1914, although the outbreak of the First World War meant the site became a military hospital and was not used for lectures until 1920.

The ward has three state-run primary schools; Portswood Primary School on Somerset Road, Highfield School on Hawthorn Road, and St Denys School on Dundee Road. There is also a small independent primary school, St Winifred's School, on Winn Road.

The nearest secondary schools are Cantell School in Bassett Green, and Bitterne Park School.

== Public services ==
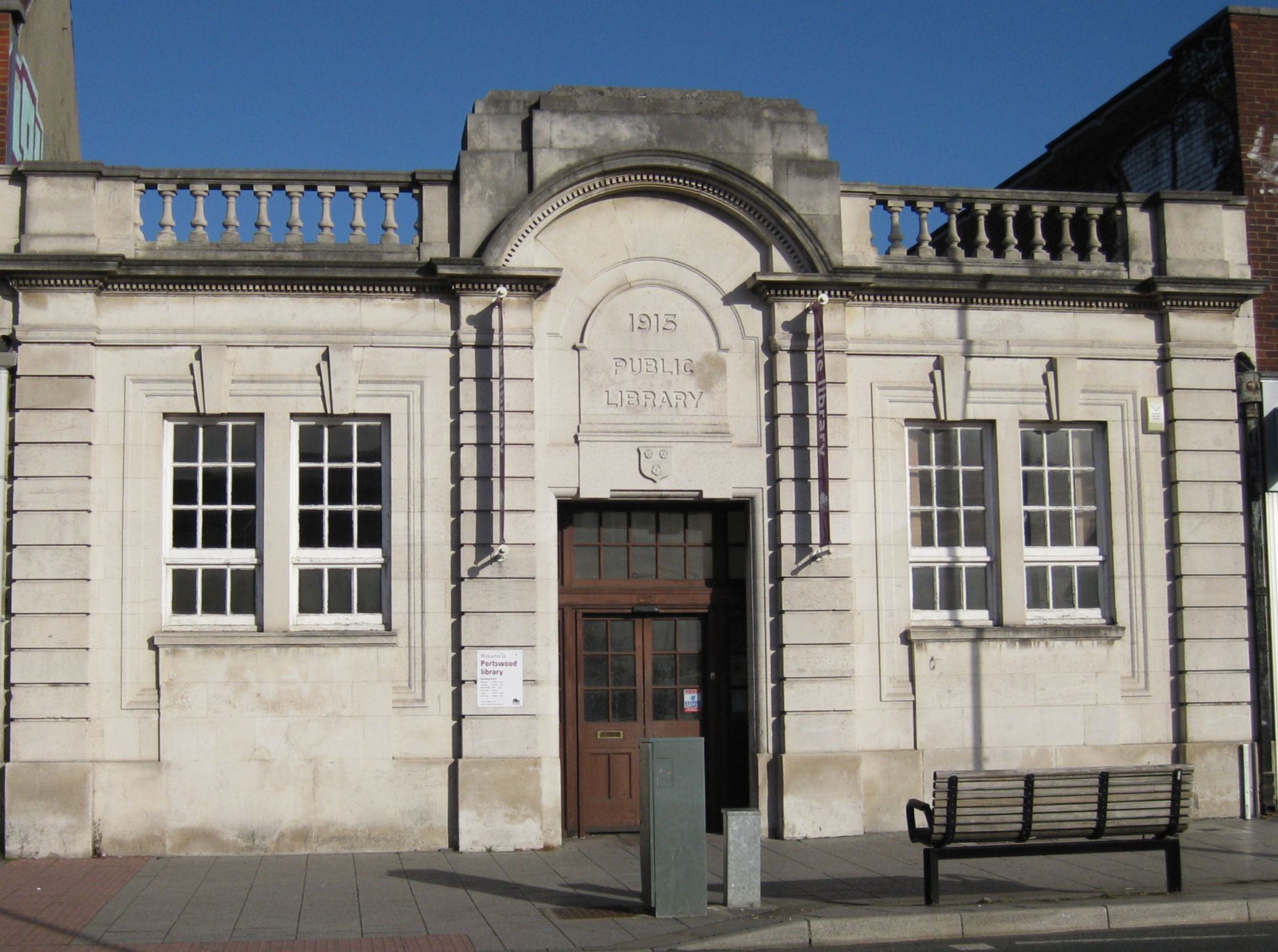
Portswood library

Portswood Library opened on 25 October 1915 despite a failed application for Carnegie funding in 1914 and the subsequent outbreak of the First World War. Built immediately to the north of the old Palladium Cinema on Portswood Road, the building was designed by J A Crowther, the Borough Surveyor, on land acquired by Portswood councillor Sidney Kimber following the break-up of the Portswood House estate.

Portswood Police Station on St Denys Road, run by the Hampshire Constabulary, serves the local policing areas Banister Park & Bevois, Bassett, Highfield, St. Denys and Swaythling.

Portswood is served by the Hampshire and Isle of Wight Fire and Rescue Service and by the fire station in St Mary's.

== Landmarks ==
The lodge to the original Portswood House was preserved after the demolition of the house itself in 1852, and is now a Grade II listed building, standing at 324 Portswood Road.

Portswood once had two cinemas, both of which have since closed. While the Palladium Cinema (1913–1958) was converted into a supermarket and lost its distinctive facade, the old Broadway Cinema remains a prominent landmark. The cinema opened on 6 June 1930 with a showing of the film Rookery Nook and remained open for 33 years until 26 October 1963. After a period of time as a Mecca Bingo Hall, it is now a church.

== Culture ==
Portswood has a dedicated live music venue—The Brook, on Portswood Road. The Brook is a 600-capacity venue which has seen performances from Steve Harley and Cockney Rebel (in 2004, 2006, 2008 and 2010), as well as Steve Harley's 2-man (1998, 1999 and 2002), 3-man (2011) and 4-man (2003 and 2004) acoustic sets. More contemporary outfits such as The Hoosiers and Mr. Scruff have also played the venue. The venue went into liquidation in May 2007, but it was put on the market for £900,000, and was saved in August that year.

There are a number of pubs in the area covering different tastes from sports bars, to student-friendly pubs and real ale pubs.

Another hub of note is October Books, a bookseller run by a not-for-profit co-operative and based in Portswood's main high street. As well as mainstream publications, it also sells a range of Fairtrade and organic products, in addition to magazines and books focusing on environmental, political, social and vegan/vegetarian subjects. For these reasons, it is also a community focus for Southampton's left wing and alternative scenes and has regular seed swaps. Founded in 1977 on Onslow Road, it moved to Portswood in 2003 (raising £6,000 to cover the cost of its lease), before raising £500,000 from local and commercial sources to purchase a permanent home in the building of an old bank in 2018. For this latest move, 150 metres down Portswood High Street, October Books asked the local community to help it move the books to the new shop – the resulting human chain received national and international press coverage.

== Transport ==
The railway station is St Denys which is on the London Waterloo to Weymouth mainline and the West Coastway Line. There are also regular bus services to the city centre and other parts of Southampton from Bluestar, UniLink and Xelabus.

From 1879 to 1949, Portswood was home to one of the two Southampton Corporation Tramways depots, and a tram service ran from the site on Portswood Road to Stag Gates, at the junction of the Avenue and Lodge Road. Many of the corporation's trams were built in the depot during this time. It was converted to a bus depot in 1949, and was the head office of First Hampshire & Dorset. The site now belongs to Sainsbury’s Superstore, which opened in February 2012.

== Notable residents ==
R. J. Mitchell, chief designer of the Supermarine Spitfire, lived at 2 Russell Place in Portswood during its development, and until his death in 1937. In 2005, English Heritage commemorated Mitchell with a Blue Plaque at his former home.

According to a report in the Daily Echo, Coldplay drummer Will Champion used to live in Portswood, and used to attend a youth activities group at Highfield Church.

Captain Edward J. Smith, an English naval officer and ship's captain who commanded the RMS Titanic during her maiden voyage, lived in an imposing red brick, twin-gabled house known as "Woodhead" on Winn Road. The house no longer stands today and has been replaced with an apartment complex.

Broadcaster and naturalist, Chris Packham, lived in Portswood as a child, according to his memoir, Fingers in the Sparkle Jar.
