= Abbotts Barton =

Suburb of Winchester, Hampshire, England

Coordinates: 51.073549°N 1.310711°W

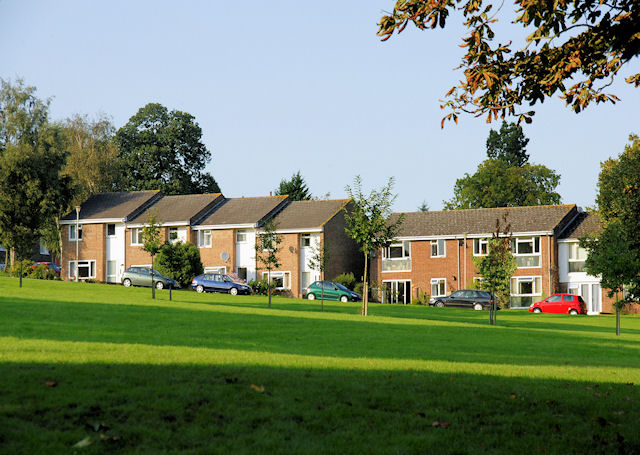
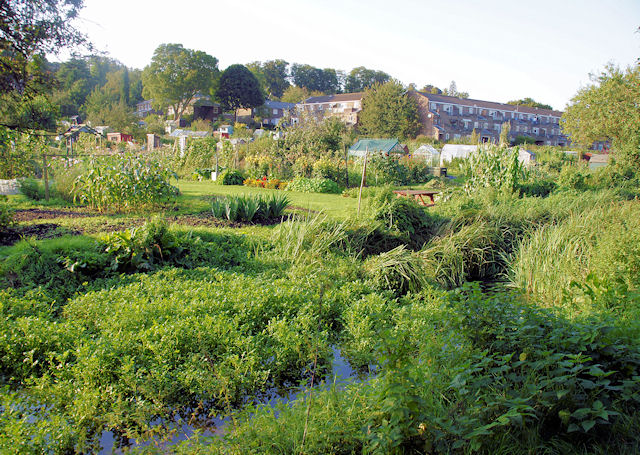
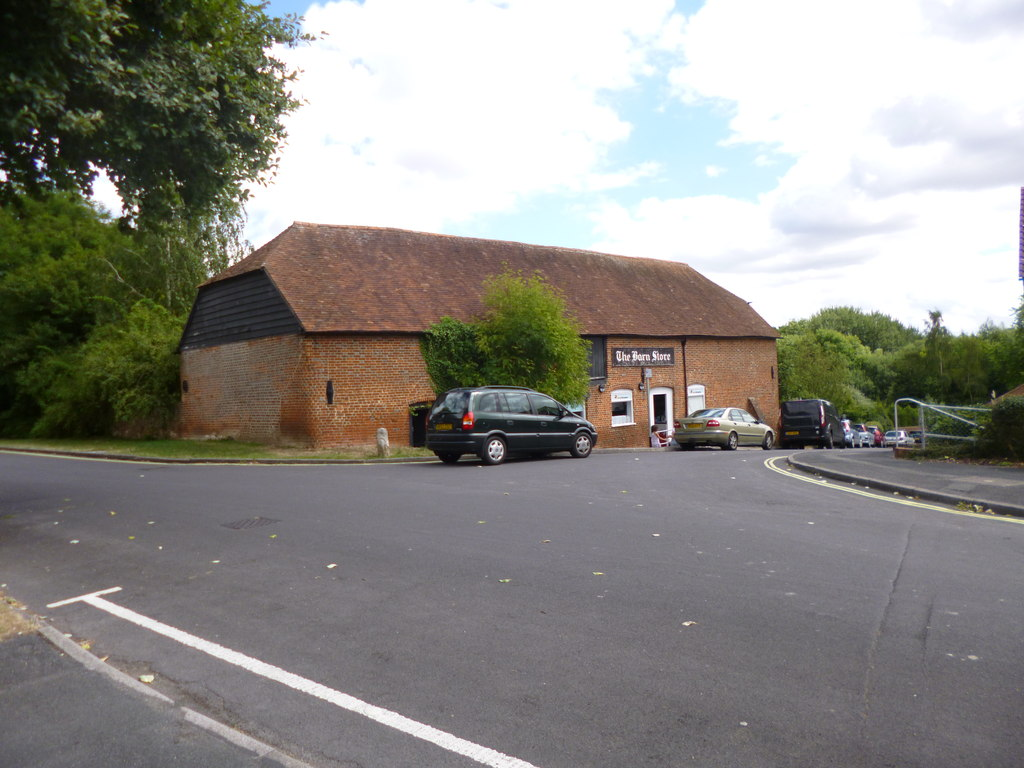
- (Clockwise from top) Charles Close, Abbotts Barton Barn Store, Allottments

- Location within Hampshire
- OS grid reference: SU484308
- District: City of Winchester
- Shire county: Hampshire
- Region: South East
- Country: England
- Sovereign state: United Kingdom
- Post town: WINCHESTER
- Postcode district: SO23
- Dialling code: 01962
- Police: Hampshire and Isle of Wight
- Fire: Hampshire and Isle of Wight
- Ambulance: South Central
- UK Parliament: Winchester

Abbotts Barton is a suburb of Winchester in Hampshire, England. The settlement is located approximately 0.8 miles (1.3 km) north-east of the city centre.

In 1887, John Bartholomew's Gazetteer of the British Isles described Abbots Barton as:

Abbots Barton, seat, near Winchester, Hants.

It is now in the unparished area of Winchester, in the Winchester district. It is represented on Winchester City Council as part of St Bartholomew Ward, and on Hampshire County Council as part of Winchester Eastgate Division.
