= Harefield, Southampton =

Suburb of Southampton, England

Coordinates: 50.9188°N 1.3427°W

Harefield
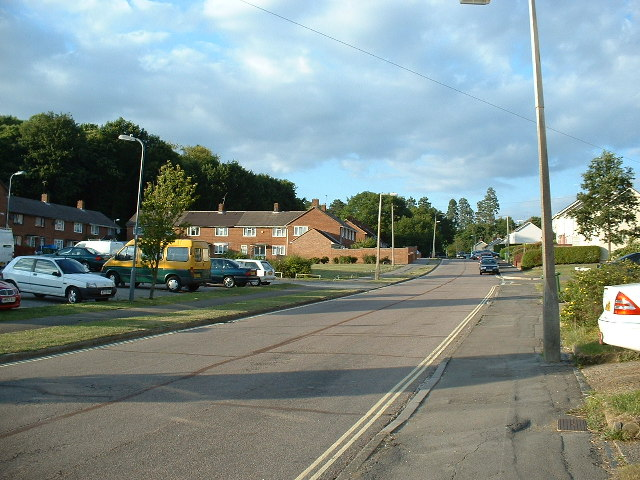
- Cheriton Avenue, Harefield

- Location within Southampton
- Area: 2.62 km^{2} (1.01 sq mi)
- Population: 14,488
  - Density: 5,530/km^{2} (14,300/sq mi)
- Unitary authority: Southampton
- Ceremonial county: Hampshire
- Region: South East
- Country: England
- Sovereign state: United Kingdom
- Post town: SOUTHAMPTON
- Postcode district: SO18
- Dialling code: 023
- Police: Hampshire and Isle of Wight
- Fire: Hampshire and Isle of Wight
- Ambulance: South Central
- UK Parliament: Southampton Itchen

Harefield is a suburb and Electoral Ward near Bitterne in Southampton, England. Harefield Ward consists of a small council housing estate built around 1952/3 on the 238-acre (0.96 km^{2}) estate of Harefield House and additional private housing.

Harefield Ward had a population of 14,448 at the 2021 Census, and is adjacent to Bitterne Park, Peartree, Sholing and Bitterne wards.

== History ==
Harefield House was a country house of Elizabethan style built in 1834 for Sir Edward Butler, chairman of the Southampton and Salisbury Railway Company. The location is now the grounds of Harefield Infant and Junior Schools on Yeovil Chase. Edwin Jones, the Southampton draper whose store ultimately became part of Debenhams bought the house in 1887. Harefield House is often mistakenly reported as burning down in 1915, this misconception is printed in the book Memories of Bitterne by Irene Pilson and seems to have stuck. The house actually burnt down on May 6, 1917, as reported in the Southern Daily Echo at the time.

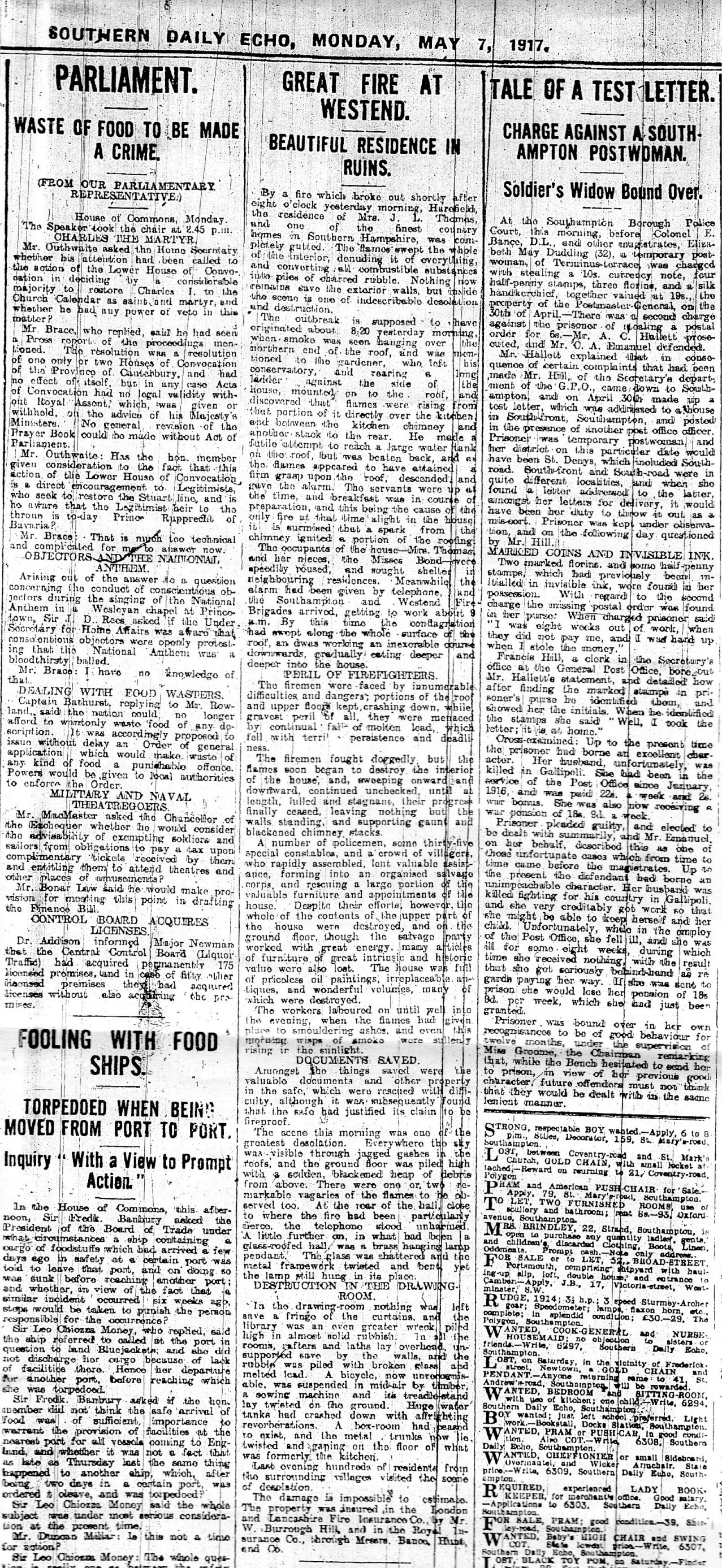

The Jones family sold the estate in 1917 and there was some building in the 1920s but it was not developed in earnest until after the Second World War.

The area was part of the civil parish of West End when it was established in 1894, but was transferred into Southampton in 1954.

The street names on the western edge of the estate are all named after Somerset place names by the private housing developers active in the late 1940s and early 1950s. The later council housing extended these streets and added more to the west that are named after Hampshire villages.

The development of the housing estate included two public houses (the Exford Arms and the Hare and Hounds), two shopping parades, two primary schools (Harefield and Moorhill, each consisting of infant and junior schools), and Moorhill Secondary School (named after Moorhill House, which stood just outside the estate in West End). The Moorhill schools and the Exford Avenue shopping parade were constructed in 1964–65. Until then there was a Post Office in a Nissen hut opposite the Exford Arms. The Hare and Hounds was open between 1963 and 2016 before being demolished in early 2018.

Moorhill Secondary School was renamed as Woodlands Community School in 1984 and subsequently demolished and rebuilt in 2003. It is now known as Woodlands Community College.

== Election results ==
Southampton City Council Elections - Thursday, 5th May, 2022
| Election Candidate | Party | Votes | % | Outcome |
|---|---|---|---|---|
| Val Laurent | Conservative | 1645 | 50% | Elected |
| Paul Robert Kenny | Labour | 1201 | 37% | Not Elected |
| Chris Bluemel | Green Party | 208 | 6% | Not Elected |
| Ben Curd | Liberal Democrats | 161 | 5% | Not Elected |
| Levi Joshua Wellman | Trade Unionists and Socialist Coalition | 50 | 2% | Not Elected |

Southampton City Council - Thursday, 2nd May, 2019
| Election Candidate | Party | Votes | % | Outcome |
|---|---|---|---|---|
| Daniel Raymond Fitzhenry | Conservative | 1646 | 47% | Elected |
| Alan Lloyd | Labour | 1088 | 315 | Not Elected |
| Christopher Francis Bluemel | Green Party | 291 | 8% | Not Elected |
| Peter Alexander Virgo | Integrity Southampton | 236 | 7% | Not Elected |
| John Robert Charles Dennis | Liberal Democrats | 221 | 6% | Not Elected |

== Transport links ==
Harefield has had several different local bus services over the years. It now only has the number 13 First Bus service that goes to Bitterne, Woolston, and the City Centre with no bus service on Sundays.

== Public Art ==
Harefield is also known for its public art, including the Mosaic Way; a trail of permanent mosaics that were created by local residents and installed in 2021
