= Cobden Bridge =

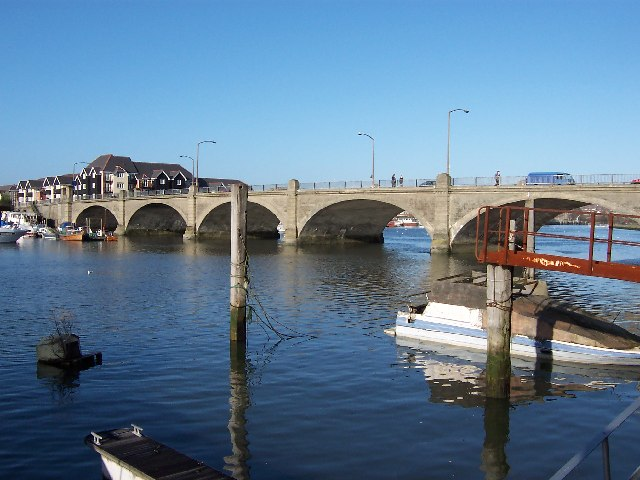
- Cobden Bridge from Bitterne Park
- Coordinates: 50°55′28″N 1°22′42″W
- Carries: 2 road lanes; 2 bike lanes; 2 footways
- Crosses: River Itchen
- Locale: Bitterne Park, St Denys (both in Southampton)
- Maintained by: Southampton City Council
- Preceded by: Woodmill
- Followed by: St Denys Railway Bridge

Characteristics
- Clearance above: open

History
- Construction start: 1882 (original); 1926 (current)
- Construction end: 1883 (original); 1928 (current)
- Opened: 1883 (original); 1928 (current)

Location
- Interactive map of Cobden Bridge

Cobden Bridge is a major road bridge in Southampton, UK. It crosses the River Itchen joining the suburbs of St Denys and Bitterne Park. It forms part of the A3035. The present bridge dates from 1928, but there has been a bridge on this site since 1883.

== The first bridge (1883) ==
The National Liberal Land Company purchased the land that is now Bitterne Park in 1882, and began developing it for residential purposes. An iron bridge was constructed across the Itchen to St Denys, thus improving access and vastly increasing the value of the land.

The bridge was opened with the promise to be "free to the public for ever" and was originally called the "Cobden Free Bridge". This was in clear competition to Northam Bridge further south, which at that time was a toll bridge.

The bridge was named Cobden Bridge after Richard Cobden, a prominent Liberal politician. Cobden was notable as a campaigner for free trade, and formed the Anti-Corn Law League. The bridge was opened on 27 June 1883 by Thorold Rogers, another Liberal politician and friend of Cobden, who was also chairman of the Land Company.

The original bridge had five spans of 72 feet 6 inches (22.10 m) with headway below the bridge of 15 feet (4.6 m) at high water and 27 feet (8.2 m) at low water. The bridge was supported by iron piers, cylindrical in shape and 7 feet (2.1 m) in diameter below the water and 4 feet 6 inches (1.37 m) above it. The two centre piers extended 23 feet (7.0 m) below the water level and the outer two were 15 feet (4.6 m) deep. The abutments were made of concrete and although the piers were made of cast iron, they were also filled with concrete. The piers were topped with two lattice girders 5 feet 10 inches (1.78 m) deep and divided into 5 feet 10 inches (1.78 m)-long panels, set 28 feet (8.5 m) apart from one another. The bridge carried a 16 feet (4.9 m)-wide carriageway with a 6 feet (1.8 m)-wide footway on both sides. In all the bridge contained 287 short tons (260 t) of wrought iron and 191 short tons (173 t) of cast iron. The engineer was Corbet Woodall of Westminster.

The bridge was the site of several clashes between local gangs soon after opening.

== The second bridge (1928) ==
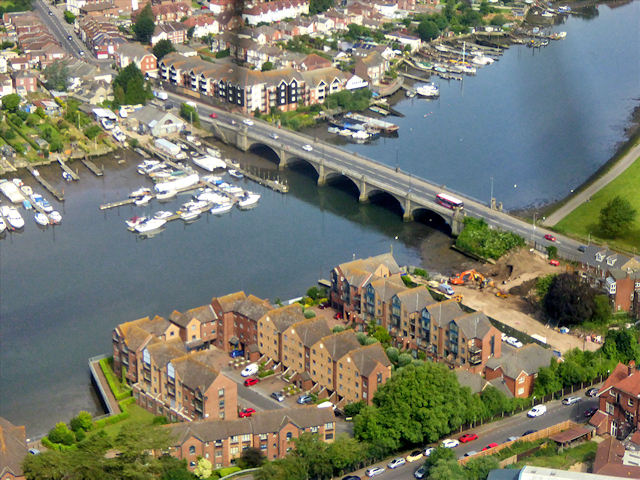
Aerial view of the bridge in 2016

A new five arch concrete bridge was built between 1926 and 1928, to better cope with the increases in size and volume of traffic.

The new bridge was opened on 25 October 1928 by Wilfrid Ashley, then Minister of Transport.
