= SO postcode area =

Postcode area within the United Kingdom

Southampton
- Postcode area
- Coordinates: 50.938°N 1.389°W
- Country: United Kingdom
- Postcode area: SO
- Postcode area name: Southampton
- Post towns: 9
- Postcode districts: 30
- Postcode sectors: 179
- Postcodes (live): 18,298
- Postcodes (total): 40,011
- Statistics as at May 2020

The SO postcode area, also known as the Southampton postcode area, is a group of 23 postcode districts in southern England, within nine post towns. These cover south and central Hampshire, including Southampton, Winchester, Alresford, Brockenhurst, Eastleigh, Lymington, Lyndhurst, Romsey and Stockbridge.

The SO area originally had both single and double-digit postcode districts. From the inception of postcodes in Southampton, "large users" within the SO1 and SO2 postcode areas (which broadly covered the area of the city) were allocated SO9 postcodes. In the early 1990s, a shortage of available postcodes occurred due to increased demand. On 1 December 1993 Royal Mail took the step of dividing each of the existing single-digit districts, the numbers of the new subdivisions containing two digits rather than one. For example, the SO1 and SO2 districts were divided into SO14-19. At the same time, ordinary "geographical" postcodes replaced the SO9 codes. Whilst this created thousands more possible postcode combinations, it resulted in the unusual situation where the centre of the postcode area, Southampton, lacks a district numbered 1. The area is one of only a few in the country where this is the case.

The regional processing centre in Southampton handles incoming and outgoing mail from across the entire PO, SO and SP areas, as well as some outgoing mail from Dorset imported to make best use of Southampton's higher processing capacity.

== Coverage ==
The approximate coverage of the postcode districts:

Postcode district	Post town	Coverage	Local authority area(s)
SO14	SOUTHAMPTON	City Centre, St. Mary's, Newtown, Nicholstown, Northam, Ocean Village, Chapel, Eastern Docks, Bevois Valley	Southampton
SO15	SOUTHAMPTON	Shirley, Freemantle, Regents Park, Banister Park, Polygon, Millbrook, Maybush Redbridge	Southampton
SO16	SOUTHAMPTON	Bassett, Lordswood, Lordshill, Redbridge, Rownhams, Nursling, Chilworth, Shirley Warren	Southampton, Test Valley
SO17	SOUTHAMPTON	Highfield, Portswood, St Denys, Swaythling	Southampton
SO18	SOUTHAMPTON	Bitterne, Bitterne Park, Harefield, Townhill Park, Chartwell Green, Mansbridge, Southampton Airport	Eastleigh, Southampton
SO19	SOUTHAMPTON	Sholing, Merry Oak, Thornhill, Woolston, Weston	Southampton
SO20	STOCKBRIDGE	Stockbridge, King's Somborne, Middle Wallop	Test Valley
SO21	WINCHESTER	Compton, Colden Common, Easton, Hursley, Itchen Abbas, Martyr Worthy, Micheldever, Micheldever Station, Owslebury, Shawford, South Wonston, Sutton Scotney, Sparsholt, Twyford	Winchester
SO22	WINCHESTER	Badger Farm, Fulflood, Hursley, Littleton and Harestock, Olivers Battery, Pitt, St Cross (W), Stanmore, Weeke	Winchester
SO23	WINCHESTER	City Centre, Abbotts Barton, Bar End, Highcliffe, Hyde, St Cross (E), Winnall	Winchester
SO24	ALRESFORD	New Alresford, Old Alresford, Cheriton, Tichborne, Ropley	Winchester
SO25	WINCHESTER	Bulk users	non-geographic
SO30	SOUTHAMPTON	Botley, Hedge End, West End, Curbridge	Eastleigh, Winchester
SO31	SOUTHAMPTON	Warsash, Hamble-le-Rice, Locks Heath Netley Abbey	Eastleigh, Fareham
SO32	SOUTHAMPTON	Bishop's Waltham, Corhampton, Curdridge, Droxford, Durley, Exton, Meonstoke, Shedfield, Soberton, Swanmore, Upham, Warnford, Wickham	Eastleigh, Winchester
SO40	SOUTHAMPTON	Totton, Cadnam, Marchwood	New Forest
SO40	LYNDHURST	Lyndhurst	New Forest
SO41	LYMINGTON	Lymington, Milford-on-Sea, Pennington, Boldre, Hordle, Sway	New Forest
SO42	BROCKENHURST	Beaulieu, Brockenhurst, East Boldre	New Forest
SO43	LYNDHURST	Lyndhurst, Minstead, Bramshaw	New Forest
SO45	SOUTHAMPTON	Hythe, Fawley, Blackfield, Calshot, Hardley	New Forest
SO50	EASTLEIGH	Town Centre, Boyatt Wood, Fair Oak, Bishopstoke, Horton Heath	Eastleigh
SO51	ROMSEY	Romsey, Ampfield, Lockerley, Mottisfont, Wellow	Test Valley
SO52	SOUTHAMPTON	North Baddesley	Test Valley
SO53	EASTLEIGH	Chandler's Ford	Eastleigh, Test Valley
SO97	SOUTHAMPTON	Jobcentre Plus	non-geographic

== Map ==
SO postcode area map, showing postcode districts in red and post towns in grey text, with links to nearby BH, GU, PO, RG and SP postcode areas.

== See also ==
- Postcode Address File
- List of postcode areas in the United Kingdom
