= Peartree (ward) =

Electoral ward of Southampton, England

Coordinates: 50.907°N 1.373°W

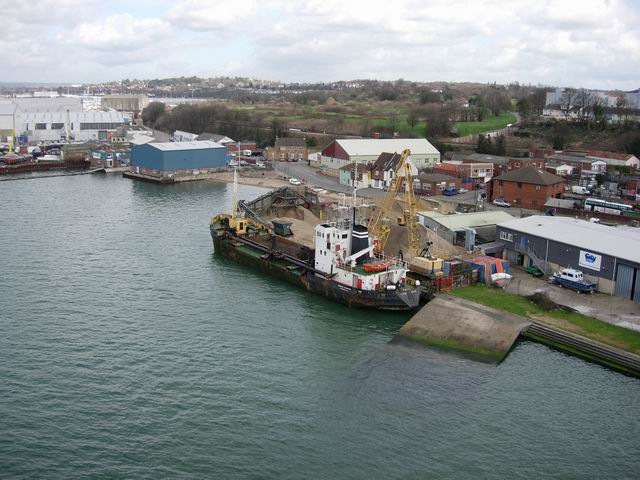
Part of Peartree Ward

Peartree Ward is an Electoral Ward in the Unitary Authority of Southampton, England.

It covers the suburbs of Merry Oak, Peartree Green and Itchen, and is bordered (clockwise from south-west) by Bargate Ward, Bevois Ward, Bitterne Park Ward, Harefield Ward, Sholing Ward, and Woolston Ward.

Notable residents include Member of Parliament for Southampton Itchen and George Medal recipient Royston Smith.
