= Bitterne Park =

Suburb of Southampton, England

Coordinates: 50.9238°N 1.3718°W

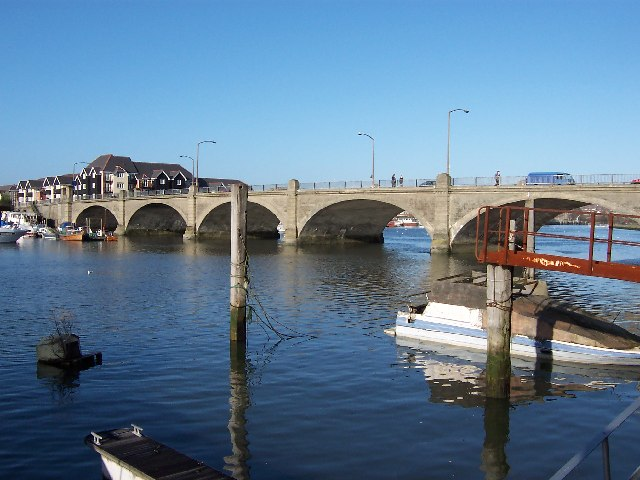
- Cobden Bridge crosses the River Itchen at Bitterne Park

- Location within Southampton
- Population: 14,026 (2011 Census. Ward)
- Unitary authority: Southampton
- Ceremonial county: Hampshire
- Region: South East
- Country: England
- Sovereign state: United Kingdom
- Post town: SOUTHAMPTON
- Postcode district: SO18
- Dialling code: 023
- Police: Hampshire and Isle of Wight
- Fire: Hampshire and Isle of Wight
- Ambulance: South Central
- UK Parliament: Southampton Itchen

Bitterne Park is a suburb and Electoral Ward of Southampton, England, on the Eastern bank of the River Itchen, built on sloping parkland which once formed part of Bitterne Manor.

Bitterne Park Ward includes the suburbs of Bitterne Park, Bitterne Manor, Midanbury and Townhill Park, and had a population of 14,026 at the 2011 Census. The ward is bounded by Bevois, Portswood and Swaythling wards across the River Itchen to the west, and Harefield and Peartree wards to the east.

== History ==
A Bronze Age hoard mostly consisting of axe heads was found at Bond Road in 1894.

The National Liberal Land Company purchased the land that is now Bitterne Park in 1882, and began developing it for residential purposes. An iron bridge was constructed across the Itchen to St Denys, thus improving access and vastly increasing the value of the land.

== Local area ==
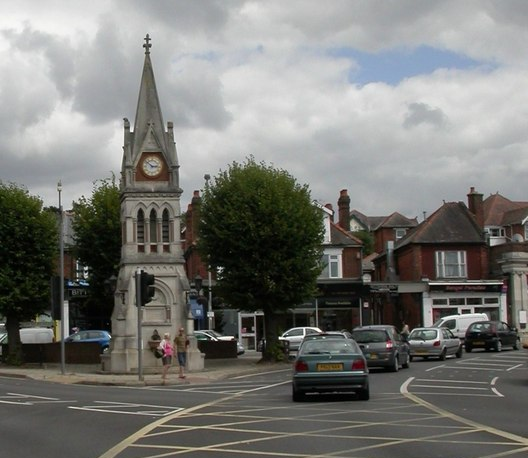
The clock tower at Bitterne Park Triangle.

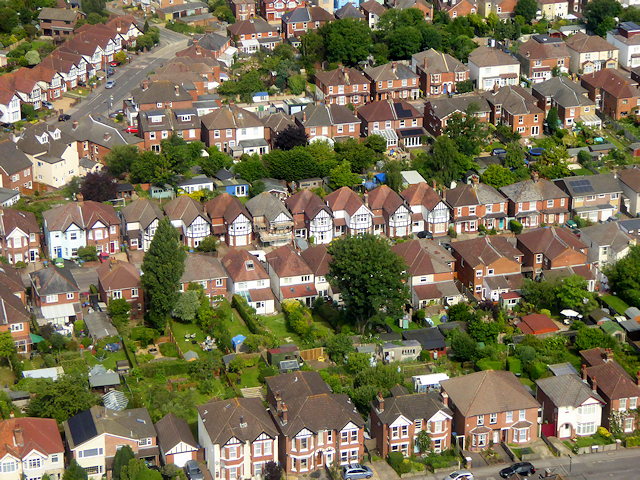
Aerial view of housing in Bitterne Park in 2016

The area is largely residential, with Bitterne Park Triangle as its focal point. A number of shops cluster around the Triangle.

There have been no banking facilities since the closure of NatWest's Triangle branch in the 1990s and later the Post Office branch, in 2005; however, there are three cash machines. There are a number of take-away restaurants in Bitterne Park Triangle, including a fish and chip shop, a kebab house, Chinese restaurants, an American pizza house, Thai restaurants and an Indian restaurant. There are various other facilities available such as a laundrette, convenience stores, craft beer pub, hairdresser, barbers and a bakery.

Bitterne Park is also home to several schools and local library. Since 2008 the Church of the Ascension has contained the lightest ring of twelve bells in the world.

Bitterne Park is at the Eastern end of Cobden Bridge, which links the area to St. Denys on the Western bank of the River Itchen. The Southern section of Southampton's Riverside Park is located in Bitterne Park. Riverside Park is host to a 1/5 mile miniature railway, children's play areas, two cricket pitches, a tennis court, a skate park, and several football pitches. The total size of Riverside Park is 32 hectares.
