= Woodlands Community College =

Coordinates: 50.919°N 1.339°W

Location
- Minstead Avenue; Southampton, Hampshire; England

Information
- Type: Foundation school
- Motto: Respect Responsibility Resilience
- Local authority: Southampton
- Trust: Reach Cooperative Trust
- Department for Education URN: 116465 Tables
- Ofsted: Reports
- Head teacher: Jim Henderson (2018-present)
- Gender: Mixed
- Age: 11 to 16
- Enrolment: 600
- Website: woodlands.southampton.sch.uk

Woodlands Community College is a mixed secondary school located in east Southampton, Hampshire, in the south of England. It was officially opened as a specialist school for science and engineering by MP David Miliband on 26 January 2005.

The last Ofsted inspection was in 2019, when the school was judged as Requiring Improvement. but most recent inspection lead to the rating of Good.
