= St Denys railway station =

Railway station in Hampshire, England

St Denys
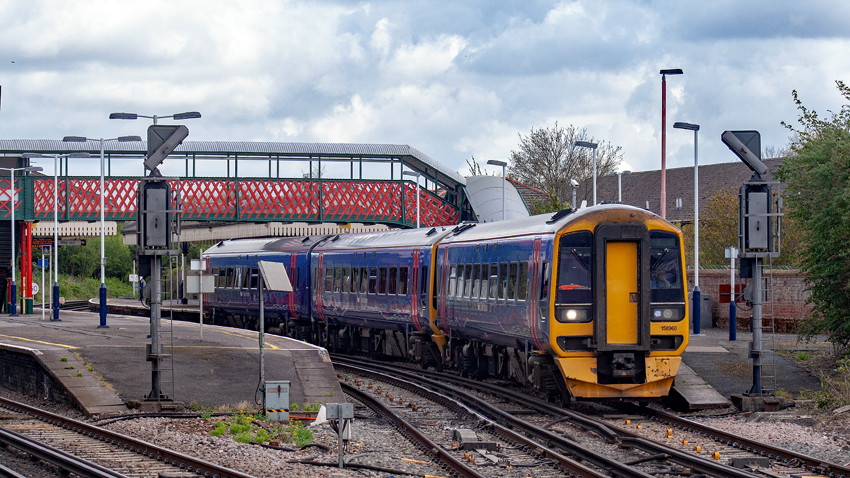
- Portsmouth line train at St Denys

General information
- Location: St Denys, City of Southampton; England
- Coordinates: 50°55′19″N 1°23′17″W
- Grid reference: SU431138
- Managed by: South Western Railway
- Platforms: 4

Other information
- Station code: SDN
- Classification: DfT category E

History
- Original company: London and South Western Railway
- Pre-grouping: London and South Western Railway
- Post-grouping: Southern Railway

Key dates
- 1 May 1861: First station opened as Portswood
- 5 March 1866: Station relocated
- 1 January 1876: Renamed St Denys

Passengers
- 2020/21: ▼68,914
- Interchange: ▼11,304
- 2021/22: ▲0.148 million
- Interchange: ▲31,499
- 2022/23: ▲0.176 million
- Interchange: ▲34,969
- 2023/24: ▲0.208 million
- Interchange: ▼29,184
- 2024/25: ▲0.233 million
- Interchange: ▲44,971
Location
Notes
- Passenger statistics from the Office of Rail and Road

St Denys railway station serves the St Denys and Portswood suburbs of Southampton in Hampshire, England. It is 77 miles 10 chains (124.1 km) down the line from London Waterloo.

Built in 1865, the station is named after the surrounding area, which in turn is named after the Priory of St Denys, a major landmark in medieval Southampton.

The station is at the site of the junction between the South West Main Line and the West Coastway Line running between Southampton and Portsmouth. It is currently served exclusively by South Western Railway, although historically there were some additional trains operated by Southern. There are four platforms; two on the South West Main line and two on the West Coastway line.

== History ==
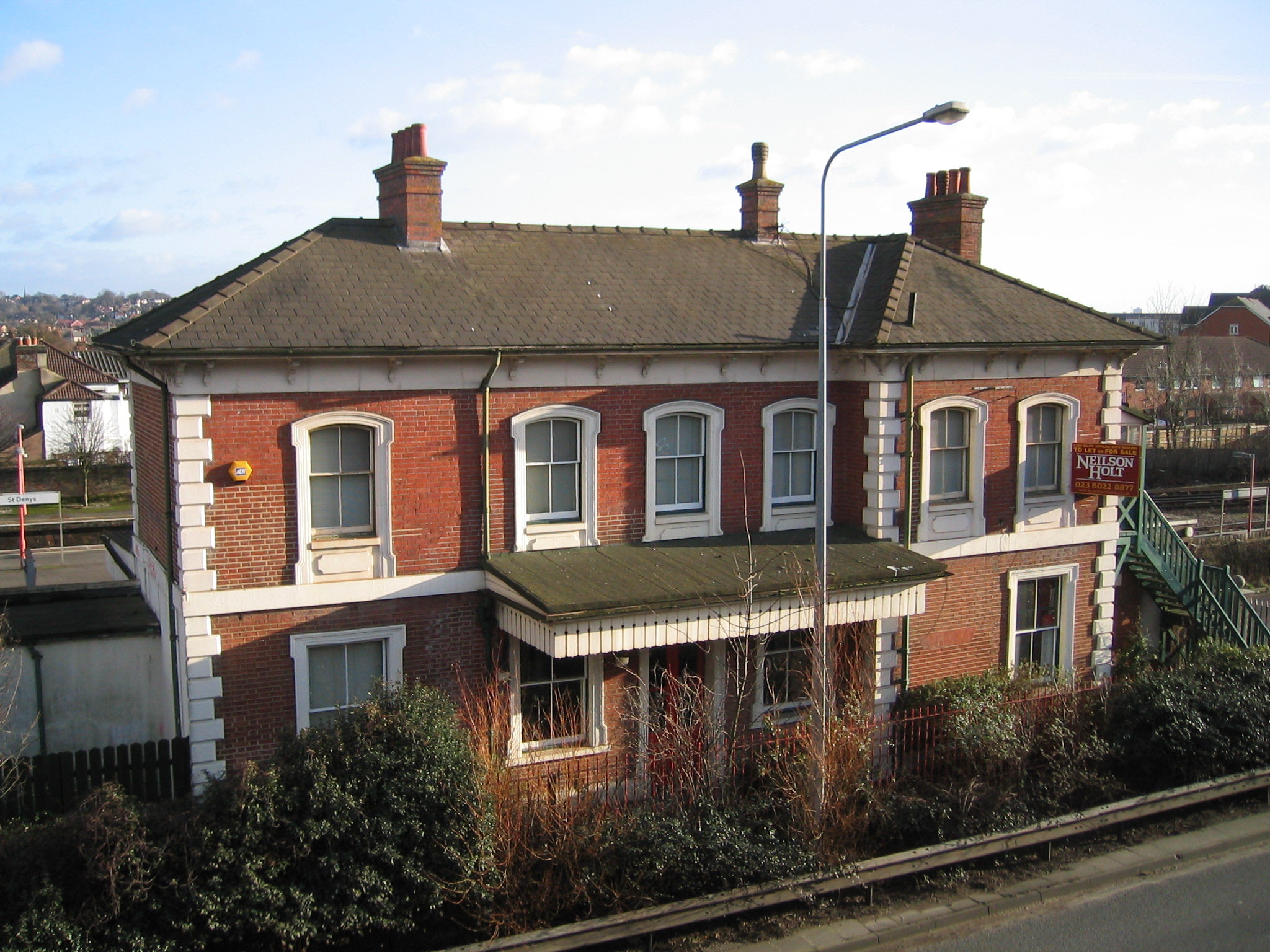
St Denys station building (now in private ownership)

The original station was opened by the London and South Western Railway on 1 May 1861 and named Portswood after the small village to the west of the main line. Shortly after, to accommodate the Portsmouth branch line, a new station building was built 0.25 miles (0.40 km) to the south; the relocated station was opened on 5 March 1866. However to avoid confusion with Portsmouth, the station was renamed to St Denys on 1 January 1876.

The station buildings themselves are fine examples of the Victorian Italianate classical style architecture introduced to the LSWR by William Tite. The original 1867 station building on platform 1 is Grade II listed, now privately owned and renamed Drummond House. Platforms 2 and 3 house the waiting room and ticket window, whilst the old station buildings on platform 4 house The Solent Model Railway Group, a local organisation.

== Services ==
All services at St Denys are operated by South Western Railway.

The typical off-peak service in trains per hour is:

- 1 tph to Portsmouth & Southsea
- 1 tph to Romsey via Eastleigh
- 1 tph to Southampton Central
- 1 tph to Salisbury via Redbridge

Additional services, including trains to and from London Waterloo, Basingstoke, Winchester and Bournemouth call at the station during the peak hours.

Preceding station	National Rail	Following station
Swaythling	South Western Railway South West Main Line	Southampton Central
Bitterne	South Western Railway West Coastway Line	Southampton Central
Disused railways
Swaythling	British Rail Southern Region South West Main Line	Northam

== Accidents and incidents ==
- In August 1939, a train overran signals and was derailed by trap points. The accident caused a set of points to move, diverting an approaching boat train. This averted a more serious accident, as wreckage was foul of the route the boat train should have taken.
- On 14 August 1940, a passenger train, hauled by SR Lord Nelson class 4-6-0 No. 860 Lord Hawke, was derailed due to enemy action. A bomb fell on the line ahead of the train, which was unable to stop in time.
- On 29 October 1959, a passenger train, hauled by SR West Country Class 4-6-2 No. 34020 Seaton, overran signals and was derailed by trap points.
- On 12 December 1960, a passenger train, hauled by SR West Country Class 4-6-2 No. 34022 Exmoor, overran signals and was derailed. Two people were injured.
- On 28 February 2022 a scooter was thrown onto the tracks at the station, causing a short circuit with the third rail electrical supply. Eyewitnesses reported that the subsequent electrical arcing caused flames so bright that it "looked like daytime".
