= Northam, Southampton =

Suburb of Southampton, England

Coordinates: 50.9124°N 1.391°W

Northam
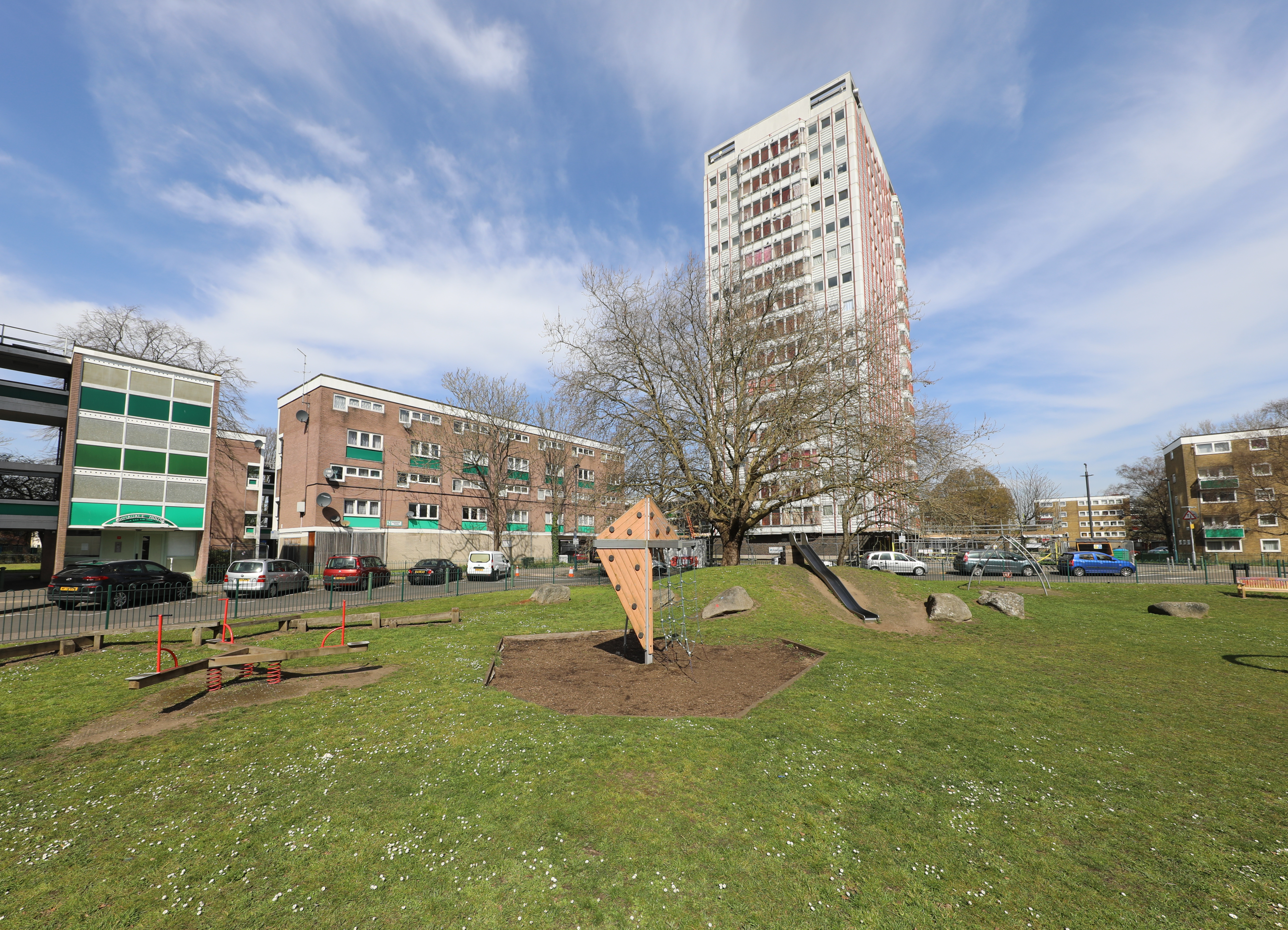
- The Millbank Tower dominates the Northam skyline

- Location within Southampton
- Unitary authority: Southampton
- Ceremonial county: Hampshire
- Region: South East
- Country: England
- Sovereign state: United Kingdom
- Post town: SOUTHAMPTON
- Postcode district: SO14
- Dialling code: 023
- Police: Hampshire and Isle of Wight
- Fire: Hampshire and Isle of Wight
- Ambulance: South Central
- UK Parliament: Southampton Test

Northam is a suburb of Southampton in Hampshire. On the West bank of the River Itchen, it shares borders with St Mary's, Bitterne and Bevois Valley. Beside the border with St Mary's is the Chapel area, which has been home to some recent apartment building developments in Northam. The A3024 road runs through the suburb and crosses the Northam Bridge, which links Northam with Bitterne via Bitterne Manor. Although St Mary's Stadium takes its name from the neighbouring St Mary's, the stadium itself is in Northam, and home to Southampton F.C.

== History ==
The Chapel of St. Mary de Graces also known as trinity chapel from which the area of chapel may take its name is first recorded in 1225.

In 1549 it was decided that the inhabitants of Northam had no rights of common over Southampton Common. A map of the area from 1560 shows a building on the site of what is now the Old Farmhouse pub. An engraving in the brickwork dates part of the buildings to 1611. The chapel appears to have ceased to be used as a result of the Dissolution of the monasteries and was certainly no longer being used by 1563 when a man named Thomas Gardiner attempted to purchase it.

Northam shipyard was established in 1693 after John Winter purchased the Manor of Northam for that purpose. Around the same time Chapel Yard was set up close to the site of the modern Itchen bridge.

In 1781 a factory in Chapel making biscuit tins became the first in Southampton to have a steam engine. The Northam branch of the Salisbury and Southampton Canal was built in the area in the 1790s. It was abandoned in the following decade.

The first Northam Road Bridge was built in 1796. The original bridge was made of wood. In the first decade of the 19th century the Chapel shipyard was replaced with wharves. During Victorian times, much of Southampton's industry was based around the banks of the Itchen

From 1840 Northam was home to the Northam iron works owned (along with Millbrook foundry) by Summers and Day. The first ship was launched from the yard 14 October 1840. Named Pride of the waters (later Ruby) the ship was noted at the time to be the first ship to be constructed from iron in the various shipyards of the river Itchen. Shortly afterwards (by 1842) John Rubie opened a third shipyard just downstream of the Summers and Day yard. Around the same time more housing started to be built in the area to house the workers employed by the newly expanded Southampton docks.

In 1888 Northam Primary School was built on Peel road to a design by Edwin Howell.

Steamship companies (such as the White Star Line and the Cunard Line) were major employers in the district in the early 20th century. Over 350 Northam residents died aboard RMS Titanic when it foundered off the coast of Newfoundland in 1912; 125 students at one school alone were orphaned.

In the early to mid 20th century the road bridge was rebuilt and strengthened, reopening in 1954. In 1957 Southampton city council began the construction of a housing estate that including the 16 floor Millbank House tower. The tower was opened 1 November 1960 by the Mayor of Southampton and was re-clad in 1988 in aluminium. At the same time the balconies were enclosed. Construction of the wider estate finished in 1965.

In 1965, further work was undertaken on the A3024, the dual carriageway which runs through Northam, to coincide with the opening of the M27 motorway.

Northam Primary School closed in July 2000.

=== Railways and tramways ===
The London & Southampton Railway reached Northam in 1839. For few months the line terminated at a temporary station at Northam until the Southampton Terminus station was completed.

In order to continue to Southampton Terminus railway station the line had to cross Northam road. Originally a level crossing was constructed but after a dispute with the Northam bridge company the railway agreed to build a bridge to carry the road over the railway. Construction of the bridge in brick began some time before 1840. In 1858 new junction was added connecting the line to what is now Southampton Central railway station. This required the extension of the bridge which was done by added a cast iron section The junction was altered in 1902 to reduce the sharpness of the curve which had previously limited trains to 7MPH. The sharpness of the curve was further reduced in 1980 when the number of lines down to Southampton Docks was reduced from two to one.

The first part of the Northam Quay tramway was built around the start of the 1840s. The first line connected Northam Quay to the site of the coke overns. Over the following decades the tramway was connected to other industrial sites in the area as well as the mainline railway.

The area regained a railway station when Northam railway station was opened on 1 December 1872.

The London & South Western Railway opened a large motive power depot at Northam in 1840, which remained the principal locomotive servicing facility in the area until 1903 when it was replaced by a new depot at Eastleigh. The area previously occupied by the shed then became a goods yard.

Work to replace the bridges that took Northam road over the railway began in 1907 and the new bridge opened in 1908. The New bridge was of steel construction supported by girder lattices

Northam station closed on 3 September 1966 and was demolished by the end of the decade. Northam Quay tramway closed in 1984.

In 2001, South West Trains chose Northam as the location for the maintenance facility for its new Siemens Desiro fleet of trains on the site of the former goods yard. The Northam Carriage Servicing Depot was constructed by Turner & Townsend and opened in 2003.

== Places of worship ==
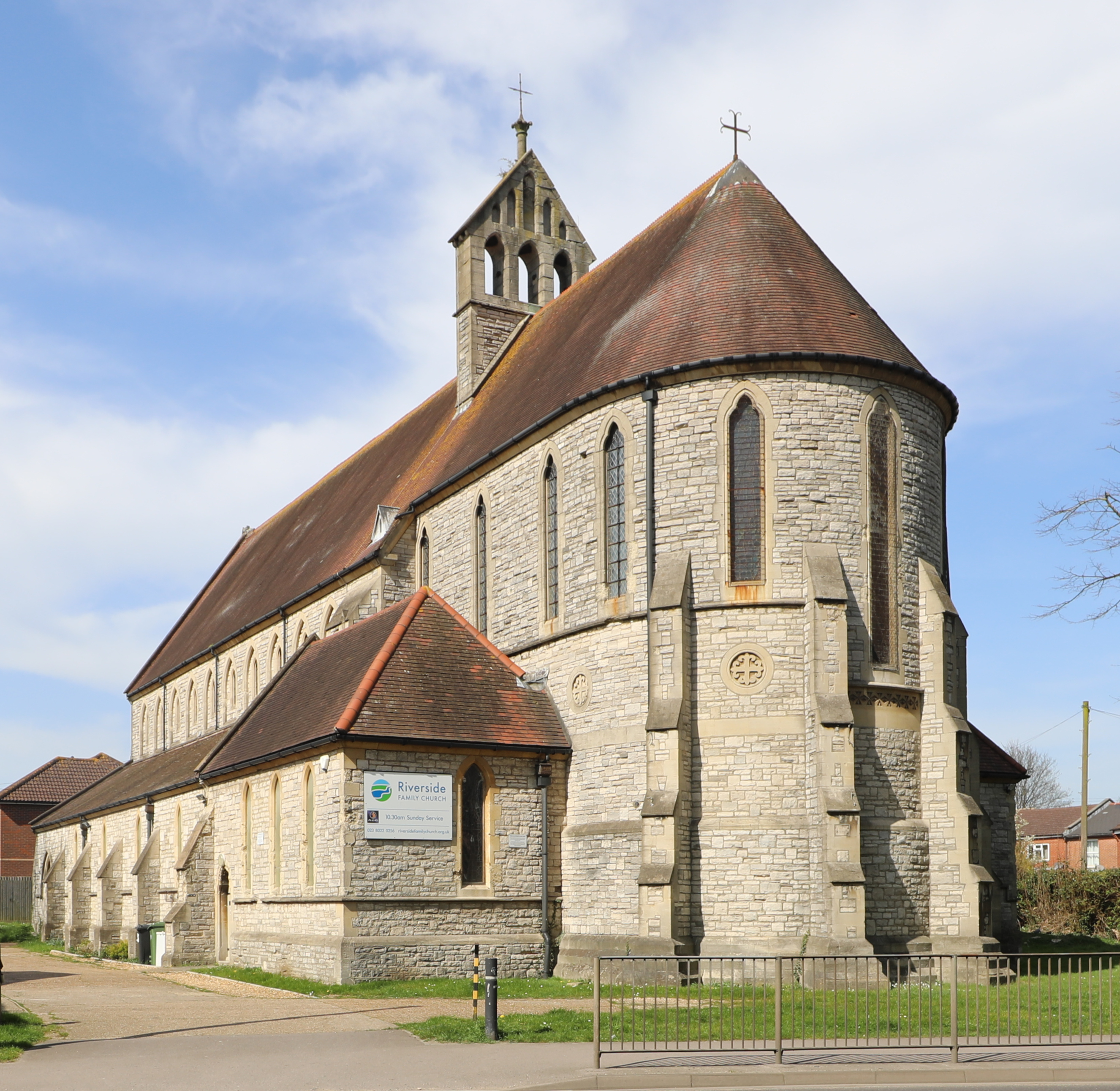
The Augustine Centre

A church was built on Graham Street in 1854 with £400 of funding from Thomas Chamberlayne. It was demolished in the 1880s.

The Augustine Centre was originally a Church of England church, and subsequently home to Northam Pentecostal Church. The church was built as St Augustine between 1881 and 1884 to a design by Henry Woodyer. It was purchased by Riverside Family Church in the early 1980s and given its new name. The building is a Grade II listed building.

Northam Primitive Methodist Church was opened in 1874. The church held its first wedding in September 1911 and it expanded to include a Sunday school in the late 1920s. By 2022 the church was no longer in use and proposals were being made to turn it into housing.

Northam Congregational Church was built on Belvidere Terrace in the 1850s with space for around 400 people. It was destroyed by bombing during World War 2.

== Television Centre, Southampton ==
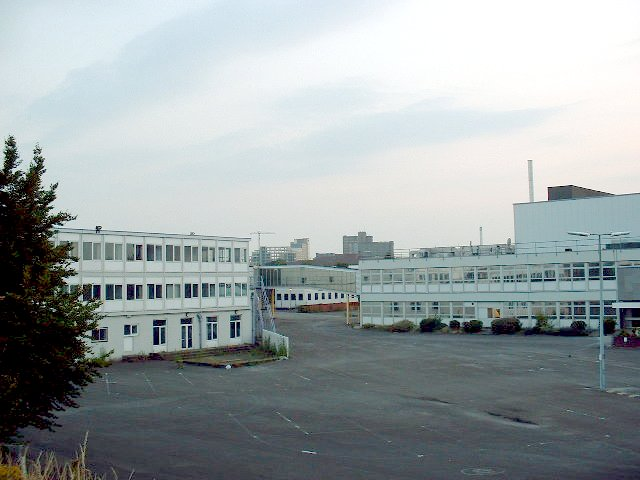
The television studios, demolished in 2009

Northam was home to Television Centre, Southampton, run by ITV franchises Meridian Broadcasting, TVS (Television South) and Southern Television, before Meridian moved their operations to Whiteley. As well as the regional news magazine programme Meridian Tonight, the studios were originally home to the very first series of the popular game show Catchphrase (before it moved to Maidstone Studios) and handled transmission of Meridian, Anglia and HTV West, as well as Saturday morning children's programmes like The Saturday Banana. The first attempt to redevelop the site failed in 2009 when the developer went into administration. In 2014, Inland Homes announced plans to develop the site as a residential area. Building work started in 2016 and by late 2023 Inland Homes had completed two blocks of apartments and begun a third before entering administration on 17 October.
