= The Polygon, Southampton =

Area of Southampton, England

Coordinates: 50.9098°N 1.4092°W

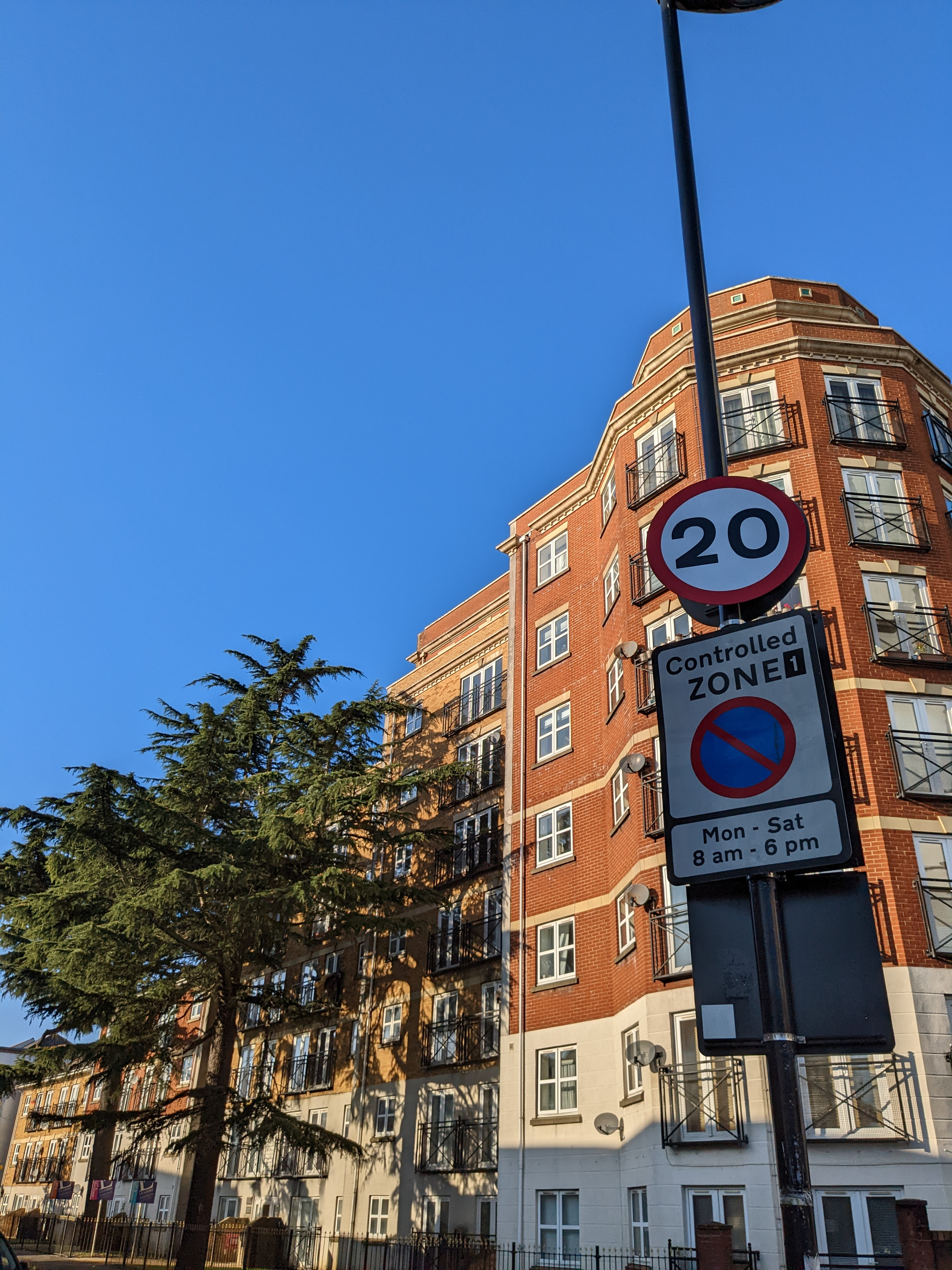
The Polygon

The Polygon (or simply Polygon) is an area in the city of Southampton, England.

The area is located north of the Western Esplanade, Commercial Road and Cumberland Place; east of Hill Lane and Rollesbrook Greenway; south of Archers Road; and west of Dorset street and The Avenue (A33). The area notably encompass Watts Park, Southampton Central railway station, Southampton Courts of Justice and the Maritime & Coastguard Agency. The residential area consists of largely Edwardian red brick houses.

== History ==
The name originates from a planned grand 22-acre (89,000 m^{2}) development in this area – a twelve-sided polygon that would comprise houses, hotels, assembly rooms and a tavern. The design was the brainchild of architect Jacob Leroux, who saw it as Southampton's answer to Bath's Royal Crescent. Construction began in 1768, but only the hotel and three houses were completed when one of the investors went bankrupt and the project stalled. The hotel opened in 1773, although it did not do very good business.

In the Victorian era, many more houses, typical of the time, were built on the surrounding land, forming the area and buildings known as The Polygon today.

The original Polygon Hotel was demolished in the 1780s; a new Polygon Hotel was constructed in Victorian times, which became a notable place to stay in Southampton, with guests including boxer Muhammad Ali, and comedians Tommy Cooper and Morecambe and Wise. Many passengers on the RMS Titanic had stayed here before sailing. The hotel fell into decline, however, and was replaced in 1999 with a block of flats.

== Education ==
There is a secondary school: St Anne's Catholic School, a primary school: Springhill Catholic Primary School, a SEN school: The Polygon School and a language college: Southampton Language College.

== Places of interest ==
- St Edmunds Roman Catholic Church
- St Marks Church Centre
- Romero Halls of Residence
- Southampton & New Forest Magistrates
- Southampton Courts of Justice
- Maritime & Coastguard Agency
- Watts Park
- Southampton Central railway station
- The Polygon Park and Sandhurst Allotments
- Bedford Place
