= Bevois Valley =

Suburb of Southampton, England

Coordinates: 50.9194°N 1.3932°W

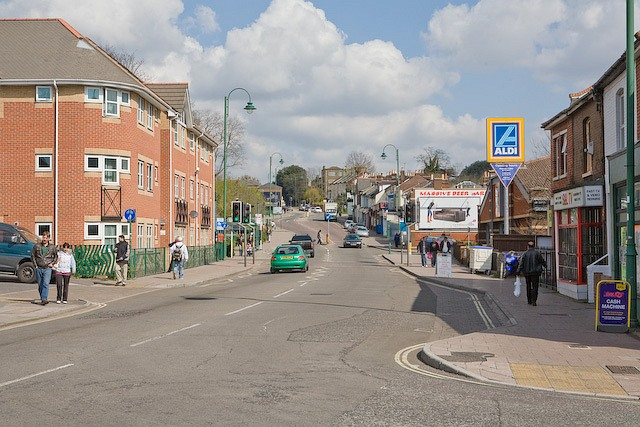
- Shops on Bevois Valley Road

- Location within Southampton
- Unitary authority: Southampton
- Ceremonial county: Hampshire
- Region: South East
- Country: England
- Sovereign state: United Kingdom
- Post town: SOUTHAMPTON
- Postcode district: SO14
- Dialling code: 023
- Police: Hampshire and Isle of Wight
- Fire: Hampshire and Isle of Wight
- Ambulance: South Central
- UK Parliament: Southampton Test

Bevois Valley (/ˈbiːvɪs/ BEE-vis) is an inner city area of Southampton, England, within Bevois Electoral Ward, and includes areas called Bevois Town and Bevois Mount. The area lies south of and adjoins Portswood and is within easy walking distance of the city centre. It follows the line of the original valley of the River Itchen and as such the land is primarily clays and shingles. The area apparently gains its name from a folk lore hero called Bevis of Hampton and his giant companion Ascapart.

Bevois Valley has a primary school (Bevois Town Primary School), three churches, (St. Barnabas Church in Lodge Road, a Baptist chapel in Southcliff Road and a small church in Ancasta Road). The nearest railway station is St Denys railway station. Along with the nearby Bedford Place, it is a popular area for nightlife, with various takeaways, pubs, nightclubs, and small venues offering live music. Since 2001, the area has been home to the Eilis O'Connell sculpture Shear.
