= Freemantle =

Suburb and electoral ward in Southampton, England

Coordinates: 50.9117°N 1.4265°W

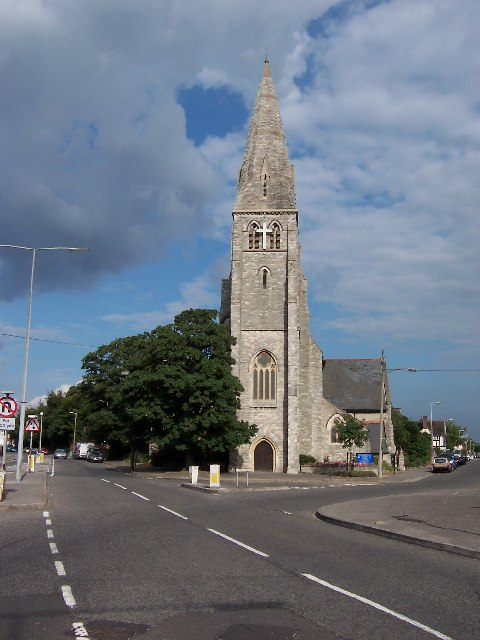
- Christ Church, Freemantle

- Location within Southampton
- Unitary authority: Southampton
- Ceremonial county: Hampshire
- Region: South East
- Country: England
- Sovereign state: United Kingdom
- Post town: SOUTHAMPTON
- Postcode district: SO15
- Dialling code: 023
- Police: Hampshire and Isle of Wight
- Fire: Hampshire and Isle of Wight
- Ambulance: South Central
- UK Parliament: Southampton Test

Freemantle is a suburb and electoral ward in Southampton, England.

There are similarly named places in Hampshire: notably Henry II's hunting lodge in Kingsclere; an area near Hannington; and Freemantle Common in Bitterne. These were formerly thought to be French names meaning "cold cloak", but are now known to derive from the word fromental, meaning a wheat-field.

== History ==
Freemantle was originally a large house and estate within the parish of Millbrook and before that was a farm house and land within that same parish. In 1851 it was deemed a separate parish, although some sources still refer to Freemantle as being part of Millbrook. The Freemantle House and Estate was sold by its last owner, Sir George Henry Hewett in 1852, and was bought by Sampson Payne, a local property developer. Sampson Payne was not only a merchant and local property developer, he was a town councillor of many years standing, and also was Mayor of Southampton from 1854 to 1856. He disposed of the land in smaller parcels ranging in value from £20 to £100 to various property developers and building societies. Within a short time, he had also intersected the park by nearly twenty roads.

Freemantle began to be built up in the 1850s and is still mostly small Victorian semi detached and terraced houses. The school was built in 1857 and the Church was completed in 1865. From 1880 to 1895, it was administered jointly with Shirley by the Shirley and Freemantle Urban District Council, initially set up as a Local Board of Health. In 1895 Freemantle was incorporated into Southampton borough.

== Christ Church Freemantle ==
The parish church for Freemantle is Christ Church. The origins of a church community begin however in 1856, when a church meeting took place in the Bailiffs House, and then later church services took place in the school rooms. On 25 July 1861, the foundation stone of the church was laid by Archdeacon Jacob and on 27 July 1865 the church was consecrated by Dr Sumner, Bishop of Winchester. On 19 April 1866 the Ecclesiastical Commission of England agreed that Freemantle would be a separate district from Millbrook, and declared the new Church of the Parish of Christ Church, Freemantle. The tower and spire were added in 1875.

== Freemantle Common ==
Rather confusingly perhaps, there is also a Freemantle Common in Southampton, although this is a considerable distance from Freemantle itself, in the suburb of Bitterne.

== Civil Service Sports Ground ==
The main patch of green space in Freemantle is the former Civil Service Sports Ground. Since the 18th century this 8-acre (32,000 m^{2}) field has been used for sports and community gatherings. Between 1888 and 1905, it was the home of Freemantle F.C., who were rivals to Southampton F.C., who briefly considered a merger and move to the ground in 1897.

The land was owned by the Atherley family who sold it to the Civil Service in 1927 for £5000 as a fully operational sports ground with facilities and with a covenant for sports ground use only. In the last few years of Civil Service ownership the Ground closed in 1999 after seventy years of use by Civil Service and finally the land fell into disrepair, there were arson attacks on the clubhouse in 1999, in 2003 the fencing had collapsed and there were problems of fly-tipping and at one stage travellers took up residence. After footing the bill for every cleanup operation, and a long running and concerted Residents campaign to Save The Field, the City Council investigated compulsory purchase of the site.

During 2004, the then owners of the land (Civil Service Property Holdings Ltd) put the site out for sale by closed bid informal tender. At this time local residents, the Friends of The Field, and local Conservative and Labour Councillors (supported by local MP Alan Whitehead) attempted to negotiate with the owners but to no avail.

The vast majority of the site was sold to Bovis Homes by The Civil Service Sports Association Properties Division for around £160,000, but the council had not agreed any planning permission. There is strong local and political support to ensure the site can be used for the community.

The Field was purchased by Southampton City Council after a decade of campaigning by Friends of The Field Community Association, local Councillors, MPs, MEPs, School Groups and Residents. As of 2017 The Field is still waiting it's fate. Will it be School use only or will the local Community including schools and residents be able to use The Field for Sports, Education and Recreation? Many local groups wish to group together with schools, Council and local Community to create a real Community Hub for all. The campaign continues since as of 2017 the 'Friends of The Field' Campaign has been campaigning for over 13 years. The full "politically independent" story is available on www.communityhub.info.
