= Tobias Campbell =

Tobias Campbell may refer to:

- Tobias Campbell, musician in On My Honor (band)
- Tobias Campbell, actor in Bitter Feast
- Tobias Campbell, character in Z Nation
