= Kids Can't Fly =

British pop punk band

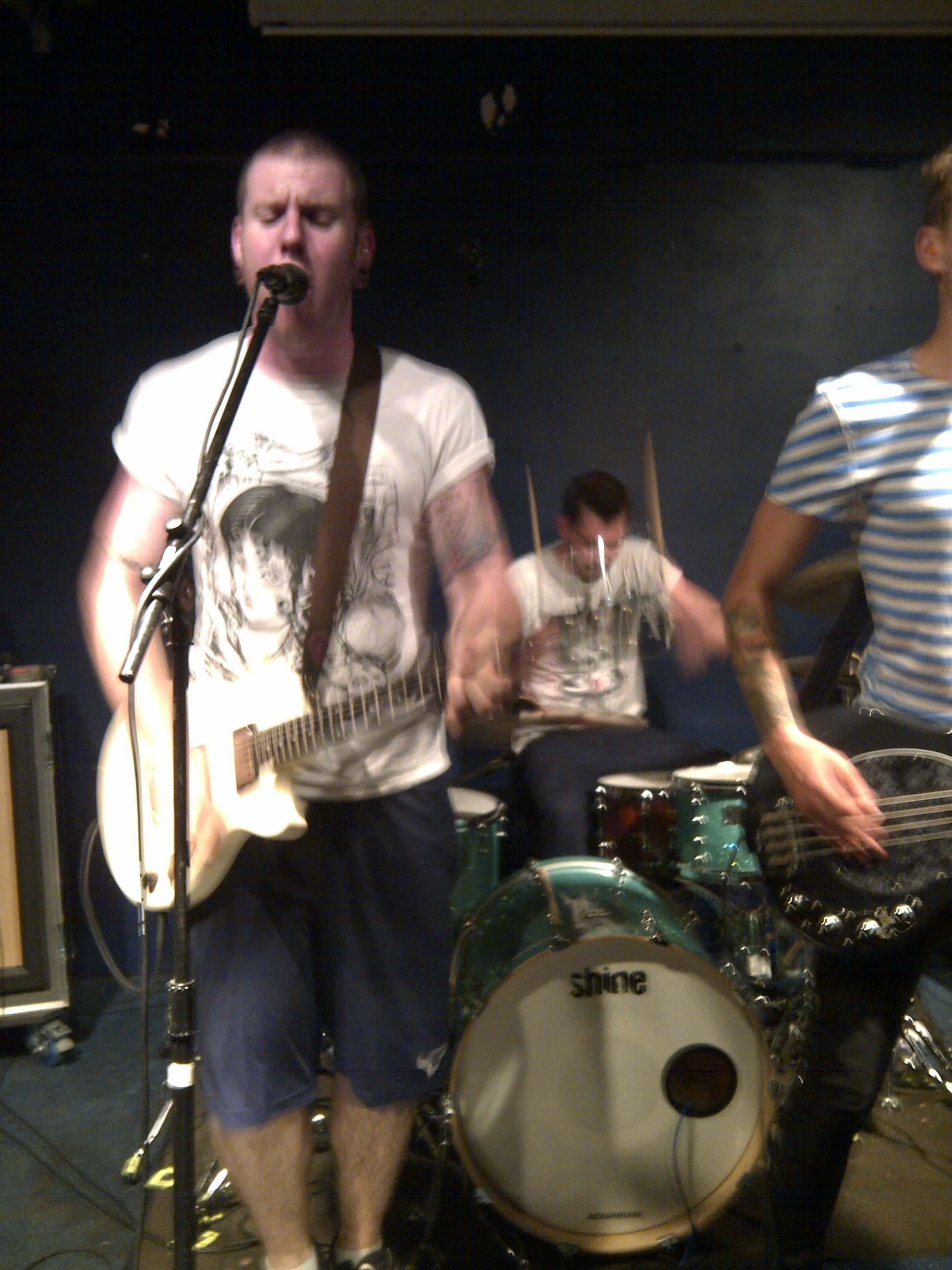
- Lead singer Robin Black in 2011.

Background information
- Origin: Southampton, United Kingdom
- Genres: Pop-punk, ska-punk
- Years active: 2006–2014
- Members: Robin Black; Dan Parkinson; Dave Matthews; Scott Wilson; Tom Dowd; Chris Booroff
- Past members: Drew Comley; Ryan Stanikk; Ash Springle; Elliott Langford; Ben Marion; Dave Ramsey; Jay Havelock; Mark Lant

Kids Can't Fly were a British pop-punk band from Southampton, United Kingdom that formed in May 2006. The line up consists of lead singer and guitarist Robin Black, bass guitarist Tom Dowd, guitarist Dan Parkinson, saxophone Dave Matthews, drummer Scott Wilson and trumpet player Chris Booroff. They have released four extended plays and four singles. The band is noted for incorporating ska and reggae influence into pop punk and has been typically described as "ska pop punk".

The band spent the first six years releasing extended plays like The Take Off EP (2006), No Joy for the Jealous (2007), Strength in Numbers (2010) and Northern Horizons (2012). In this period they also had several line-up changes because of members not feeling sure in continuing in the music industry. Vocalist Robin Black and saxophonist Dave Matthews have been constant members of the band throughout these developments, while Scott Wilson, the founding drummer departed from the band in 2011, but later rejoined in 2012. The band have planned a debut album to be released some time in early 2013, however completed their final tour in 2014.

== History ==
=== Formation and Strength in Numbers (2006–2010) ===
Kids Can't Fly formed in May 2006. The line-up initially consisted of Elliott Langford, Dave Mathews, Alex Heath, Jason Havelock, Mitz and Ryan Stanikk. All six original members were in underground rock bands around the south of England including: Zero Consent, Schoolboy Error, Fandangle, Toupé, Paul Went Home, Big Screen Buddha, Speaking of Losers, After Thought, The Generators and Harpoon Larsen and were all loosely associated to each other. But it wasn't until Ryan Stanikk and Dave Matthews decided to start their own band after several years playing in a variety of south coast bands. Not long after their formation the band undertook their first UK headline tour, upon which they sold out of their debut release, The Take Off EP.

This led to the band guest performing with Zebrahead at Sonisphere Festival 2008 as well as supporting Zebrahead in the United Kingdom in October 2008. This then led on to the band contributing their horn section for Zebrahead on their single Hell Yeah! off their album Phoenix. In July 2010, The band's first single, Everyone premièred on Kerrang! Radio, with a music video being released in late July. The band promoted the song on online social platforms by asking fans to request the song on music channels like Scuzz and Kerrang!. And by 30 July, the music video had reached number one in the Scuzz TV Most Requested chart and held the spot for a week.

The band released their third ep Strength in Numbers in November 2010 and from that was released a double A-side single for She Called Shotgun and Heartstrong on 25 November 2010. The title of the ep makes reference to their growing fanbase in the underground music scene. For the album art, the band was inspired by Sum 41's All Killer No Filler album art and decided to use submitted photos of fans and create collages of the submissions. After the original pressing of the ep was sold out two brand new cover art variants were distributed. The version of She Called Shotgun used for the single re-recorded and distinct from the version featured on their third ep. The band's second single She Called Shotgun was premièred on Kerrang! TV and the video held the number one most requested spot on Lava TV for two weeks as well as the most requested on Scuzz TV's charts for three weeks.

=== Line-up instability and Northern Horizons (2011–present) ===
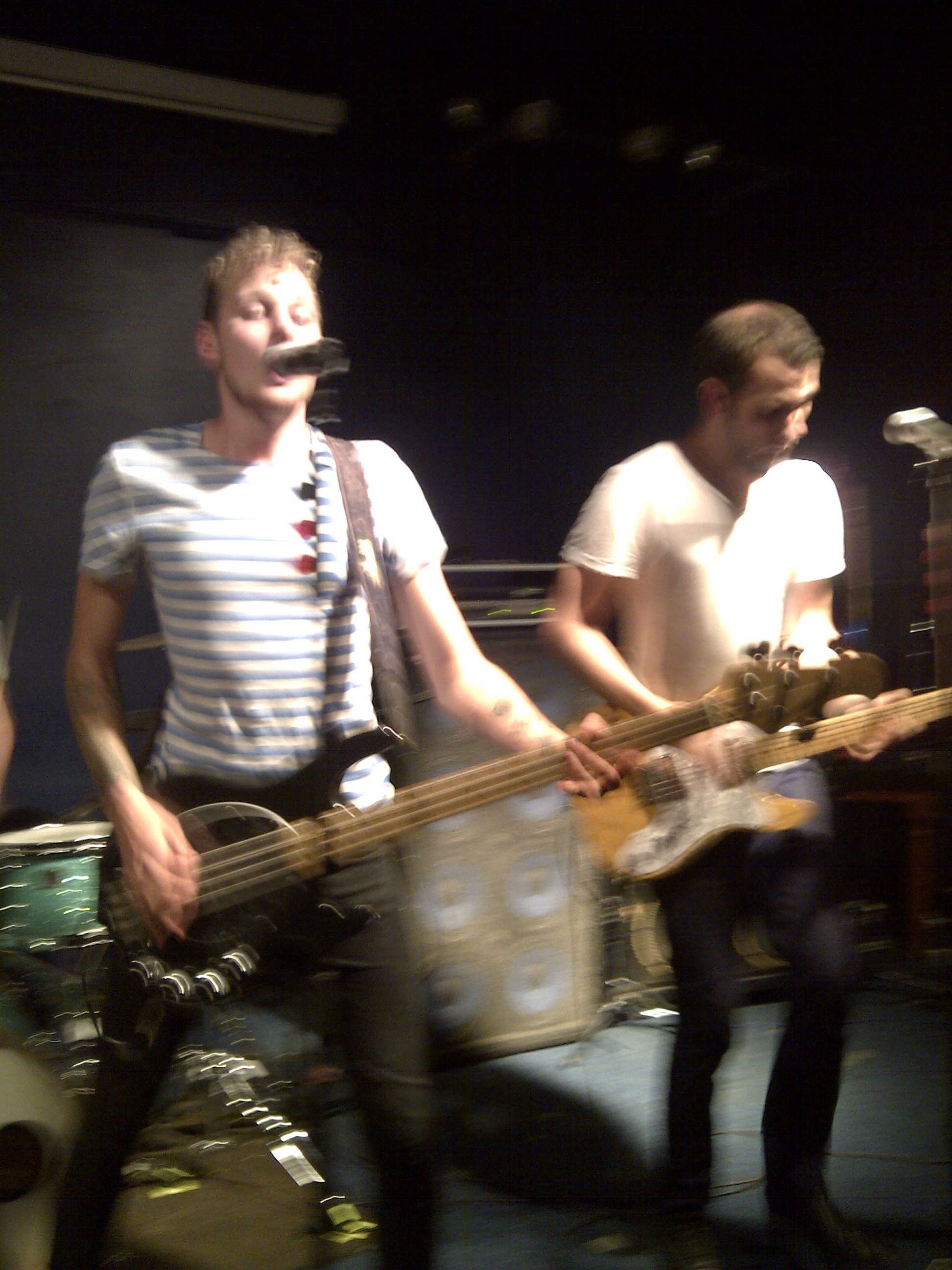
Kids Can't Fly bass guitarist Elliott Langford (left) and guitarist Dan Parkinson (right) in Scunthorpe, 2011. Langford left the band in 2012.

Kids Can't Fly initially planned to shoot a music video with a live audience on 11 February 2011, however they cancelled the shooting of the video because of the departure of Comley, Stanikk and Wilson. Comley and Wilson both decided to get jobs outside of the music industry. Ryan left the band for "personal and professional reasons". On 21 June 2011 Drew Comley had been announced as the new bassist for Octane OK. In an Interview in December 2011, Robin has said that their departures were related saying "He [Comley] was such an important person in the band, that other members didn't find the group dynamics comfortable any more, and so they also left."

On 11 November 2011 Kids Can't Fly released their third single Esmeralda and later on, in February 2012 Kids Can't Fly announced the release of a fourth single Stick To Your Guns and a new extended play Northern Horizons. They promoted the single by making it available to download for free on 11 February. The announcement of the new single and EP was coupled with a short tour of the United Kingdom with The First, spanning late February into Early March. Footage of the tour was used for the music video for Stick To Your Guns which was released on 21 May 2012.

The band performed at Southampton's Takedown and Middlesbrough's Make A Scene festivals. On 11 May 2012 Kids Can't Fly released Information about the line-up change in the band. With two of the band members: bassist Elliott Langford and drummer Ash Springle, who both only joined the band last year left due to personal choices and desires to pursue careers outside the music industry. While the original Kids Can't Fly drummer Scott Wilson, rejoined as well as two new members joining; Tom Dowd formerly of Nine Days Lane who had supported Kids Can't fly on tour as a bass guitarist and trumpeter Chris Booroff.

Kids Can't Fly's fourth ep Northern Horizons was released on 25 June 2012. The ep was originally titled Good Morning Gentlemen and was originally stated to be released in early 2012. The ep was recorded at the Monnow Valley Studio and was produced by Welsh rock producer Romesh Dodangoda. To promote the release of Northern Horizons the band did a UK tour in June 2012 leading up to the release with These City Lights as a constant support throughout the entire tour.

The band played their final shows in June and July 2014

== Musical style and influence ==
The band has often described themselves as being "basically a pop punk band with a horn section". The band is credited for their incorporation of ska and reggae influences into their music, their music has been considered pop-punk, incorporating "punk guitar riffs and a sax and trumpet accompaniment". Their ska punk influence is found in their use of brass instrumentation like saxophones, trombones and trumpets and their ska inspired horn lines and harmonies. Lyrically the band often features tongue-in-cheek lyrics, akin to many pop punk bands. Lyrical themes found through the music all relate to staying positive complicated relationships and "guy meets girl" scenarios. Kids Can't Fly utilises several vocalists in their music.

The band's primary influences shifted with their style, initially taking influence from Reel Big Fish and Less Than Jake, but then taking more prominent influence from Four Year Strong and Fall Out Boy. The band believes that the responsibility for the stylistic change from straight up ska punk was due to the continuous membership change in their early development. The band has stated that if they ever had a chance to tour with bigger bands it would be with either Fall Out Boy, Four Year Strong or Zebrahead. Fall Out Boy's influence on the band has been noted especially in both the fact that Robin Black's vocals resemble and are influenced by Patrick Stump's, while also being nicknamed by critics as "English Fall Out Boy" and a "Four Year Strong with horns". Black's signing style is considered distinct as his accent influences his singing.

== Members ==
Current Members

- Robin Black – lead vocals & guitar (2006–present)
- Tom Dowd – bass guitar & vocals (2012–present)
- Dan Parkinson – guitar (2011–present)
- Dave Matthews – saxophone (2006–present)
- Scott Wilson – drums (2006–2011; 2012–present)
- Chris Booroff – trumpet (2012–present)

Former Members

- Drew Comley – bass guitar & vocals (2006–2011)
- Ryan Stanikk – trombone (2006–2011)
- Jay Havelock – (2006–????)
- Dave Ramsey – trumpet (2006–2008)
- Ben Marion – saxophone (2006–2008)
- Ash – Drums (2011–2012)
- Elliott Langford – bass guitar & vocals (2011–2012)
- Josh Roe – Trumpet (2009)
- Geraint 'Mitzy' Owen – saxophone (2006)

== Discography ==
Extended Plays

- The Take Off EP (Self-released, 2006)
- No Joy for the Jealous (Self-released, 2007)
- Strength in Numbers (Self-released, 2010)
- Northern Horizons (Self-released, 2012)

Albums

- Untitled (2013)

Singles

- Everyone (2010)
- She Called Shotgun / Heartstrong (2010)
- Esmeralda (2011)
- Stick To Your Guns (2012)

Compilations

- Lazy Bear's Definitive Guide to Pop-Punk 2011 (Lazy Bear Records, 2011), contributed Esmeralda.
