= Lucia Foster Welch =

English politician (1864–1940)

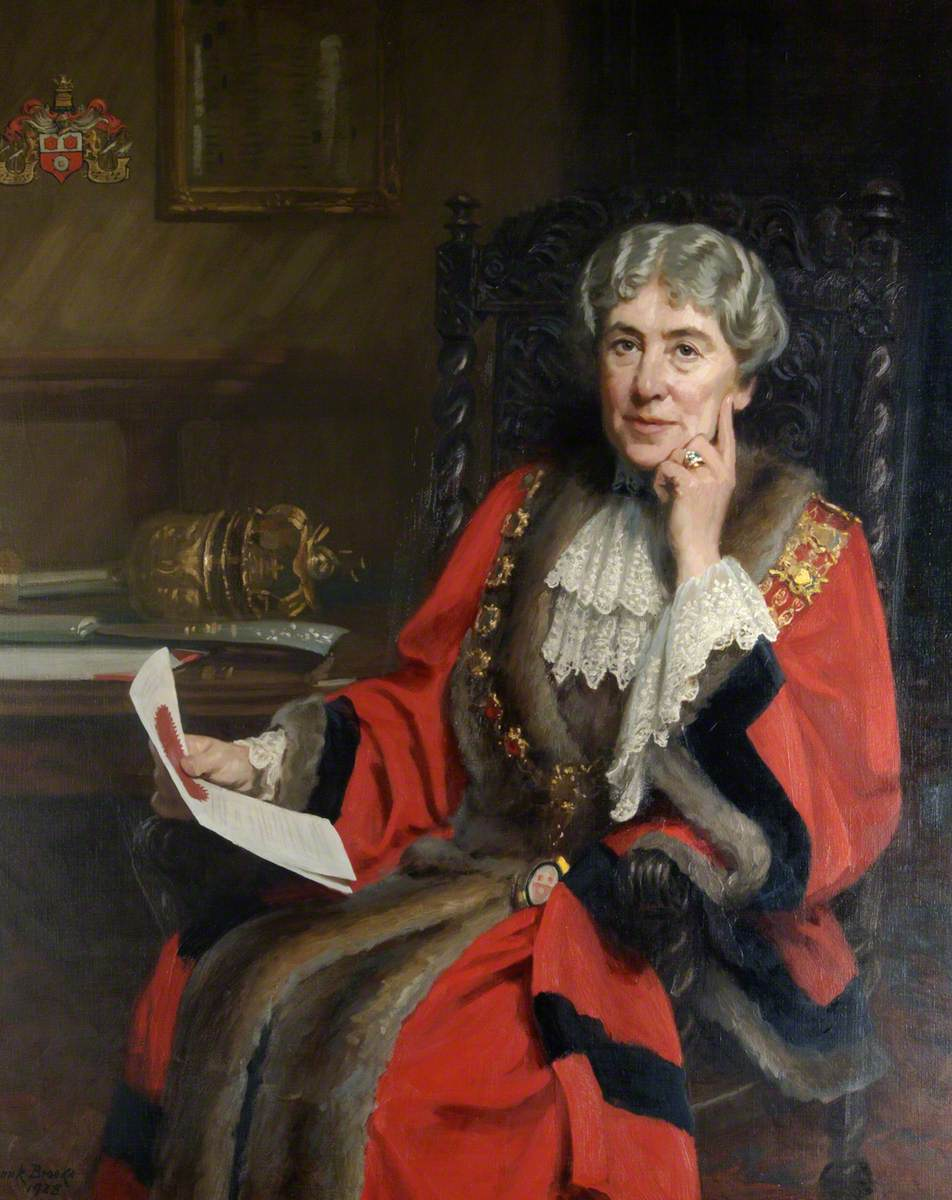
Welch in 1928, by Frank Brooks

Lucia Marion Foster Welch (1864–1940) was a suffragette and conservative politician who served as Southampton's first female mayor.

Lucia Foster Welch was born Lucia Marion Brown in Liverpool in 1864. Her mother was a close friend of Elizabeth Fry. In 1884 she married Philip Braham. She moved to Southampton in 1903 before marrying Robert William Foster Welch (a doctor) a year later.

Lucia Foster Welch was actively involved in the suffragette movement and was a member of the National Union of Women's Suffrage Societies and the Women’s Social and Political Union. On 4 February 1911 when Emmeline Pankhurst gave a speech in Southampton at the Palace Theatre, Lucia Foster Welch hosted Pankhurst and a number of friends and sympathisers for tea after the event. In 1912 when the National Union of Women’s Suffrage Societies was concerned that the National League for Opposing Woman Suffrage was going to concentrate its activities on Southampton that winter, Lucia Foster Welch was made head of a committee formed to oppose them. However little anti-suffrage activity appears to have taken place in Southampton during the relevant period.

In 1918 with elections suspended due to the war Lucia Foster Welch was co-opted to the town council as the then town's first female Councillor. Later that year when elections were held she defended her seat representing Newtown. In 1927 she was elected as the town's first female Mayor. At the time it was a regular part of the mayor's duties to greet more distinguished travelers at the docks. In this role Lucia Foster Welch greeted Henry Ford. She also greeted Amelia Earhart after she did her transatlantic flight.
