= On My Honor (band) =

- Origin: Knoxville, Tennessee, United States
- Genres: Pop punk
- Years active: 2007-2014
- Members: Drew Justice; Lucas Sams; Jordan Garner; Jake Jones; Tobias Campbell

On My Honor was an American pop punk band from Knoxville, Tennessee.

== History ==
The band formed in the year 2007. They released multiple EPs before releasing their debut album titled I Never Deserve The Things I Need in 2013. The band announced in 2014 that they would be going on tour during the month of July with The Sheds and Smalls. The band split on 14 August 2014 stating that "it's time for On My Honor to come to an end".

== Band members ==
- Drew Justice (Vocals)
- Lucas Sams (Guitar)
- Jordan Garner (Guitar & Vocals)
- Jake Jones (Bass)
- Tobias Campbell (Drums)
