= Townhill Park =

Suburb of Southampton, England

Coordinates: 50.9308°N 1.3579°W

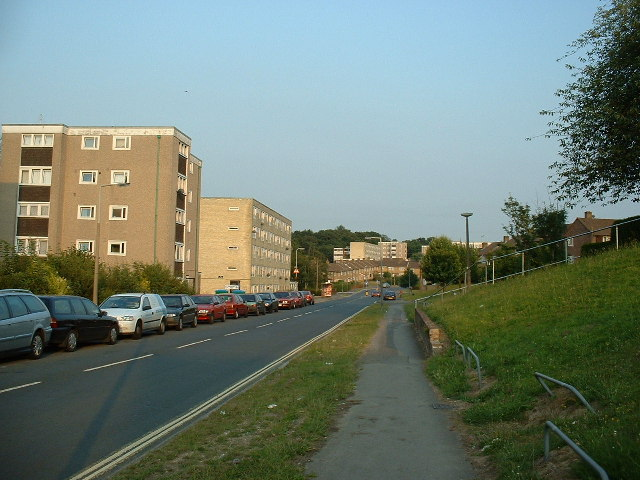
- Meggeson Avenue is the main road through the Townhill Park housing estate

- Location within Southampton
- Unitary authority: Southampton
- Ceremonial county: Hampshire
- Region: South East
- Country: England
- Sovereign state: United Kingdom
- Post town: SOUTHAMPTON
- Postcode district: SO18
- Dialling code: 023
- Police: Hampshire and Isle of Wight
- Fire: Hampshire and Isle of Wight
- Ambulance: South Central
- UK Parliament: Southampton Itchen

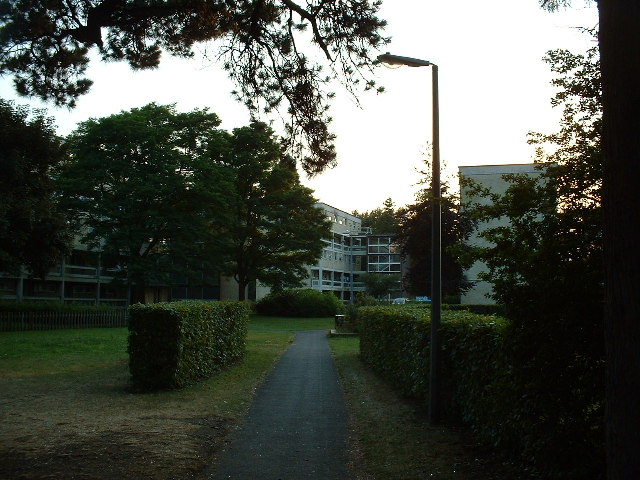
Townhill Park has blocks of flats of various designs

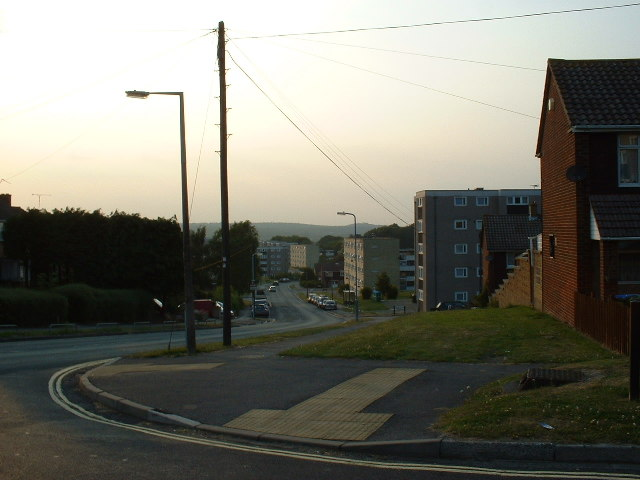

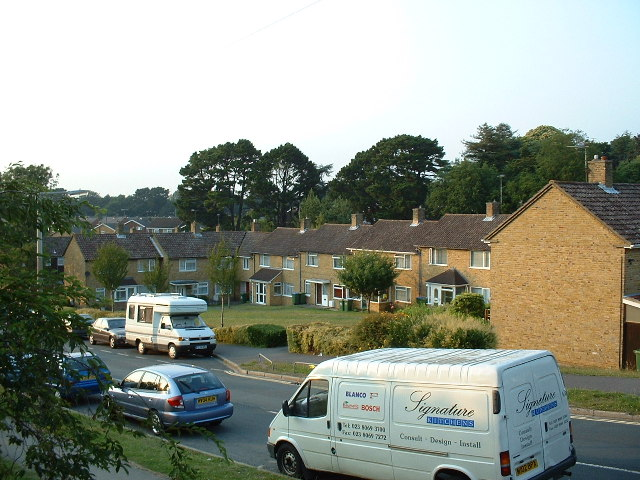

Townhill Park is a suburb of Southampton, England, bordering Swaythling, Bitterne Park and West End. It is built on land which once belonged to the house which carries the same name.

== History ==
The Manor of Townhill was granted to Sir William Paulet by Henry VIII in 1536 after the Dissolution of the Monasteries. The land was mainly used for farming, and became known as Townhill Farm.

Townhill Farm became part of the Manor of South Stoneham, but was purchased in 1787 by Nathaniel Middleton, who had made his fortune in the service of the British East India Company. He turned the farmhouse into a private home, and the estate became known as Townhill Park. He enlarged the farmhouse, but a fire resulted in a complete revamp of the property in 1793. The property later passed into the hands of the Gater family, who also owned the nearby Gaters Mill near Mansbridge.

In 1897, Townhill Farm was purchased by Samuel Montagu, 1st Baron Swaythling, for his son Louis (who became the second Baron Swaythling in 1911). In 1912, extensive further modifications were made to the building by architect Leonard Rome Guthrie. The gardens at Townhill Park were laid out by Gertrude Jekyll and were noted for their rhododendrons, azaleas and camellias. The Montagu Family lived in Townhill Park until the mid-1940s.

The property was sold in 1948. 294 acres (1.19 km^{2}) were sold to Southampton Borough Council for housing, and the suburb of Townhill Park came into existence. Meanwhile the house itself and the remaining 30 acres (120,000 m^{2}) of land became a school for underprivileged girls, owned and operated by Middlesex County Council.

The housing estate's show home was officially opened on 30 September 1959 by Benny Hill. where he was given a ceremonial key to the new house. Having arrived at Woodmill by Rolls-Royce, he switched to a horse-drawn milk float to make his entrance in Townhill Park.

The show house was a three-bedroom detached house, on the market for £3,100, making it one of the most expensive houses on the new estate. The cheapest available property was a single bedroom maisonette, listed at £1,995. The Daily Echo described the new houses as having "glass bricks, facing bricks and cement rendering blend with the tapering chimney breast to give a comfortable country look suited well to the surroundings."

The school in Townhill Park House closed in 1969 and the building was acquired by Southampton City Council. From 1971, the building was used as a hostel for Merchant Navy cadets, housing 75, until 1984 when the house became a conference centre.

In 1994, Townhill Park House was purchased by The Gregg School. The Friends of Townhill Park Gardens was established in 1997 to restore the gardens, which are now open to the public on four days each year. The house, too, is occasionally open for guided tours. The house is a grade II listed building.

The Ark pub operated on Meggeson Avenue from 1965 to 2013.

== Townhill Park today ==
The local authority boundary between Eastleigh (borough) and Southampton runs through the old Townhill Farm property, and the area is divided. The house and gardens, and the suburb of Chartwell Green in West End parish, lie within Eastleigh (borough) while the suburb of Townhill Park is governed by Southampton City Council.

The Townhill Park suburb consists mainly of blocks of flats, built originally as council housing. The hub of the area is Meggeson Avenue, where a small parade of shops and a small community centre are located. It also contains the Townhill Infant and Townhill Junior schools.

In 2024, a large amount of the block of flats in this area have been demolished part of the Townhill Park regeneration plans started in 2012.

== Culture and community ==
=== Community facilities ===
Townhill Park Community Centre was rebuilt in the early 21st century and is managed by the Townhill Park Community Association. The suburb is home to the seven hectare Frogs Copse.

== Law and order ==
Several street brawls involving gangs occurred in Townhill Park in 2009, one of which led to a 15-year-old boy receiving stab wounds to the neck. In the most significant brawl, nine arrests were made when the “Townhill Boys” and the “Thornhill Boys” clashed with axes, knives and pieces of wood, resulting in one of the 'Townhill Boys' being stabbed in the buttock. The violence peaked around the same time as knife related murders in London rose dramatically.

In 2012 a man was shot in the Vanguard Road area, but his injuries were not life-threatening.
