= Shamblehurst =

Shamblehurst, also known as Sandhust, was a manor and tithing within the ancient parish of South Stoneham, now in the modern-day Borough of Eastleigh. It had Allington tithing to the north and Botley and Durley parishes to the east.

Most of the village of West End, including the Union Workhouse, was situated in the Shamblehurst tithing with a small part of it falling within Allington. Shamblehurst contained three farms- Shamblehurst, Flanders and Botley Grange; two mills - Woodmill in modern-day Swaythling and the Stoneham Paper Mill in modern Mansbridge; and several country houses including Townhill Park and Thornhill Park.

== History ==
At the beginning of the thirteenth century Shamblehurst belonged to Henry Bisset, whose son John married Alice Bassett, daughter of Thomas Bassett. Henry gifted his new daughter-in-law the manor of Shamblehurst, and the manor and hundred of Bargate. John and Alice Bisset left three daughters as co-heiresses.

The eldest, Margaret, married Richard de Redvers while her sister Ela became wife to John de Wotton. Both had sons named John who inherited significant lands from their parents; John de Redvers, son to Richard and Margaret held the manor of Bargate with the park and hundred of Mansbridge while Ela's son took her family name to become John Bisset and held the manor of Rockbourne.

The Local Government Act 1894 saw Shamblehurst divided with parts of it joining with parts of neighbouring tithings to form new civil parishes, including West End with part of Allington.
