= South Stoneham House =

Former manor house and hall of residence in Southampton

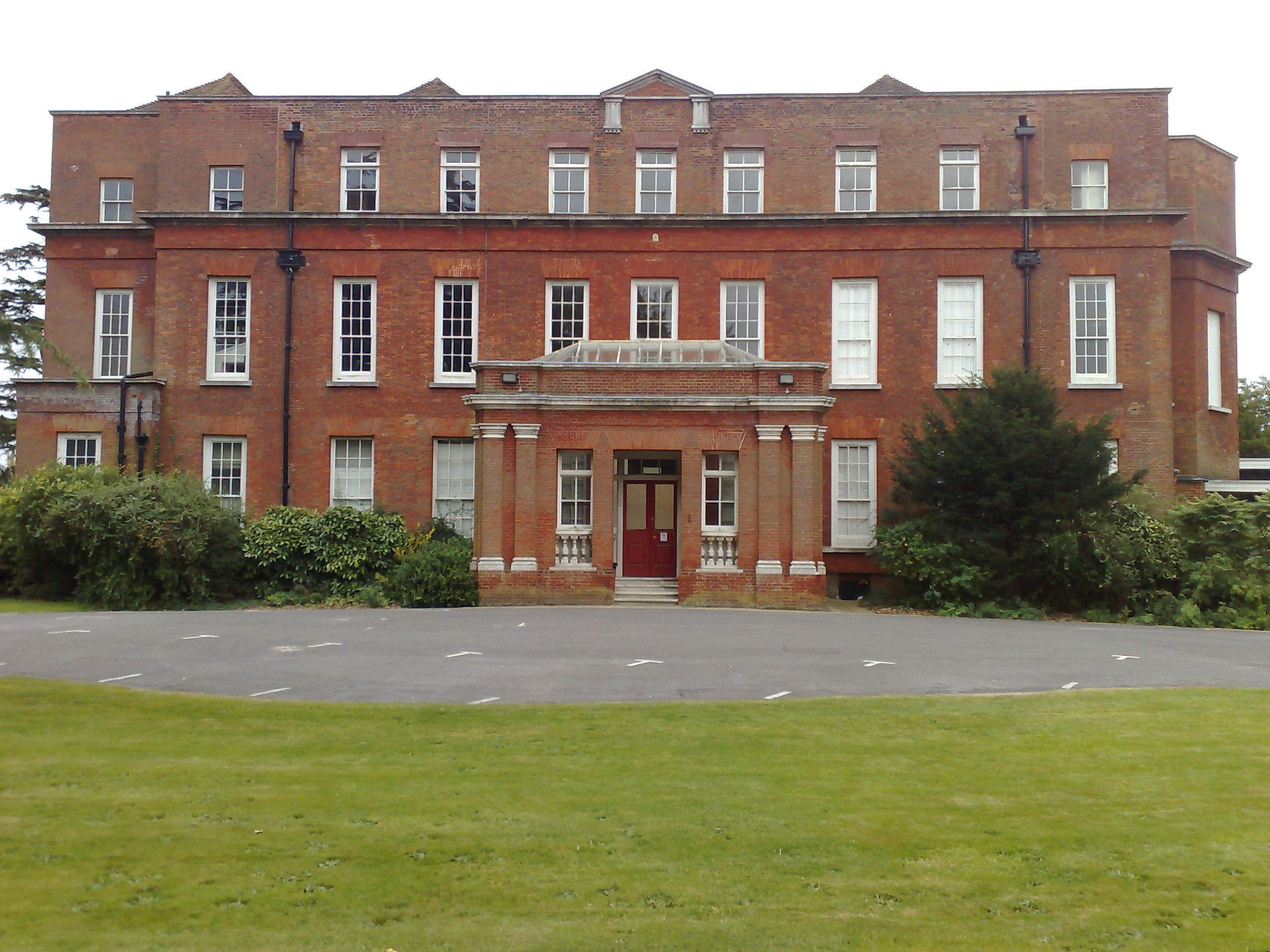
- The north (front) face of the original house

- Location within Southampton

General information
- Status: Completed
- Type: House
- Location: Wessex Lane, Swaythling, Southampton, England
- Coordinates: 50°56′12″N 1°22′37″W
- Completed: 1708, 1964
- Owner: University of Southampton

Height
- Height: (tower) 48.7 metres

Technical details
- Floor count: 3 (original); 17 (extension)
- Lifts/elevators: 2

Design and construction
- Architect: Nicholas Hawksmoor (original house)
- Architecture firm: Brandt, Potter, Hare Partnership (1964 extension)
- Structural engineer: EWH Gifford and Partners (1964 extension)
- Other designers: Lancelot "Capability" Brown
- Main contractor: Trollope and Colls Limited (1964 extension)
- Designations: Grade II* listed

South Stoneham House is a Grade II* listed former manor house in Swaythling, Southampton, England. It was the former seat of the Barons Swaythling before the family moved to the nearby Townhill Park House. The building is owned by the University of Southampton, and was used as a hall of residence, part of the Wessex Lane Halls complex. It has been derelict since 2005.

Originally known as Bishop's Stoneham, the records of the manor date from the 11th century, but the current house was constructed in the early 18th century. It has been attributed to Nicholas Hawksmoor with the gardens and landscaping attributed to Lancelot "Capability" Brown. The house is located close to the River Itchen and Monks Brook and the manor's previous owners include the Willis-Fleming family of nearby North Stoneham and Samuel Montagu, 1st Baron Swaythling.

After Montagu's death in 1911 his son elected to continue living at nearby Townhill Park House, and South Stoneham was sold in 1921 to University College Southampton (now the University of Southampton) for use as student accommodation. In 1964 the building was considerably altered by adding a 17-storey tower and a kitchen and dining complex to the building. The tower was deemed unsuitable for continued use and in 2004 the university submitted plans to demolish it with the intention of converting the original house into a conference venue and building new blocks of flats on the remaining landscaped gardens. The house and tower ceased to be used in 2005 and the house was boarded up in 2009. The university placed the property up for sale in 2015 but failed to find a buyer. The 2020 planning application for demolition of the tower included plans, agreed with Historic England, to build student accommodation and put the manor house back into active use. The tower was demolished in early 2022. The house remains boarded up, described as "a pathetic sight" in the new edition of Pevsner's The Buildings of England.

== History ==
=== Manor of South Stoneham (990–1708) ===
A charter dating from 990 relates to the manor of South Stoneham and during building works in the area immediately around the current house and grounds, archaeological evidence of a Saxon settlement was found. The manor of South Stoneham was originally called Bishop's Stoneham, and was held by the Bishop of Winchester at the time of the Domesday Book. The original parish of South Stoneham covered more than 8,000 acres (32.37 km^{2}; 12.50 sq mi), and extended along the eastern side of the River Itchen from the site of the present day Eastleigh in the north to just above Northam Bridge in the south, and from Swaythling to the outskirts of the original town of Southampton on the western side of the river; it included the tithings of Allington, Barton, Pollack, Shamblehurst, and Portswood. Other than St. Mary's Church (which is close to South Stoneham House but predates it considerably) and a few adjacent houses, there was no village of "South Stoneham"; the closest village to the house was Swaythling, now a suburb of Southampton.

The tenants of the manor apparently took their name from it; a Gregory de South Stoneham (or Gregory de Stoneham) is recorded there in 1236 and 1249, and in 1315 the manor was held by Nicholas de South Stoneham (son of Guy de South Stoneham). In 1348 Thomas de Stoneham and his wife Alice were lord and lady of the manor, and five heiresses of theirs – possibly daughters – held the manor in 1367. However, that year they quitclaimed it to Adam le Chaundle.

The history is somewhat incomplete after that point, but records do exist of the manor being passed from Nicholas Fitz John to William Nicholl in 1436 and from John Langhorn to Thomas Payne in 1478. After Payne's death the manor passed to John Langhorn's son William, and it remained in the Langhorn family until Stephen Langhorn, or Langher, sold it to John Capelyn for £140 in 1553.

Capelyn sold the manor to William Conway in 1600, who sold it to Edmund Clerke in 1612; Clerke's son inherited the manor in 1634 but only survived for a further two years, at which point the manor passed to Edmund Clerke's 8½-year-old grandson, another Edmund. This Edmund Clerke was the Sheriff of Hampshire and clerk to the Signet in 1671. Clerke the younger married the daughter of Giles Frampton, who took control of the manor after Clerke's death and sold it to Edmund Dummer, a former Surveyor of the Navy, in 1705.

=== South Stoneham House (1708–1920) ===
Dummer purchased the South Stoneham estate, comprising approximately 300 acres (120 ha), for the sum of £3,400. The house was constructed in 1708 as Dummer's family home, and its design has been attributed to Nicholas Hawksmoor; the listed building description published by Historic England states that Hawksmoor was "almost certainly" the architect. The actual construction was carried out by Dummer's uncle, Thomas Dummer of London. Edmond Dummer was from nearby North Stoneham and had been baptised in St. Nicolas' Church there. The grounds of the house comprised 110 acres, with 5 acres of water.

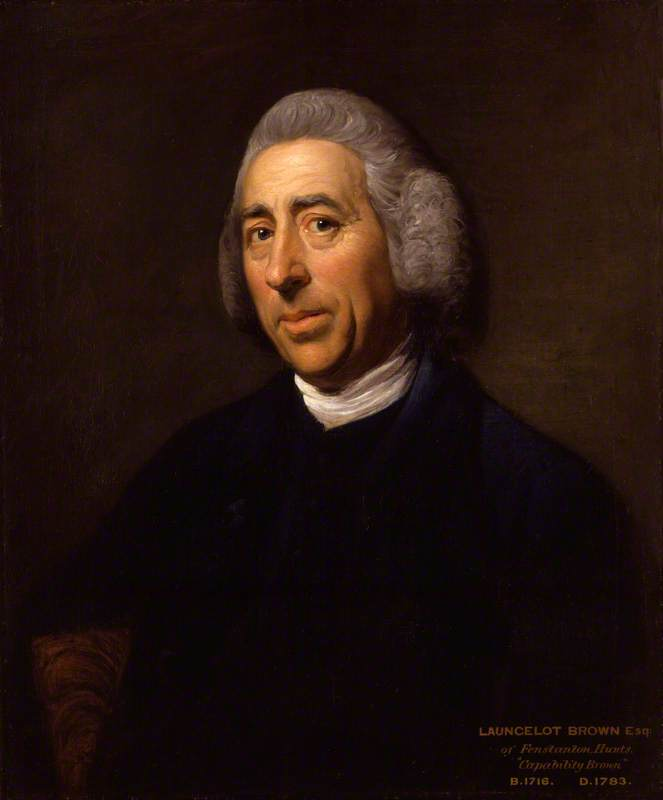
Portrait of Capability Brown by Nathaniel Dance-Holland, 1769

Edmund Dummer was declared bankrupt in 1711 and he died in debtors' prison two years later. His cousin Thomas, a lawyer who had acquired the manor on Edmund's behalf, fought a lawsuit attempting to gain control of the property; however in 1716, Edward Nicholas of Newton Valence took ownership of South Stoneham, purchasing it from Edmund Dummer's daughter, Jane. William Sloane, whose brother Hans founded the British Museum, purchased the manor from Nicholas in 1740, and it was subsequently owned by his son, another Hans Sloane who went on to become a member of Parliament. The previously formal grounds were landscaped between 1772 and 1780 by Capability Brown at a cost of £1,050. In 1797, Frances Elizabeth Eyre, later Countess Nelson of Trafalgar and of Merton as wife of Thomas Nelson, was born at the house. From 1804 to 1809 the estate was owned by Jean Louis Bazalgette. Bazalgette came from a French family of tailors and was born in Ispagnac, France in 1750. Around the age of 20 he began travelling north and within five years was in London as an established tailor. He was commissioned by George, the Prince Regent to travel back to France while the two countries were at war in order to obtain a particular material the prince desired for a waistcoat. John Lane purchased the estate from Bazalgette for £15,000 in 1809 or 1810, but was later declared bankrupt and the manor was put up for sale in 1815. It was not until 1819, however, that it was bought by John Willis Fleming, who also owned the manor of North Stoneham where a new house was being built for him at North Stoneham Park.

When the new North Stoneham House was completed, John Willis Fleming moved there and leased South Stoneham House to General Joseph Gubbins until the general's death in 1832. In 1831 there was a major fire at North Stoneham, and John Willis Fleming returned to live in South Stoneham House again after Gubbins' death while North Stoneham was rebuilt. When this was completed in 1834 South Stoneham House was again advertised to let, and in the latter part of the 1830s a Colonel Boucher was in residence. The house was advertised for let again in 1843 after which Mrs Charlotte Maria Beckford, who had lived at Chawton House and was acquainted with novelist Jane Austen from their mutual time in Chawton, leased South Stoneham House with her sister, Miss Lucy Middleton. Beckford died at South Stoneham House at the age of 86 on 25 June 1854, and Thomas Willis Fleming (second son of John) moved in. He purchased the property from his elder brother in 1857 and lived there until 1860/61. At this point they leased the property to W. C. Standish. The Willis Flemings put the house up for sale in 1875 and sold South Stoneham House for £20,000 in 1878, to Captain Thomas Davison (or Daveson). Included in the sale catalogue issued on 23 November 1875 was Wood Mill (still standing and operating as an outdoor activities centre as of 2013), Gascon Cottage, and land for building. "Gascon's Meadow with house thereon in South Stoneham" was reconveyanced the next year.

Samuel Montagu, 1st Baron Swaythling, was the last owner of South Stoneham House before it was sold to the University.

In 1888 South Stoneham House was purchased from Davison by Samuel Montagu, who became the first Baron Swaythling in 1907. During his tenure he had a large porch added to the front entrance of the house. Eleven years after buying South Stoneham House he also purchased Townhill Park House for his son Louis, who continued to live at Townhill after Samuel's death in 1911.

=== Hall of residence (1920–2005) ===
South Stoneham House was acquired, with South Hill (some two miles to the northwest), in 1920 to house male students at University College Southampton. The salmon pool at South Stoneham was retained by the Montagu family, becoming part of the Townhill Park estate. Tradition prevailed in the house, with a collegiate atmosphere as gowns were expected to be worn to dinner and lectures and curfews were enforced.

A bell was rung at 5.45 each evening and everyone settled in silence to study until another bell two hours later released us for dinner. At 10 o'clock another bell called us to prayers. Half an hour later the warden came round to all the bedrooms to check that everyone was in bed.

— Ernest Holmes, The University of Southampton, An Illustrated History

By 1924, there was distinct pressure on space in the halls of residence, and it was clear that more rooms were needed. The existing halls were full and so South Stoneham and South Hill were extended by covering their outbuildings.

During the Second World War, the Highfield location of the college meant it was directly in the war zone itself. With Southampton being attacked, the halls of residence were also at risk: at South Stoneham windows were blown in by bombs. The School of Navigation at the college was relocated to the communal rooms of South Stoneham House for the duration of the war, and afterwards was moved to Warsash; in 1970 the school became independent of the university (instead it is affiliated to Southampton Solent University) and is known as the Warsash Maritime Academy.

When the college obtained its royal charter in 1952, South Stoneham House was used to house around 70 male students out of a student population of over 800. Chemist Alan Carrington was one of the students housed in South Stoneham in that first year as the University of Southampton, and Carrington went on to become a professor of chemistry at the university.

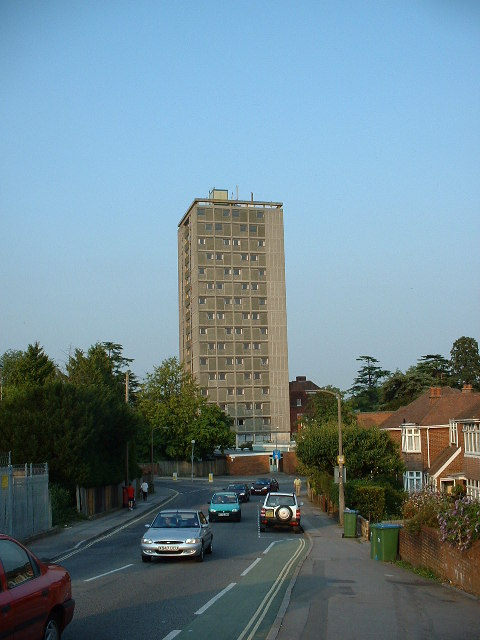
The 17-storey extension to South Stoneham House from the west in 2005, the last year it was fully occupied

The stables and servants' quarters were demolished in 1961 and in 1964 a concrete tower extension was added to the hall, incorporating a bar and dining hall area. The tower contained 180 student rooms over its 17 floors and was 48.7 metres high, making it the 10th-tallest building in Southampton in December 2017. Despite some later claims to the contrary, there is no contemporary evidence that these extensions were intended to be temporary.

On 9 January 1986, Southampton City Council created the Itchen Valley Conservation Area which includes South Stoneham House and Lodge. This places a number of restrictions on the construction of new buildings and the demolition of existing structures; however the council made an exception in the case of the tower block attached to South Stoneham House, which "may be considered for demolition by the University within the plan period."

In 1997 the university undertook extensive repairs to the roof of the house. The entrance hall was redecorated, the capitals to the pillars and pilasters being re-gilded. It is not clear whether any other rooms were renovated at this time.

In the 1990s South Stoneham House was merged into the Wessex Lane Halls complex of residences, although each individual hall maintained an individual character. Residents were catered for and ate originally in South Stoneham's own dining hall, part of the 1960s extension, and later in the Galley Restaurant in the neighbouring Connaught Hall. Residents shared small kitchen and bathroom facilities.

=== Dereliction, restoration and redevelopment proposals from 2005 ===
Much controversy surrounded the continued use of South Stoneham Tower and in 1997 a large wooden collar was added to the base of the tower to prevent crumbling concrete falling onto staff and students below. In 2002 the accommodation in the tower was criticised - partly due to overcrowding, but also regarding the state of the building itself, with inhabitants living in what the Daily Telegraph described as "damp and squalid conditions".

The tower's construction and its extensive use of asbestos meant there would be problems in its decommission and demolition. Physical disassembly would be hugely expensive, while explosives could not be used due to the proximity of private houses and the Grade II* listed original building. Indeed, because the tower and kitchen/dining hall complex were physically linked to the original house by a glazed connection, the whole site, including the tower, shared the listed building status.

In 2004 the university commissioned a firm of architects to create a listed building consent application to enable the tower and the kitchen and dining hall complex to be demolished. The application stated that the demolition was part of a "master plan" which "seeks to establish the reinstatement of South Stoneham House to a standard befitting its Listed Building status. The key part of the master plan is to refurbish and change the use of the Listed Building [to enable it to function] as a conference facility." There would be extensive internal restoration which would see the house's eighteenth century rooms renovated with original period features. The application stated that this would replace the university's conference centre at Chilworth Manor.

To pay for the demolition of the 1960s extension, the consent application indicated that the university planned to sell off another part of the current South Stoneham estate, currently occupied by a tennis court and caretakers' house, for a residential scheme comprising 65 flats. In addition, to replace the student accommodation that the demolition would remove, the plan was for another building containing 64 student flats plus staff accommodation to be constructed on the eastern part of the site. The plan also indicated the provision of better access to the site including new footpaths alongside Monks Brook and the River Itchen as well as the possibility of handing part of the site to the city council as a nature conservation area.

The listed building consent application for the demolition was recommended for approval although concerns were raised regarding the proposed new constructions, which were to be detailed in a separate application. Other applications made at the time, for the demolition of other buildings on the site and for the refurbishment and change of use of the house itself were also recommended for approval.

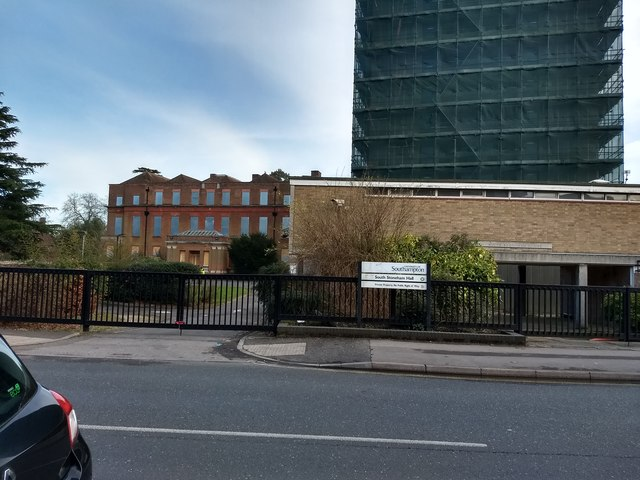
The house, boarded up and derelict, in 2018

A 2007 promotional leaflet revealed that architecture firm Poole Philips had recently completed a design for the "restoration and enhancement" of South Stoneham House to be used as a conference centre. The design combined the historical original house with "a modern glass structure".

These plans were not progressed and in 2009 the house was boarded up. In June 2011 an Archaeological Survey was carried out on behalf of the University for a Historic Building Record. It found damp and substantial dry rot infestation in part of the house. To remedy this several of the original timber lintels, wooden wall panelling, plasterwork and some steps from the staircase had all been removed and it was planned to remove the entire staircase from the house. The lintels were to be replaced with new wood and the walls were to be replastered. Other works needed were repairs to external windows, exterior brickwork and pointing.

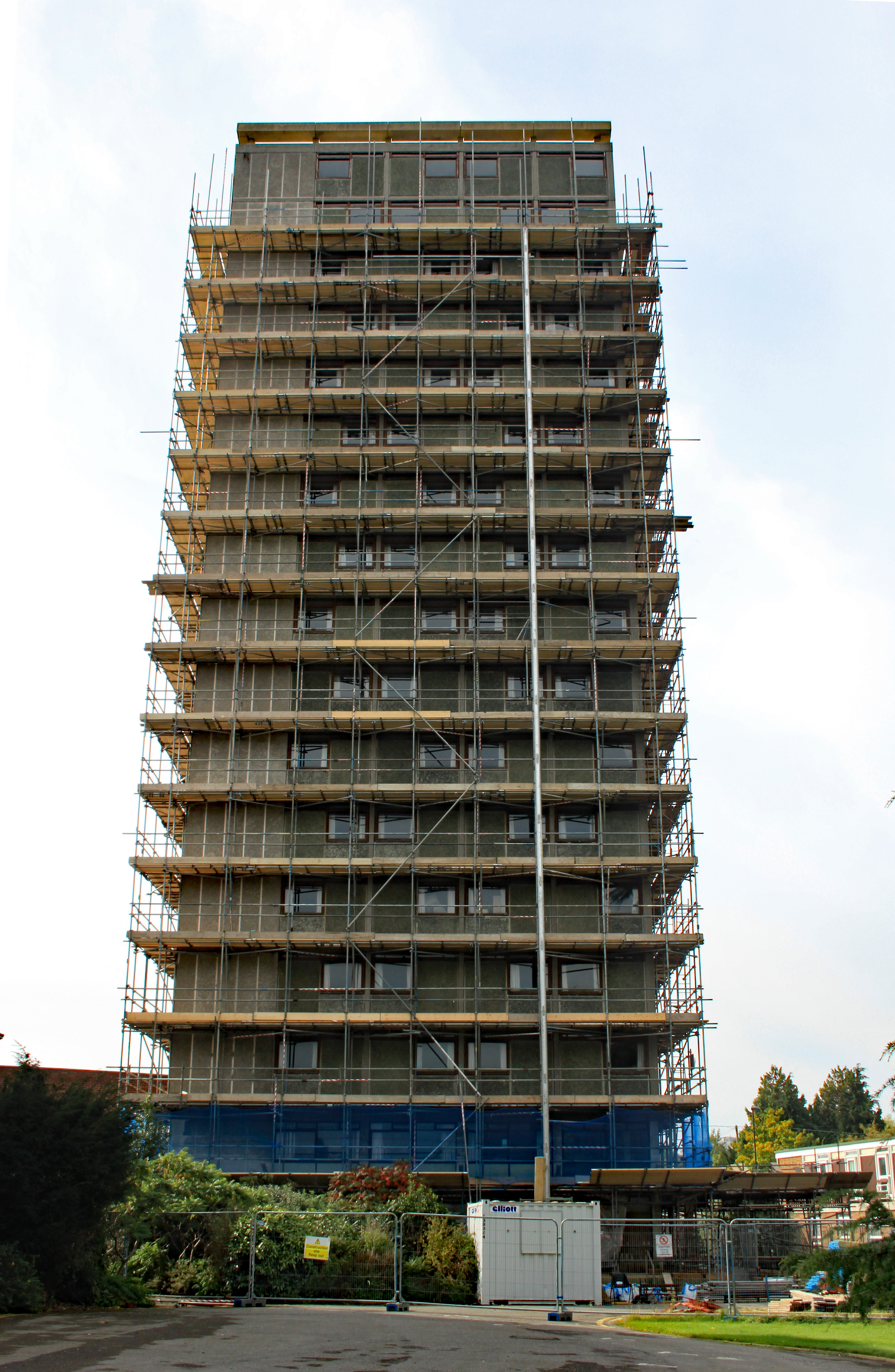
The tower, with scaffolding being erected around it in October 2012

The tower was shrouded in scaffolding in the autumn of 2012, with over 120 tonnes of materials being used to cover the structure.

In July 2013 the university requested Nicholas Hare Architects to assess the site's suitability for a student housing development, resulting in proposals to build accommodation incorporating 393 en-suite student bed spaces. Planning consultants Luken Beck conducted a planning appraisal in 2015.

The University put the site up for sale on a long leasehold basis in 2015, with the sales literature describing the property as a "large, underdeveloped site extending to 6.37 acres (2.58 hectares) in a highly attractive landscaped setting" and featuring an image depicting new blocks of student accommodation in place of the tower and on the opposite side of the original house. The literature indicated the site was "allocated for student accommodation use within the UDP with potential for 393 ensuite, purpose built bed spaces" and made no mention of the previous conference centre plans.

South Stoneham House was added to Save Britain's Heritage's Buildings At Risk register in June 2017.

In January 2019 the university announced a competition for architects to transform the site to provide accommodation, study spaces and communal social areas for 400 resident students with an aim to complete the project by 2022. Estimated fees for the project were set at £4 million. The competition also invited architects to bid for work on the main Highfield Campus as part of the institution's 10-year estates development programme. Entries for the competition closed in February 2019 and it was reported in April that year that the university had appointed five architects to a £3m framework to support the programme, having received eight bids.

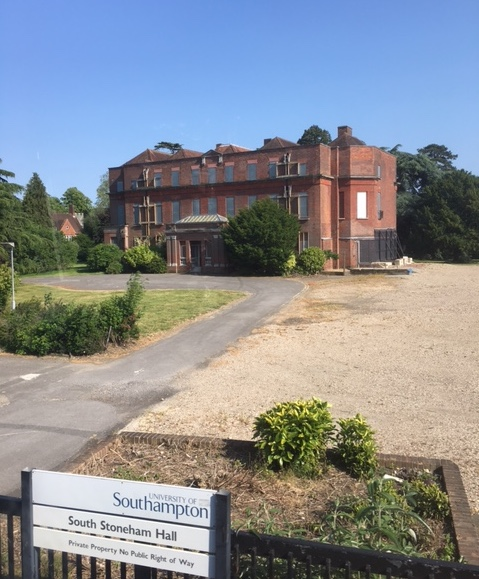
The House still boarded up, June 2023

In November 2020 the university submitted a planning application for the demolition of the tower and the 1960s extension, and permission was granted in March 2021. Key principles agreed with Historic England included putting the Manor House back into active use. The covering letter for the planning application stated that architecture firm Allies and Morrison had been commissioned by the University "to develop a Masterplan strategy for the Wessex Lane Student Village... with South Stoneham Manor House at its heart." The university appointed Keltbray to carry out the demolition and announced that this was due to start in January 2022 with the expectation that it would be completed by the middle of the year. The tower and extension were demolished in 2022 and as of 2024 the house remained boarded up and was displaying signs of water damage.

March 2026 saw the university consulting on new proposals for the site, now including the neighbouring Connaught Hall of Residence. The plans were to demolish the existing Connaught buildings and replace them with new buildings, along with further buildings flanking South Stoneham House. The house itself would be refurbished and transformed into 16 studio apartments, with the new buildings providing over 800 student rooms. The development would include new public spaces, including one called "Stoneham Square", and a community hub.

== Architecture ==
=== Original house ===
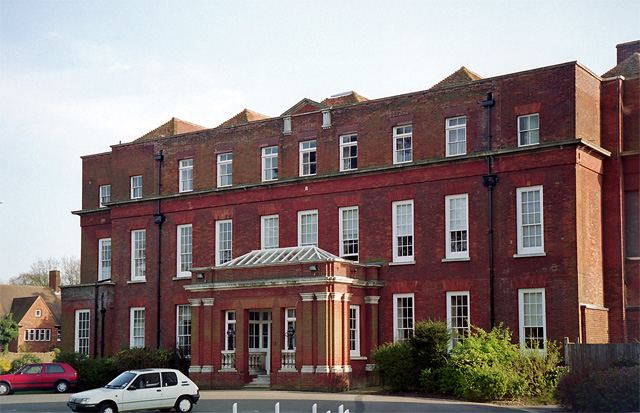
The north face of the house

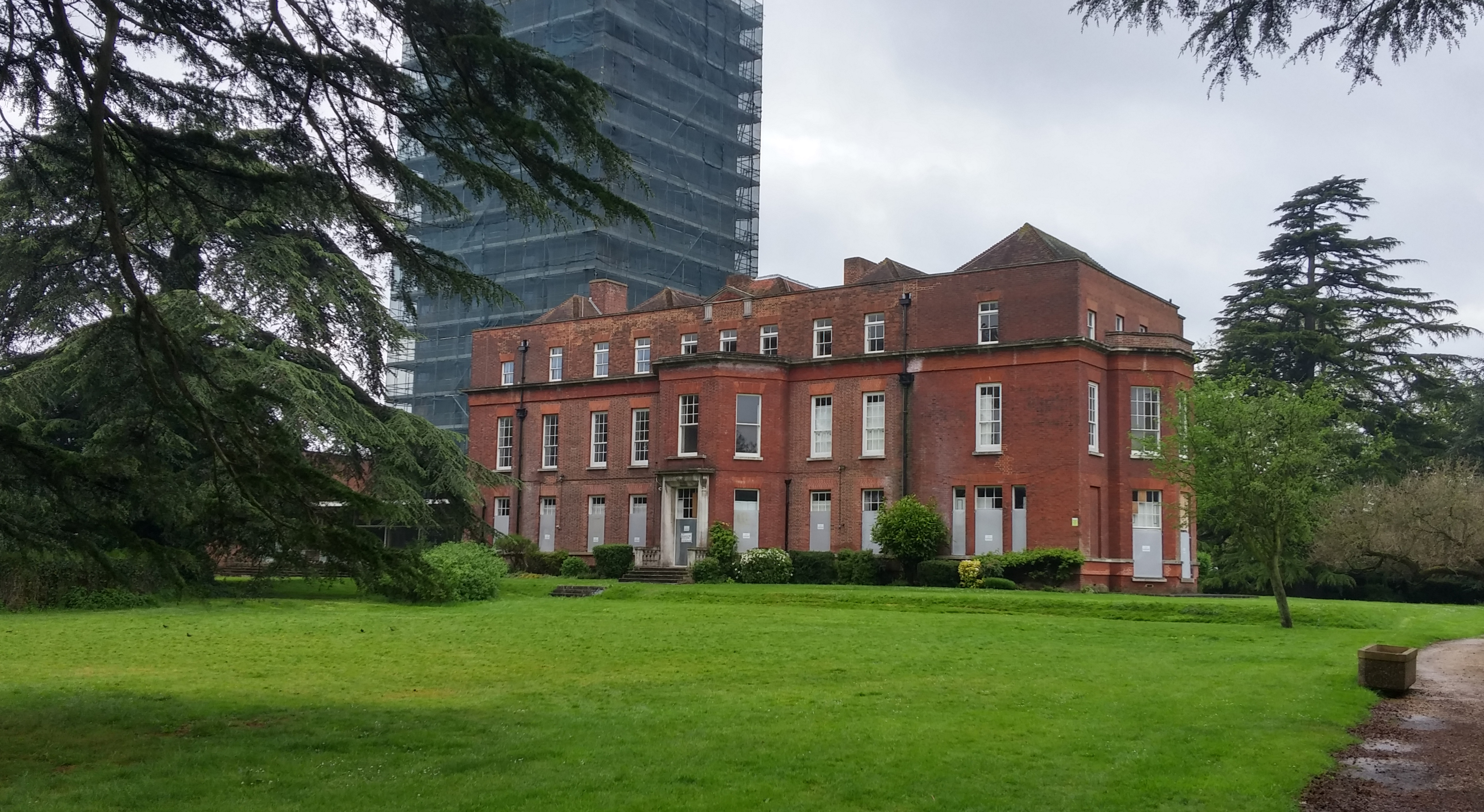
South face (rear) of the house

The architecture of the original building is attributed to Nicholas Hawksmoor, with some alterations from around 1900 and the subsequent modern 1960s extensions. The original mansion is in the Queen Anne style. The house itself has three storeys constructed of red brick. The ground floor level has a rubbed brick band at nine courses, and another rubbed brick band exists on the second floor, along with a moulded stone cornice level with the sills.

The attic is tall and embraces the second floor. It has moulded stone coping and a small pediment in the centre, which is supported by a decorated entablature.

The roof is tiled and hipped, with five hips in all. The seven window openings built into the roof at second-floor level are original, but fitted with modern windows. On the first floor there are nine tall, narrow windows with wide frames, stone sills and deep arches of rubbed brick. In the late 18th century, eight windows were altered, two of which are on the left-hand-side of the door. The door itself is placed centrally with a coved, moulded architrave above. It is glazed and a Doric porch of modern brick covers the doorcase.

A full-height extension exists to the left-hand side of the building (looking at the north front), and the attic storey was extended by one bay on each side after this full-height extension was built. The building is now flanked by two modern wings.

The rear of the house, the south front, has the same overall design as the north front with the exception of a large central bay at ground and first-floor level. The first floor of the bay has three windows; the ground floor has two windows with a glazed door in the middle. This door is of similar design to the front door at the north of the house, and has four steps of Portland stone accompanied by balustrades also of Portland stone.

On both the north and south faces of the building there are two rainwater heads made of cast lead, inscribed with the initials "EDS".

=== 1960s extension ===
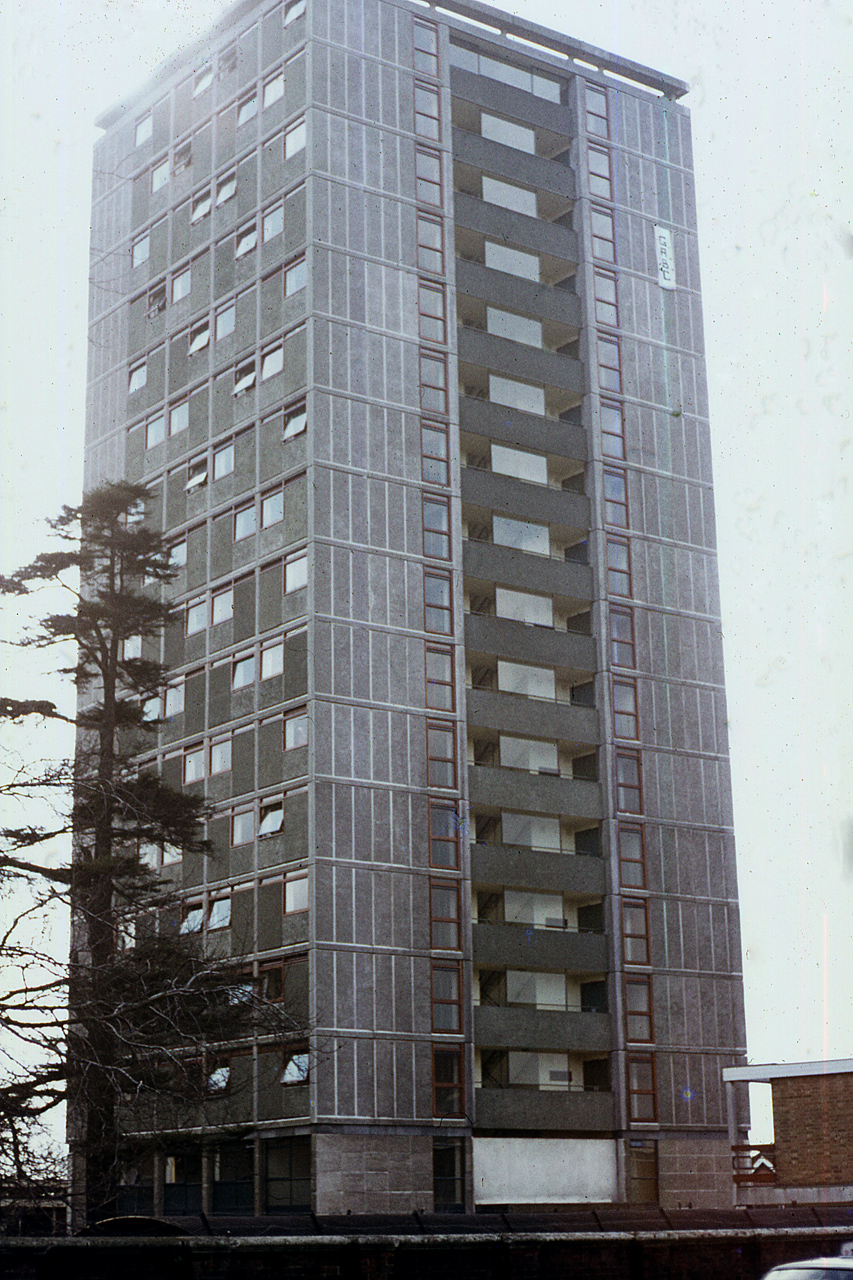
The tower in 1973, with one of Capability Brown's signature Cedar of Lebanon trees

The extension was designed by Robert Potter and Richard Hare, while the associate architect in charge was JJA Caount. Potter was based in Salisbury and was better known as an ecclesiastical architect, having previously designed the (now listed) Church of the Ascension in Crownhill, Plymouth and St George's Church in Oakdale, Dorset. During his lifetime he was also responsible for significant work on Chichester Cathedral, Chelmsford Cathedral, Oxford's Bodleian Library and he held the post of Surveyor to the Fabric of St Paul's Cathedral in London.

EWH Gifford and Partners were the structural engineers, while the general contractors were a company called Trollope and Colls Limited. The designers settled on a tower block so as to leave as much of the gardens and grounds intact as they could.

The tower block and other additions to the house were described in the January–March 1964 edition of Concrete Quarterly as "some very fine extensions":

The low blocks are of traditional brick construction to serve as a 'continuation' of the mansion. The tower, on the other hand, is concrete built and finished – a strikingly simple design of cross walls and facing panels which, in structural and elevational treatment, strongly suggests an industrialized building system: so much so, in fact, that it serves as a pointer to what system building can mean in terms of good architecture.

The tower block measured 49 by 56 feet (15 by 17 m) and rested on a concrete raft 2 feet 6 inches (76 cm) thick on a stiff clay subsoil. A reinforced concrete core kept the tower stable and contained the lifts and other services. This central core also supported a tower crane during construction which meant no scaffolding was used at all. Above the first floor level, the tower had an "egg crate structure" with cross walls made of reinforced concrete and measuring 6 inches (15 cm) thick, and 5 inches (13 cm) thick reinforced concrete floor slabs. Both the walls and floor slabs were cast on site.

== Grounds and gardens ==
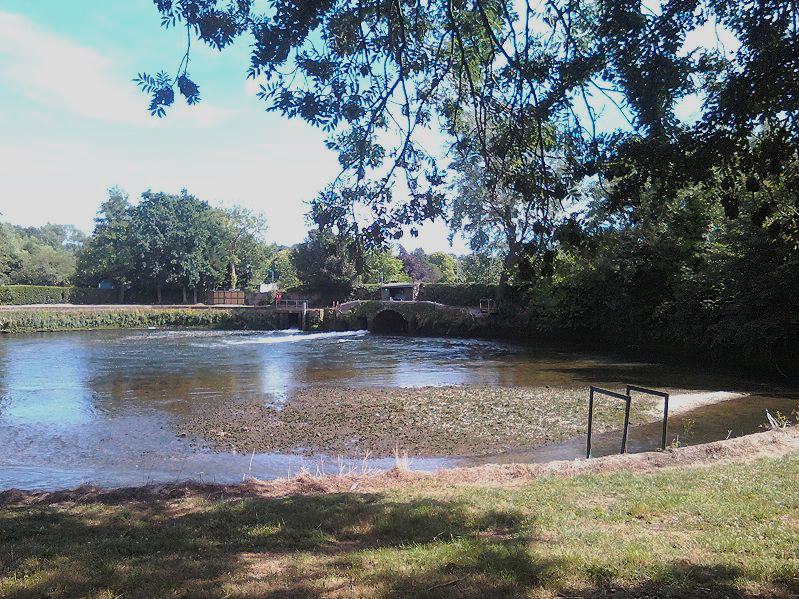
The salmon pool as seen from the grounds

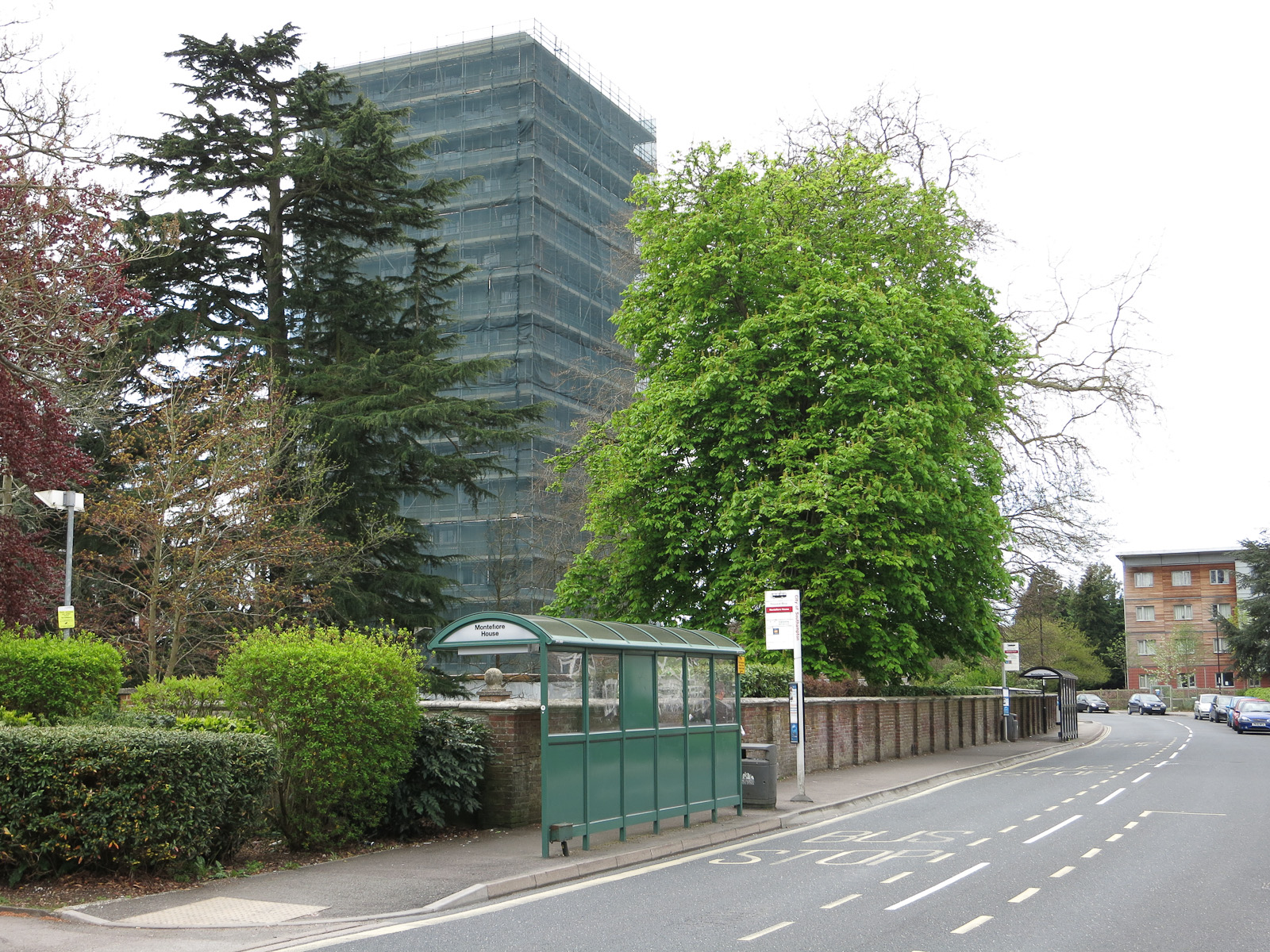
Mature trees in the front gardens in 2013

The estate was landscaped some time after 1722 by Lancelot "Capability" Brown and Kelly's Directory of 1915 described the house as being "pleasantly seated". At that time the grounds comprised 110 acres, with 5 acres of water, which would have included parts of Monks Brook (including the salmon pool that it flows into) and the River Itchen and the modern Riverside Park. However 100 years earlier the estate was more extensive, being described thus in The Times on 21 June 1815:

A highly valuable and very compact FREEHOLD ESTATE, comprising the manor or reputed manor of South Stoneham, and the capital Mansion, called South Stoneham-house, most delightfully situate on the banks of the Itchen river, distant only two miles and a half from Southampton, with offices of every description for a family of respectability, gardens, pleasure grounds, hot houses, ice house, sheets of water, fish ponds, and 360 customary acres of arable, meadow, and wood land, about 40 acres of which form a beautiful paddock, in which the mansion stands; the remainder divided into a farm, with farm house and buildings ...

In 1839 the estate was described as not particularly extensive, but notable for its groups of "patrician" elm trees. Architect Leonard Rome Guthrie redesigned part of the gardens at South Stoneham House in 1906 prior to moving on to contribute to the design of those at Townhill Park House.

It has been suggested that the ponds are relics of the "2 fisheries" mentioned in the Domesday Book entry for the site. The gardens and salmon pool were the subject of an oil painting by the neo-classical painter Adam Buck; the painting, measuring 35 inches by 57 inches, sold at auction at Sotheby's in London for £3,200 on 27 November 1974. Some of Capability Brown's signature cedars of Lebanon still surround the house today.

== Interior ==
=== Original house ===
When the house was sold in 1875, the interior was described thus:

A Corridor with scagliola pilaster, having solid Ormolu Corinthian caps and bases, leads to a spacious SEMI-OCTAGONAL LIBRARY, surrounded by twenty fluted three-quarter column scagliola pilasters, standing on a scagliola base, and having ormolu caps and bases supporting a richly moulded imitation marble cornice, the recesses filled with Shelves for Books, and a black marble chimney-piece and register stove. Plate glass French Windows open into a HANDSOME-CONSERVATORY 40-ft. long and 14-ft. 6-in. wide, with a silvered plate glass screen at the further end, giving an appearance of greater length, and stocked, with some choice creapers. On the right of the Hall is a Gentleman's Room or Study with Wainscotted Walls, two large Cupboards, marble and carved Mantel-piece, next to which is a GLASS and CHINA STORE ROOM, fitted with numerous Cupboards and a close Stove, and at the back a SCHOOL ROOM overlooking the Lawn, with marble Chimney Piece and register Stove. ANTE-ROOM at side, LOBBY, long Passage, W.C.; GARDEN ROOM at end, opening on to the Terrace. THE PRINCIPAL STAIRCASE with spiral balusters and Gallery Landing, leads to TWO NOBLE DRAWING ROOMS, divided by folding doors, one being 20-ft. 3-in., by 18-ft .. 6-in., and the other 25-ft. by 20-ft. 6-in., with moulded cornices, distempered walls, woodwork grained maple, enamelled slate chimney-piece in imitation of Sienna marble, and polished register Stove. A BED ROOM, 18-ft. by 16-ft., adjoining, and a DRESSING ROOM, also A PRINCIPAL OCTAGONAL SHAPED BED ROOM OVER THE LIBRARY.

When last recorded the Entrance Hall was entered through a screen of two fluted pillars and pilasters with Corinthian capitals which supported a beam with detailed plasterwork. The staircase curved out from the hall on the right and rose, cantilevered, up the back wall and then up the left hand wall. It turned left on to a narrow landing above the pillars and left again on to an open landing above the right hand wall of the Hall. Each tread had three barley twist banisters, the carved tread ends were decorated with scroll, flower and leaf designs, and there was a moulded hand rail. The ceiling of the hall was painted in what Pevsner calls 'a classical design with Adamish or Spanish qualities' with pelicans, trumpets and swags. It was supported by a dentil cornice. The ceiling appeared to be in a good condition in the mid-1980s. The Hall was painted and renovated in 1997. It is not clear whether this was the staircase it was planned to remove entirely in 2011.

There is little current information about the rest of the House. Much of the interior of the House is said to be panelled to dado level. There is supposed to be a music room at the eastern end of the ground floor with a cornice decorated with swags and paterae and a marble fireplace decorated with cupids, urns and more swags.

=== 1960s extension ===
Each of the upper floors of the tower block had a kitchen, a laundry and wash rooms as well as ten "study-bedrooms" and two larger rooms linked by a lobby. Each study room had a wash basin and fitted wardrobe. Originally the interior walls of the extension were not plastered since a plastic-faced plywood framework had been used to give a higher quality finish to the concrete, rendering plastering unnecessary. As a result, internal decoration was applied directly to the concrete walls.
