= Shamblehurst Farmhouse =

Farmhouse in Hedge End, Hampshire, England

Coordinates: 50°55′49″N 1°17′45″W

Shamblehurst Farmhouse is a Grade II listed building in Hedge End, Hampshire. Situated on Shamblehurst Lane, it was first listed on 14 February 1983.

The structure has two storeys and parts of it date from the 17th century, with alterations made in the 19th century. The building is timber-framed and, in common with many medieval structures, is jettied, meaning the first floor projects beyond the walls of the ground floor. The brickwork on the ground floor is painted, with Jacobean style hoods on the windows dating from the 19th century. The roof is tiled with red tiles in a banded pattern with hips. There are two large chimney stacks with square bases; one with two flues and the other with four, all diagonal to the front face of the house. The windows are leaded in a diamond-lozenge pattern.

Shamblehurst Farm is one of three that were listed within the tithing of Shamblehurst in the 19th century, the others being Flanders and Botley Grange.

The farmhouse currently carries the name "Strawberry Cottage".
