= Allington, Hampshire =

Coordinates: 50.95°N 1.32°W

Allington
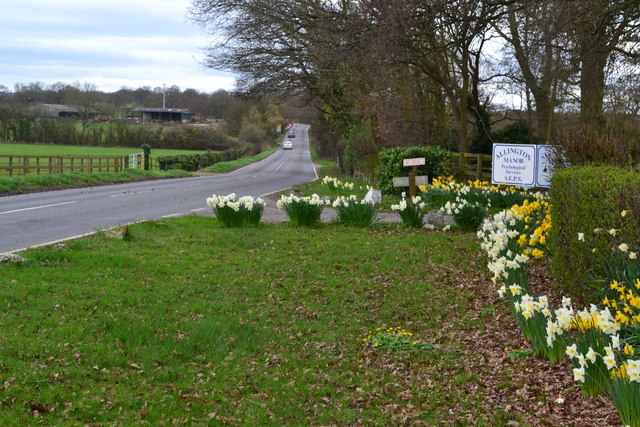
- The entrance to Allington Manor on Allington Lane

- Location within Hampshire
- OS grid reference: SU 479 172
- Civil parish: West End
- District: Borough of Eastleigh
- Shire county: Hampshire
- Region: South East
- Country: England
- Sovereign state: United Kingdom
- Post town: southampton
- Postcode district: SO50
- Dialling code: 023
- Police: Hampshire and Isle of Wight
- Fire: Hampshire and Isle of Wight
- Ambulance: South Central
- UK Parliament: Eastleigh

Allington is a small settlement in the Borough of Eastleigh, Hampshire, England, located at the northern extremity of the civil parish of West End.

== History ==
Allington was recorded as Ellatune in the eleventh century and in the thirteenth as Aldington. It is recorded in the Domesday Survey as Alditona, being held by William Alis and containing two mills and a church. With 27 households it was one of the largest 40% of settlements recorded in the Domesday Book. The land was granted to Alis in 1204 by Godfrey de Lucy, the Bishop of Winchester, with pannage rights given to the Priory of St Denys, which had just been founded. William Alis' descendants continued to hold the land, with Roger Alis recorded as the owner in 1223, and his son Thomas receiving the rents from the manor with his father's consent. Another William Alis possessed the estate until he died in 1304 without male issue, leaving the property to his two daughters with his widow retaining a life interest.

The daughters were Isabella, who was married to Robert le Helyon, and Margaret, who had married William le Rolleston. They each inherited a portion of the manor, the history of which diverges at this stage.

Two years after Margaret inherited her moiety, it passed to Richard Woodlock. Woodlock died in 1318 with his son William inheriting the moiety; his wife Margaret possessed this part of the manor in 1347, and when she died it passed to John Woodlock and his wife Agnes. They owned the moiety in 1379 and passed it on to their daughter Joan, who was in possession of it by 1408. Joan had two husbands, William Oysell at the time of her ownership of the moiety and William Park later on. In 1408 the property was transferred to John Fromond, steward of Winchester College. When he died in 1420 all his property in Allington was left to the college, to help clothe the Winchester College Chapel Choir, with his wife retaining a life interest until her death in 1442.

Two years after his wife inherited the other portion of the estate, Robert le Helyon purchased a dwelling and further land from Valentine and Ellen de Chaldecote. All of this passed to his son Thomas in 1326, but within four years the land was owned by another son, Walter, suggesting that Thomas had died. In 1408 this moiety was held by John More and his wife Amice, and they granted a portion of it to John Fromond of Winchester College at the same time as Joan Woodlock's land was transferred to him.

The land that was not transferred to Winchester College passed to John and Amice More's son, Henry, and his wife Christine, then onwards to their son Nicholas. Nicholas More died in 1496 and the land was divided between his infant daughters, Joan and Christine. Christine married John Dawtrey but died without having children, and her portion of the estate transferred to Joan. Joan's first husband was William Ludlow, and her second was Robert Temmes. She outlived them both, having had a son, George, with Ludlow, who inherited the estate on her death in 1563. George Ludlow died in 1580 with his son, Sir Edmund Ludlow, inheriting the estate. In 1618 the king granted Ludlow free warren. In 1622 Ludlow sold the lands for £900 to John Major of Southampton, who died eight years later with the lands passing to his son Richard. When Richard Major died his nephew Major Dunch inherited the manor; by 1672 Dunch was also in possession, though inheritance, of the nearby estates of Baddesley and Townhill before inheriting Major's portion of Allington.

Dunch's properties were inherited by Frances Keck, and purchased by John White in 1750, who passed the estate on to Nathaniel Middleton. Thomas Milne's 1791 map of Hampshire shows several buildings located at Allington. The 1908 Victoria County History indicates that Middleton, who was the Sheriff of Hampshire in 1800, sold the estate, along with Townhill, to William Gater (sometimes recorded as Cator) in 1799 with the property staying in the Gater family until Caleb William Gater of Salisbury sold it to the first Lord Swaythling; other references suggest that Middleton continued to own Allington until his death in 1807, whereupon it was placed on general sale. Advertisements appeared for the estate in the Morning Chronicle in 1808, and a similar notice in an 1812 edition of the Hampshire Telegraph mentions a fishery on the River Itchen being part of the estate.

The enclosure map of 1825 indicates that Allington Manor was owned by Henry Twynam, with two fish ponds located near the manor house – one close by to the west and one further south. The tithe map 20 years later shows that two distinct buildings are now on the site: the manor house was renamed Great Allington House, was squarer in appearance and owned by Edward Twynam, while Little Allington House appeared on the map for the first time. The western pond was now ornamental in nature and had been extended, as had the southern pond which remained in use as a fish pond. An orchard had also been planted behind Great Allington House with some wooded parkland to the south extending beyond the Eastleigh to Fareham railway line, with the rest of the surrounding land given over to arable farming. The estate as a whole was by this time called Allington Farm.

In 1861 Allington was recorded as a tithing of South Stoneham and included the West End ecclesiastical district, including parts of Shamblehurst and Townhill Park. The 1869–90 Ordnance Survey map indicates an orchard, formal garden and heavy planting in front of the Great Allington House and around the fish pond, with the ornamental parkland only extending as far as the railway line.

Great Allington Manor was advertised for sale in 1872, comprising "about 800 acres (320 ha) …of very fertile land, including rich water meadow, arable and pasture land, with ornamental plantations and woods. There is a roomy and comfortable Residence, very substantial, surrounded by beautiful grounds with natural shrubs, timber trees, and ornamental water, beyond which are the well-timbered parklands." The sales notice, which appeared in The Times, also mentions "a new farm building 'which has only recently been erected on an excellent plan, with water power, machinery, and every modern appliance" and the fact that the River Itchen forms two miles of the property boundary. Twenty years later Allington Farm, also referred to as Allington Manor Farm in some literature, was occupied by William Harvey and described as a "modern English farm".

Lord Swaythling purchased the estate at some time between 1899 and 1909 and planned to double the size of Great Allington House. The 1909 Ordnance Survey map shows a conservatory on the southern side of the house.

Princess Clementine and Prince Napoleon of Belgium opened the manor as a sanatorium in August 1915 for 25 Belgian soldiers who had contracted tuberculosis in the trenches of World War I. The Southern Daily Echo reported on the opening and described the house and garden thus:

The house, which stands in 4 acres of ground, has a pleasing exterior, its colouring of white standing out in distinct relief against the surrounding verdure. It is approached by a short, winding carriage drive, on either side of which are several excellent specimens of trees…In the grounds a croquet court has been marked out, and space left for other amusements, whilst beneath the shade of the trees the patients are able to enjoy the fresh air …Behind the house is an orchard surrounding a fish pond, making an ideal setting for a Manor House

— Southern Daily Echo, 1 September 1915

The fish pond was full of reeds and the trees in the parkland were fewer in number according to the 1945 Ordnance Survey map, while the other planting remained in situ. Lord Swaythling put the estate up for sale in 1946, his advertisement in The Times describing "an agricultural, woodland and sporting estate including Allington Manor Farm, 519 acres…having an attractive Georgian manor house" and including 97 acres (39 ha) of oak woodland.

Peter J Rowsell occupied the property in 1963, by which time the ornamental pond was also full of reeds and a separate property had been constructed to the south, named Allston, with 0.84 acres (0.34 ha) of land belonging to it. Four years later, Allington Manor Farm was once again available to buy and advertised in The Times, this time consisting of 324 acres (131 ha) and a "modern house, 6 cottages, ample buildings" but not including Great Allington House or its gardens, or the new Allston property. The manor was occupied by Douglas Campbell-Gray, the son of Angus Campbell-Gray, 22nd Lord Gray, at the time of this sale. A further ten years on, in 1977, the Allington Manor estate was purchased by Dr Ludwig Lowenstein and his wife. Dr Lowenstein was previously a chief educational psychologist and opened Allington Manor as a residential school for excluded children the following year, using the names Southern England Psychological Services and, latterly, Allington Psychological Service.

The southern pond was designated a Site of Importance for Nature Conservation by Eastleigh Borough Council in 2009. As of 2011 the remaining Allington Manor estate comprised 3.035 hectares (7.50 acres), with additional buildings added to the back and side of Great Allington House and a barn was in the process of being converted for residential use. The ornamental pond was reduced in size and oval in shape and the planting around the pond and in front of the property had matured. Some evidence of the former walled garden remained but most of the garden was laid to grass. The former farm had been divided into a number of units and converted into a centre for small businesses, while a number of private residences flanked Great Allington House to the north and south.

Lowenstein was admonished at least twice in court and in various other proceedings for various matters, with allegations of exploiting vulnerable women and children, breaching professional codes of conduct and conditions of registration of Allington Manor as a children's home. In 1996 the registration was cancelled, and in March 1997 the Lowensteins lost their appeal against that cancellation, partly due to the fact the Lowensteins had employed staff with a history of violence and sexual harassment against children. In 2015 he appeared in court and was reprimanded by the judge for exploiting a vulnerable woman by charging her £550 for writing a "court report" that he was not qualified to write and which he knew would be inadmissible in court. Lowenstein died in April 2016.

The Borough of Eastleigh's 2019 local plan discussed the possibility of a new station on the Eastleigh–Fareham line at Allington, which would need to have "two platforms of sufficient length to accommodate up to 12-car trains" and would cost around £8-9 million. A joint statement from the borough council and Network Rail indicated that it was unlikely the station would be built.
