= South Stoneham =

Coordinates: 50.94°N 1.38°W

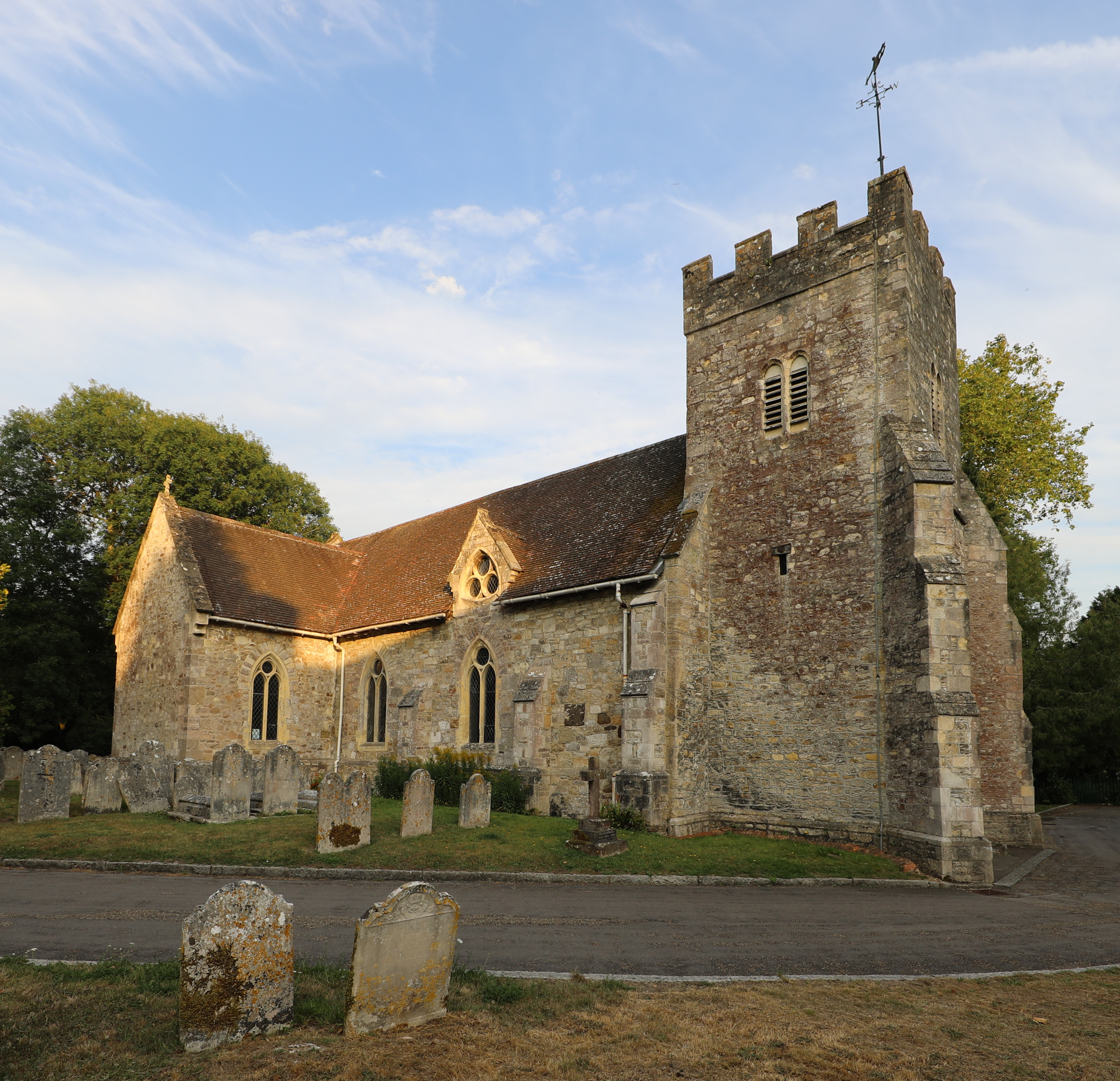
- St Mary's Church

- Location within Hampshire
- Shire county: Hampshire
- Region: South East
- Country: England
- Sovereign state: United Kingdom
- Post town: SOUTHAMPTON
- Postcode district: SO18
- Dialling code: 023

South Stoneham was a manor in South Stoneham parish. It was also a hundred, Poor law union, sanitary district then rural district covering a larger area of south Hampshire, England close to Southampton. In 1911 the parish had a population of 1934.

These last four South Stoneham divisions covered much of modern-day north Southampton suburbs and the Borough of Eastleigh.

The manor house (South Stoneham House) and parish church (St Mary) are in Swaythling. Southampton was a second manor, but took over from South Stoneham as a name in general use.

== Manor and estate of South Stoneham (990–present) ==
A charter dating from 990 relates to the manor of South Stoneham, and archaeological evidence of a Saxon settlement was found during building works in the area immediately around the current South Stoneham House. The manor of South Stoneham was originally called Bishop's Stoneham, and was held by the Bishop of Winchester at the time of the Domesday Book. Other than St. Mary's Church (which is close to South Stoneham House but predates it considerably) and a few adjacent houses, there was no village of "South Stoneham"; instead these adjoined, as it does today, Swaythling ("now practically a suburb of Southampton, and [a] favourite residential quarter"), which became the generally used name for all the rest of the parish.

The tenants of the manor apparently took their name from it; a Gregory de South Stoneham (or Gegory de Stoneham) is recorded there in 1236 and 1249, and in 1315 the manor was held by Nicholas de South Stoneham (son of Guy de South Stoneham). In 1348 Thomas de Stoneham and his wife Alice were lord and lady of the manor, and five heiresses of theirs – possibly daughters – held the manor in 1367. However, that year they quitclaimed it to Adam le Chaundle.

The history is somewhat incomplete after that point, but records do exist of the manor being passed from Nicholas Fitz John to William Nicholl in 1436 and from John Langhorn to Thomas Payne in 1478. After Payne's death the manor passed to John Langhorn's son William, and it remained in the Langhorn family until Stephen Langhorn, or Langher, sold it to John Capelyn for £140 in 1553. The Langhorn family's name remains familiar to present-day residents of the Swaythling area due to the presence of Langhorn Road.

Capelyn sold the manor to William Conway in 1600, who sold it to Edmund Clerke in 1612; Clerke's son inherited the manor in 1634 but only survived for a further two years, at which point the manor passed to Edmund Clerke's 8½-year-old grandson, another Edmund. This Edmund Clerke was the Sheriff of Hampshire and clerk to the Signet in 1671. Clerke the younger married the daughter of Giles Frampton, who took control of the manor after Clerke's death and sold it to Edmund Dummer, a former Surveyor of the Navy, in 1705.

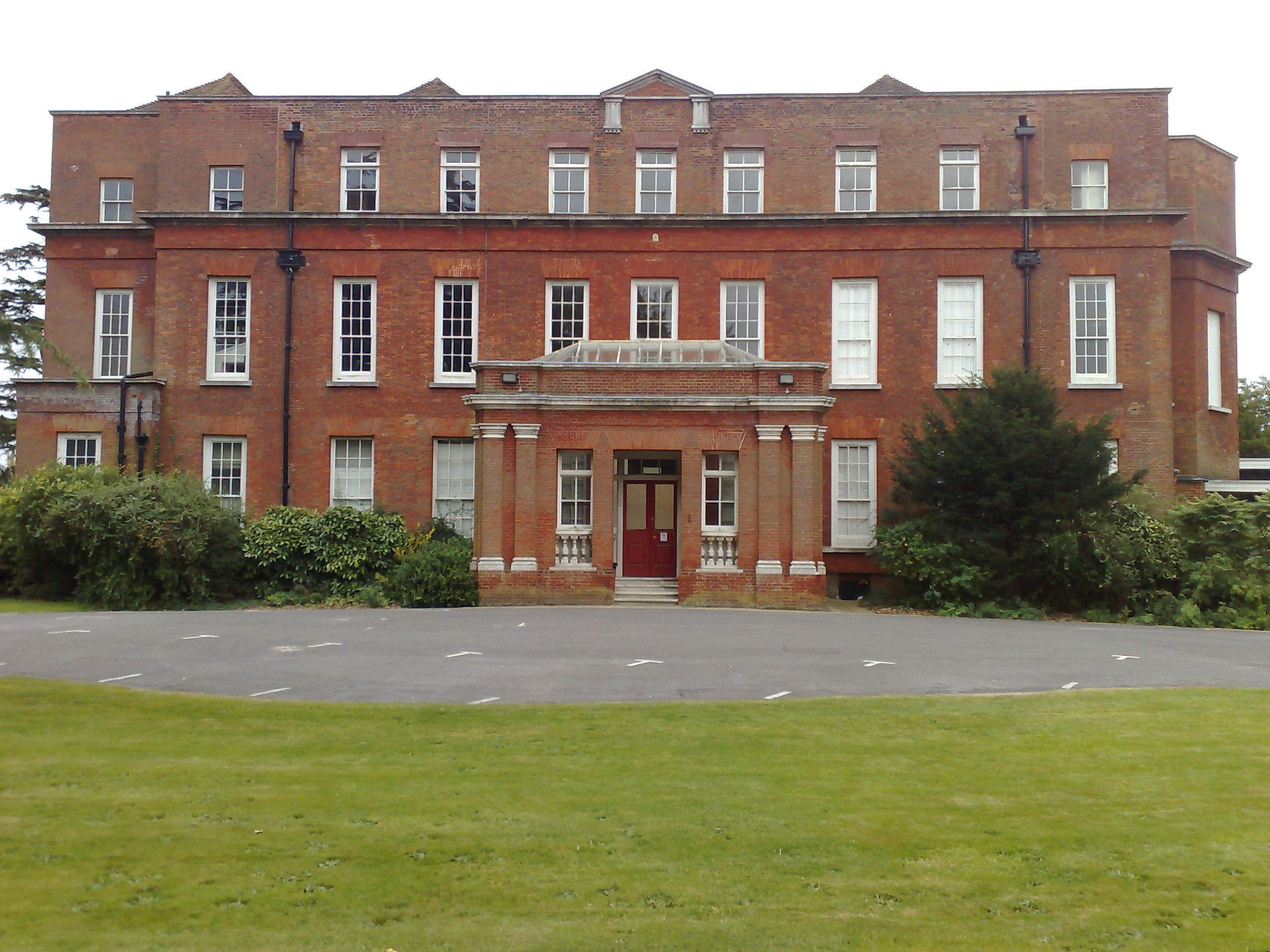
South Stoneham House

South Stoneham House was constructed in 1708 as the Dummers' family home, and has been attributed to Nicholas Hawksmoor. Dummer was from nearby North Stoneham and had been baptised in St. Nicolas' Church there. As of 1915 the grounds of the house comprised 110 acres, with 5 acres of water, and were laid out after 1722 by Capability Brown (though very little of the original landscaping remains).

Edmund Dummer was declared bankrupt in 1711 and he died in debtors' prison two years later. His cousin Thomas, a lawyer who had acquired the manor on Edmund's behalf, fought a lawsuit attempting to gain control of the property; however in 1716, Edward Nicholas of Newton Valence took ownership of South Stoneham. William Sloane, whose brother founded the British Museum, purchased the manor from Nicholas in 1740, and it was subsequently owned by his son Hans Sloane, Jean Louis Bazalgette, and John Lane. Lane was declared bankrupt and the manor was put up for sale in 1815 after which it was bought by John Willis Fleming, who also owned the manor of North Stoneham where a new house was being built for him at North Stoneham Park.

When the new North Stoneham House was completed, John Willis Fleming moved there and leased South Stoneham House to General Joseph Gubbins until the general's death in 1832. In 1831 there was a major fire at North Stoneham, and John Willis Fleming returned to live in South Stoneham House again after Gubbins' death while North Stoneham was rebuilt. When this was completed in 1834 South Stoneham House was again advertised to let, and again in 1843. Mrs Charlotte Maria Beckford leased the property and died at South Stoneham House in 1854, after which Thomas Willis Fleming (second son of John) moved in. He purchased the property from his elder brother in 1857 and lived there until 1861. The Willis Flemings sold South Stoneham House for £20,000 in 1875 (or 1878 according to some sources), to Captain Thomas Davison (or Daveson). Included in the sale catalogue issued on 23 November 1875 was Wood Mill (still standing and operating as an outdoor activities centre as of 2013), Gascon Cottage, and land for building. "Gascon's Meadow with house thereon in South Stoneham" was reconveyanced the next year.

In 1888 South Stoneham House was purchased from Davison by Samuel Montagu, 1st Baron Swaythling. Eleven years later he also purchased Townhill Park House for his son Louis, who continued to live at Townhill after Samuel's death in 1911. By 1915 the estate's grounds consisted of 110 acres, with 5 acres of water, compared to the much larger parish (1,296 acres, 26 of water).

South Stoneham House was acquired, with South Hill (some two miles to the northwest), in 1920 to house male students at University College Southampton, later to become the University of Southampton, who still own the building as at January 2015.

== Parish ==
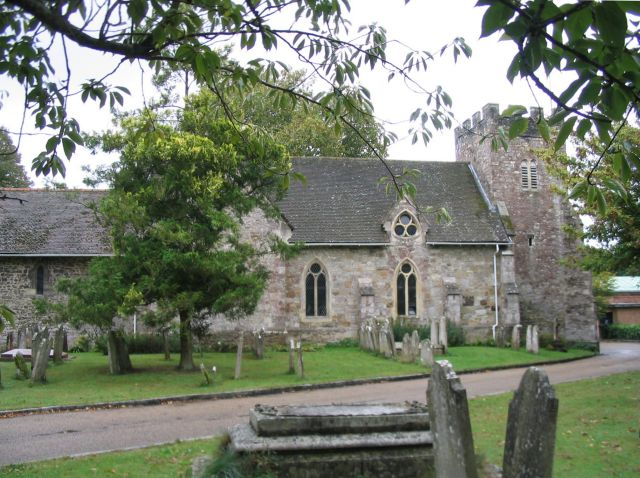
St Mary's Church

The original parish of South Stoneham covered over 8,000 acres (32.37 km^{2}; 12.50 sq mi) and extended along the eastern side of the River Itchen from the site of the present day Eastleigh in the north to just above Northam Bridge in the south, and from Swaythling to the outskirts of the original town of Southampton on the western side of the river, and, prior to boundary changes in 1891–94, comprised the eight tithings of Allington, Barton, Bitterne, Boyatt, Eastleigh, Pollack, Portswood, and Shamblehurst. Other than the parish church of St Mary and a few adjacent houses, there was no village of "South Stoneham".

In the Domesday Book, the church at South Stoneham was the property of Richer the clerk, "who held this, with two dependent churches near Southampton, of the bishop of Winchester". Richer ("Richerius") was also the priest and holder of the benefice of St. Mary's Church at Southampton. The parish was listed as "Stanham – Manebrige Hundred – Hantscire".

By the 16th century, South Stoneham was described as "an appropriation of St. Mary's Church, Southampton" and both churches were in the gift and under the special jurisdiction of the Bishop of Winchester. The living at South Stoneham then became the gift of the rector of St. Mary's, Southampton, who held the right of presentation until the early 20th century.

In 1851 the parish had a population of 4961.

As a result of the expansion of Southampton, the Local Government Act 1894 caused much of the parish of South Stoneham to be incorporated into newly formed neighbouring civil parishes, with the remaining parish covering 1,296 acres (5.24 km^{2}; 2.03 sq mi). However the parish was still extensive, taking in the areas of Bevois Valley, Portswood, Mansbridge and what is now Bitterne Park as well as part of the village of Swaythling (the northern part of the village was in the North Stoneham parish). It also included Allington (now within West End) and Shamblehurst (now in Hedge End). On 9 November 1920 the parish was abolished to form Southampton St Nicholas, part also went to West End.

== Poor law union (1835–1930) ==
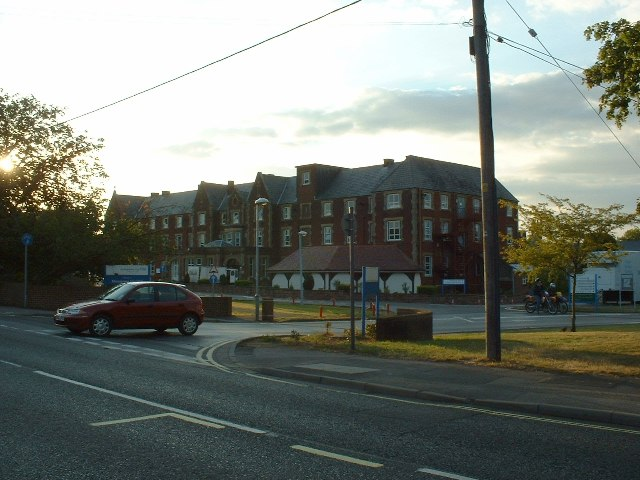
South Stoneham Workhouse, today better known as Moorgreen Hospital

South Stoneham Poor Law Union was formed on 25 March 1835 with nine constituent parishes and overseen by a board of 16 governors. The original nine parishes were Botley, Burlesdon, Chilworth, Hamble, Hound, Milbrook, North Stoneham, St Mary's Extra, and South Stoneham. In 1851 the Union covered an area of 30,715 acres and had a population of 15,974. Following boundary changes in 1894 the parishes of Bitterne, Eastleigh, Hedge End, Itchen, Portswood, Shirley, Sholing and West End were added to the union.

== Sanitary district (1875–1894) ==
Sanitary districts were established in England and Wales in 1875. In rural districts (as South Stoneham was at the time), they were coterminous with the existing poor law unions. As well as the Rural Sanitary Authority, a South Stoneham Highways Board was established.

== Rural district (1894–1932) ==
South Stoneham Rural District was established by the Local Government Act 1894, replacing the sanitary authority. The Highways Board continued to meet separately from the new district council. South Stoneham Rural District was divided and merged into other authorities in 1932, one part of it becoming part of Winchester Rural District and the other joining the Southampton Corporation.

== Notable people ==
- Daniel Grose (1903–1971), first-class cricketer and British Army officer
- Kenneth Robinson (1897–1963), first-class cricketer and Royal Navy officer
- Giles Stibbert (1734–1809), was Commander-in-Chief, India, twice. 1777 to 1779 and 1783–1785.
