= Gaters Mill =

Complex of buildings in West End, Hampshire, England

- Location within Southampton
- 50°56′17″N 1°21′22″W
- Location: Mansbridge Road
- OS grid reference: SU 45421 15541

History
- Built: 16th Century

Site notes
- Area: West End, Hampshire

Listed Building – Grade II
- Official name: 1 and 2 Mansbridge Road, 1 and 2 Gaters Hill
- Designated: 3 Oct 1978
- Reference no.: 1111935

Gaters Mill is a complex of buildings on the River Itchen in the civil parish of West End, Hampshire. The complex forms part of the Gaters Mill & Romill Close Conservation Area, and includes a Grade II listed farmhouse and some cottages from a farm called Black Farm. The boundary of the borough runs alongside Gaters Mill, and the other side of the border is part of the Itchen Valley Conservation Area, designated by Southampton City Council.

== History ==
There have been mills on the site since the 13th or 14th century. The timber-framed Black Farm farmhouse dates from the 16th century. The mill had several previous names, namely South Stoneham Mill, Up Mill and Mansbridge Mill. The original mills were fulling mills, but in 1685 the mill - at that time known as Up Mill - was established as a paper mill, belonging to a company whose charter was granted by James II. The company consisted of fifteen members, of which nine were French refugees, mainly Huguenots. They were joined in 1702 by another Huguenot named Henry Portal, who went on to establish a further paper mill at Laverstoke near Whitchurch in 1718, and six years later he was awarded the contract for making paper for bank notes.

The mill stopped being used for manufacturing paper in 1865, at which point it was largely demolished and rebuilt as a flour mill.

The buildings were damaged in a major fire in 1916–17 and several were replaced. During the Second World War the complex was used as a munitions store and suffered further damage. Subsequently, the buildings were occupied by small businesses and the Lower Itchen Fishery Ltd; in the 1990s the buildings were redeveloped and refurbished for use as offices.

The farmhouse, formerly Black Farm, was Grade II listed on 3 October 1978. The area around Gaters Mill was designated a conservation area by Eastleigh Borough Council on 25 May 1989, and this was extended to include the nearby street, Romill Close, on 12 September 1991.

== See also ==
- List of watermills in the United Kingdom
