= Riverside Park, Southampton =

Public park in Southampton, England

Riverside Park
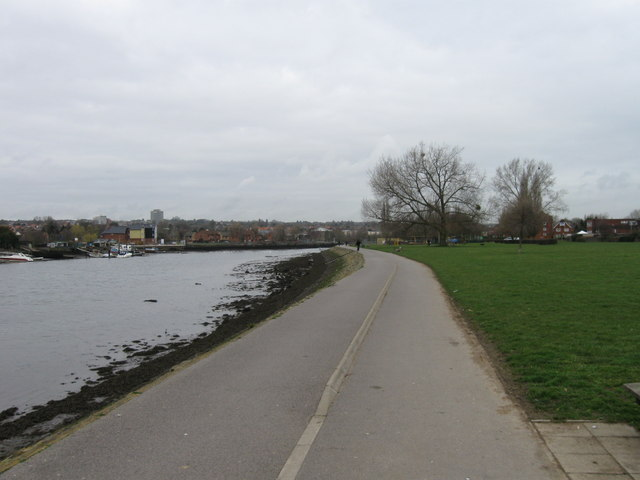
- The Main path along the River Itchen

- Location within Southampton
- Type: Public park
- Location: Southampton, Hampshire, England
- Coordinates: 50°56′04″N 1°22′31″W
- Area: 32 ha (79 acres)
- Operator: Southampton City Council
- Open: Open year-round
- Awards: Green Flag Award
- Paths: Itchen Way
- Water: River Itchen
- Website: https://www.southampton.gov.uk/people-places/parks-open-spaces/parks/find-a-park/riverside-park/

Riverside Park is a public park located in Southampton, England. The 32-hectare (320,000 m^{2}) site is located along the River Itchen and bounded by the districts of Townhill Park to the east and Swaythling to the northwest. The park's northernmost point backs onto the M27 motorway with pedestrian access to Itchen Valley Country Park. The southernmost point of the park backs onto Bitterne Triangle and Cobden Bridge.

While maintained by Southampton City Council, Friends of Riverside Park is a local voluntary organisation, which facilitates the pitch bookings and organise regular litterpicking events. The organisation also promotes the park with events such as Trifest to advertise local vendors, musicians and traders.

The park has a range of facilities including six football pitches, three playgrounds, two cricket fields, a tennis court and a skate park. There is also a cafe, as well as a miniature railway and an activity centre.

== History ==
In spring 1949, the Southern Daily Echo reported ambitious plans to develop a new park along the River Itchen in the Bitterne Park area of Southampton. More open spaces were required with the growth of the city's population. A shortage of building materials in post-war Britain prevented the city council from implementing its plans.

The area was previously an unofficial rubbish tip, mainly in the area of the present-day sports pitches. In 1952, the tip was 8 feet (2.4 m) deep with an estimated 130,000 tones of rubbish which included World War II debris from the city's aerial bombardment. The council reclaimed the land between Cobden Bridge and Bitterne Park using 5,000 lorries fully laden with topsoil.

The park formerly had a Pitch and Putt course. In the late 2010s, facing financial difficulties, Southampton City Council removed the £15,000 annual subsidy for the course. Initially, the family of a fairground operator, Cole and Sons, took over the operation to save it from closure. After a year of operation, the high running and maintenance costs led to the pitch being permanently closed.

In 2022, Riverside Park received the Green Flag Award. In February of the same year, as part of The Queen's Green Canopy for the Platinum Jubilee, works began at Riverside Park to plant 70 oak trees along the river bank, funded by Southampton City Council.

== Woodmill Activity Centre ==
Located in the northern sector of the park is the Woodmill Activity Centre, which includes kayak and canoe rentals. Raft building and paddleboarding are also available. On land, the centre has archery and laser tag as well as axe throwing. Outdoor activities such as orienteering, building campfires and bushcraft are available.

== Miniature Railway ==
The park hosts a miniature railway run and operated by Southampton and District Society of Model Engineers. The track opened in 1962 after Southampton City Council allowed for a raised track for 3.5-inch (8.9 cm) and 5-inch (13 cm) miniatures in the area known as Cobden Meadows.
