= Daniel Grose =

English cricketer

Personal information
- Full name: Daniel Charles Evans Grose
- Born: 3 April 1903; South Stoneham, Hampshire, England
- Died: 14 November 1971 (aged 68); Tonbridge, Kent, England
- Batting: Right-handed

Domestic team information
- Years: Team
- 1923: Wiltshire

Career statistics
Competition	First-class
Matches	4
Runs scored	113
Batting average	14.12
100s/50s	–/–
Top score	35
Catches/stumpings	3/–
- Source: Cricinfo, 9 January 2019

Daniel Charles Evans Grose (3 April 1903 – 14 November 1971) was an English first-class cricketer and British Army officer. He entered the Royal Engineers in 1923, with appearances in first-class cricket for the British Army cricket team coming in 1925 and 1927. He was taken prisoner by the Japanese following the Battle of Hong Kong in December 1941, spending the remainder of the war as a prisoner of war. Following the war he retired from the military in 1948, and later served as a senior administrator for the Tunbridge Wells Hospital Group from 1966 to 1970.

== Early life and military career ==
The son of Lieutenant Colonel Daniel Charles Evans Grose and Ida Macdonald, Grose was born at South Stoneham in Hampshire and was educated at Felsted School. After leaving Felsted he attended the Royal Military Academy, graduating into the Royal Engineers as a second lieutenant in February 1923. In August of that year he played minor counties cricket for Wiltshire, making two appearances in the Minor Counties Championship. He became a lieutenant in February 1925.

Grose made his debut in first-class cricket for the British Army cricket team against Cambridge University at Fenner's in 1925, with a further appearance in that same year against Oxford University. He made two further first-class appearances against the same opposition in 1927. Across his four matches for the Army, he scored 113 runs with a high score of 35. He was promoted to the rank of captain in January 1934. In February 1935, Grose was made an adjutant in the 48th (South Midland) Division. His hobbies around this time included flying, where he was a member of the Bristol and Wessex Aeroplane Club in 1936.

== World War II and later life ==
Serving during the Second World War, he became a major in January 1940. By December 1941, he was commanding 22nd Fortress Company of the Royal Engineers at Hong Kong. He was present for the Fall of Hong Kong to the Japanese in December 1941, during which he was captured and spent the remainder of the war as a prisoner of war; his wife and children were also captured and interned at Baguio in the Philippines. He was repatriated to Manila following the end of the war in September 1945. He continued to serve in the army following the war. He retired from military service in August 1948, upon which he was granted the honorary rank of lieutenant colonel and ceased to be liable for recall in the reserves in October 1958.

Grose was active in his local community in Tunbridge Wells, where he was the chairman of the Tunbridge Wells Hospital Group from 1966 to 1970. He died in November 1971 at Tonbridge, aged 68.
