= The Gregg School =

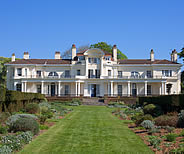

Location
- Southampton, Hampshire, SO18 2GF; United Kingdom; 50.931°N 1.358°W

Information
- Type: Private day school
- Motto: Vestigia Nulla Retrorsum (Latin: "always stepping forward")
- Established: 1901
- Department for Education URN: 116568 Tables
- Head Mistress: Sherilee Helen Sellers
- Gender: Coeducational
- Age: 11 to 16
- Enrolment: 300~
- Houses: Roman , Spartan , Trojan
- Colours: Sky Blue & Navy Blue &
- Song: To Be a Pilgrim
- Alumni: Gregorians
- Website: www.thegreggschool.org

The Gregg School is a non-selective independent day school for pupils from Year R to Year 11 in Townhill Park, Southampton, Hampshire, UK. The school occupies Townhill Park House and its grounds. It was founded in Southampton in 1901 and has more than 350 pupils and staff. The Gregg School is not a fully academically selective school. Selection is made through an entry assessment and references from the student's previous school.

== History ==
The secondary school is the only surviving member in the UK of a commercial chain of schools in the British Isles and North America founded by John Robert Gregg, an Irish-born American, originally to teach his method of shorthand.

(A sister secondary school, the Gregg High School for Girls in Jesmond, Newcastle closed in the 1960s.)

It was founded in 1901 as a commercial school in the docklands of Southampton. In the 1920s it joined the Gregg chain and moved to Grosvenor Square in the Regency district of the city.

Over the next few decades the school expanded and broadened the range of subjects taught. It opened a secondary school to teach conventional academic subjects in Winn Road (which is now home to the Gregg Preparatory school, formerly St Winifred's).

It bought Townhill Park in 1994.

The school went into administrative receivership in 1995, but was restored to the register of companies in 1997. A charity, The Gregg School and St Winifred School Trust, was founded in 1998 to run the school.

Sherilee Sellers is the head. She succeeded Roger Hart, who had been at the school for 39 years when he retired.

== Former pupils ==
The school's alumni include Millvina Dean, last survivor of the RMS Titanic, and Sally Matthews, British opera singer.

The school started an Alumni Association in 2009.
