= Kenneth Robinson (cricketer) =

English cricketer and Royal Navy officer

Personal information
- Full name: Kenneth Mark Lefebre Robinson
- Born: 16 February 1897; South Stoneham, Hampshire, England
- Died: 9 January 1963 (aged 65); Alverstoke, Hampshire, England
- Batting: Right-handed
- Bowling: Right-arm medium

Career statistics
Competition	First-class
Matches	1
Runs scored	14
Batting average	7.00
100s/50s	–/–
Top score	13
Catches/stumpings	–/–
- Source: Cricinfo, 22 September 2019

Kenneth Mark Lefebre Robinson (16 February 1897 – 9 January 1963) was an English first-class cricketer and Royal Navy officer.

Robinson was born in Hampshire at South Stoneham in February 1897. He served in the Royal Navy in the First World War, during which he was promoted from the rank of midshipman to sub-lieutenant in December 1916. In the closing stages of the war, he was promoted from the rank of acting lieutenant to lieutenant in June 1918. He was later promoted to the rank of lieutenant commander in January 1926. The following year he made a single appearance in first-class cricket for the Royal Navy against the touring New Zealanders at Portsmouth in 1927. Batting twice in the match, he was dismissed for 13 runs in the Royal Navy first-innings by Bill Cunningham, while in their second-innings he was dismissed for a single run by Ernest Bernau. Robinson was promoted to the rank of commander in December 1931, before being loaned to the Royal Australian Navy from 1932–34. Returning to the Royal Navy, he served aboard HMS Colombo as its acting captain from December 1944 to mid–1945. He retired from active service in March 1947. Robinson died in January 1963 at Alverstoke, Hampshire.
