= St James' Church, West End =

Church in West End, Hampshire

Coordinates: 50°55′28″N 1°20′18″W

St James' Church
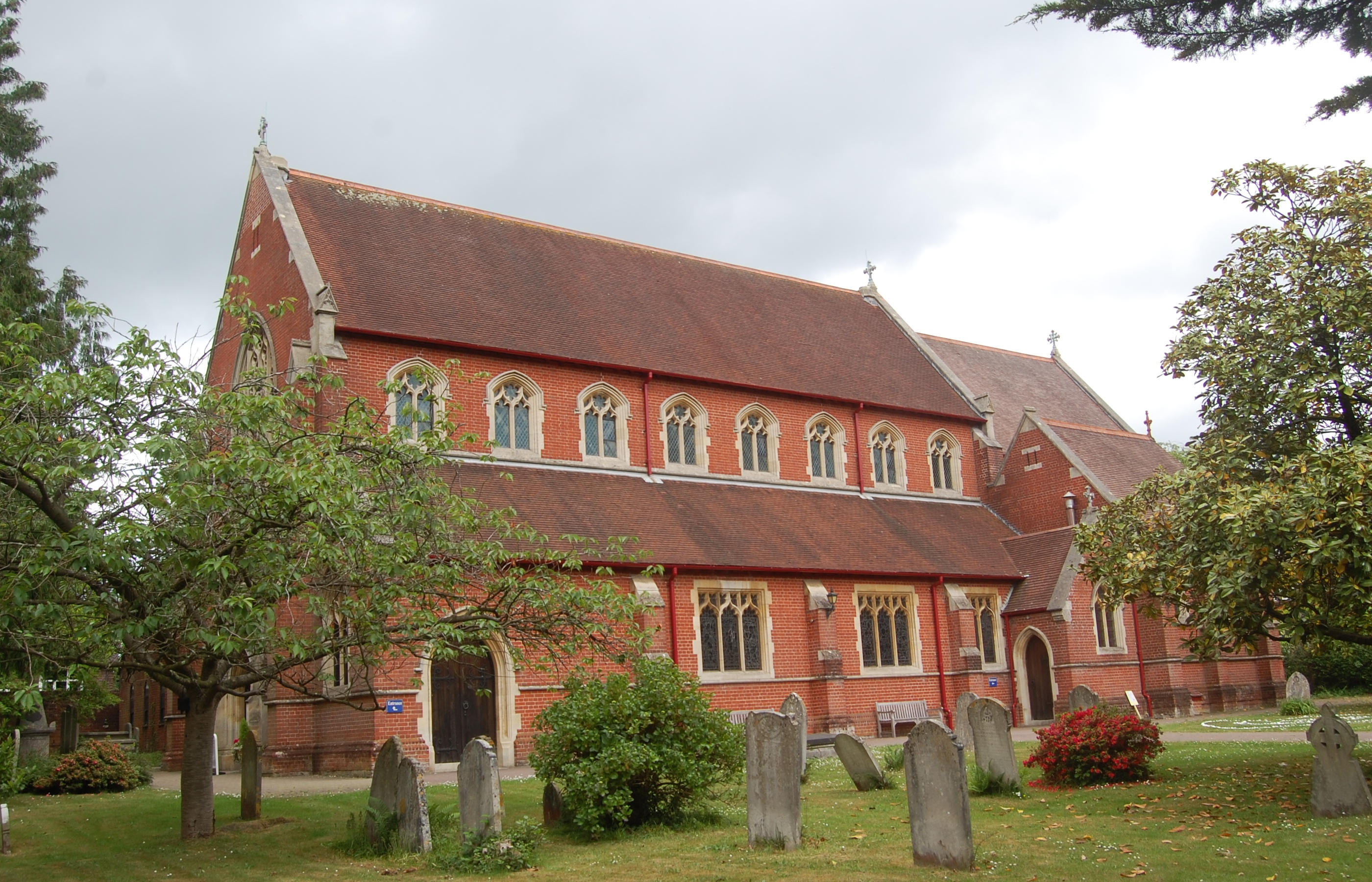
- St James' Church in 2019

- Denomination: Church of England
- Website: http://www.stjameswestend.org.uk/

History
- Founded: 18 April 1836

Architecture
- Heritage designation: Grade II listed
- Architect: Arthur Blomfield
- Style: 15th century gothic
- Completed: 1890

Administration
- Province: Canterbury
- Diocese: Winchester
- Deanery: Eastleigh
- Benefice: West End
- Parish: West End

St James' Church in West End, Hampshire is an Anglican parish church in the Borough of Eastleigh. The church building is grade II listed.

== History ==
The church was founded on 18 April 1836 with the first church building being completed in 1838. It was constructed on top of a hill, made of brick with lead ridging, iron and lead gutters, rainwater pipes and two iron chimneys. The building had a tower with a brick spire, which had an iron bar on top but no lightning conductor. At 5pm on 12th June 1875, the spire was struck by lightning and needed to be demolished, but the tower and the rest of the building was unscathed, as was a tree in close proximity to the tower. However, the branches of some trees further away needed to be removed as they had been damaged by stones flying from the lightning-struck spire. To make the tower waterproof following the demolition of the spire, a small hipped roof was added.

The original church building was replaced with the current one, which was constructed in 1890. The new structure was designed by Sir Arthur Blomfield in a 15th-century gothic style. The intention was to include a tower at the western end of the church, but this was never built.

On 14 February 1983 the church building was listed as a grade II historic building.

Footballer Alan Shearer was married in the church in June 1991.
