= Townhill Park House =

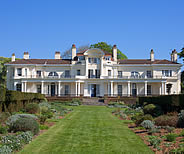
- The western face of the house

- Location within Southampton
- Former names: Townhill Farm

General information
- Status: Completed
- Type: House (now used as a school)
- Architectural style: Italianate
- Location: Southampton, Townhill Park / Chartwell Green
- Coordinates: 50.9333°N 1.358°W
- Owner: The Gregg School

Technical details
- Floor count: 2

Design and construction
- Architect: Leonard Rome Guthrie
- Other designers: Gertrude Jekyll
- Designations: Grade II listed

Townhill Park House is a Grade II listed former manor house between the neighbouring housing estates of Townhill Park in Southampton and Chartwell Green in Eastleigh.

== History ==
The Manor of Townhill was granted to Sir William Paulet by Henry VIII in 1536 after the Dissolution of the Monasteries. The land was mainly used for farming, and became known as Townhill Farm.

Townhill Farm became part of the Manor of South Stoneham, but was purchased in 1787 by Nathaniel Middleton, who had made his fortune in the service of the British East India Company. He turned the farmhouse into a private home, and the estate became known as Townhill Park. He enlarged the farmhouse, but a fire resulted in a complete revamp of the property in 1793. Then in 1820 William Hallett bought, and lived in the house for 20 years. The property later passed into the hands of the Gater family, who also owned the nearby Gaters Mill near Mansbridge.

In 1897, Townhill Farm was purchased by Samuel Montagu, 1st Baron Swaythling, for his son Louis (who became the second Baron Swaythling in 1911) while the first baron continued to live at South Stoneham House. In 1912, extensive further modiciations were made to the building by architect Leonard Rome Guthrie, who returned after the First World War to add the music room and a boudoir for Lady Swaythling. The gardens at Townhill Park were laid out by Gertrude Jekyll and were noted for their rhododendrons, azaleas and camellias.

The estate included an airfield, where Gustav Hamel was observed flying a loop-the-loop in 1913. The Montagu Family lived in Townhill Park until the mid-1940s.

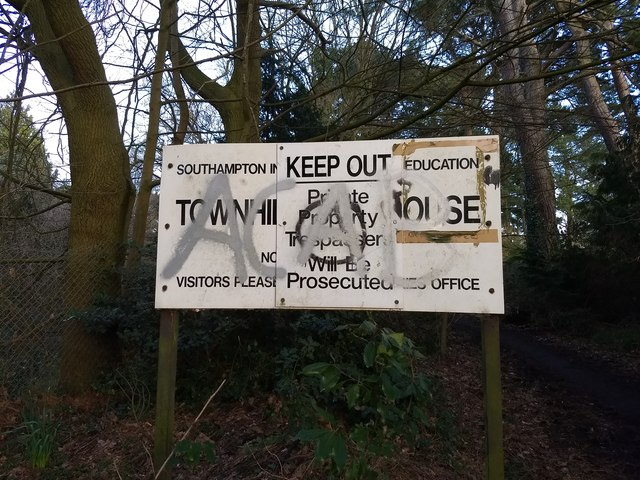
The entrance sign for the 1969 school still stands at the end of River Walk

The property was sold in 1948. 294 acres (1.19 km^{2}) were sold to Southampton Borough Council for housing, and the suburb of Townhill Park came into existence. Meanwhile, the house itself and the remaining 30 acres (120,000 m^{2}) of land became a school for underprivileged girls, owned and operated by Middlesex County Council. The school closed in 1969 and the building was acquired by Southampton City Council. From 1971, the building was used as a hostel for Merchant Navy cadets, housing 75, until 1984 when the house became a conference centre.

In 1994, Townhill Park House was purchased by The Gregg School. The Friends of Townhill Park Gardens was established in 1997 to restore the gardens, which are now open to the public on four days each year. The house, too, is occasionally open for guided tours. The house is a grade II listed building.

== Architecture ==
The house is roughly L-shaped, with its outermost faces to the north and west. The original villa of 1795 forms the central portion of the house, including the north elevation, while the west elevation is the Italianate addition from the early 20th century designed by Guthrie. The house has two storeys.

The north elevation is stuccoed and has five bays of sash windows, with the central three breaking forward under a pediment with a blank cartouche. On the upper storey of this central section there are blank panels above the windows, which have moulded architraves with keystones. At ground floor level there is an arcade of three arches, again with keystones. All the windows on the north elevation have glazing bars and wooden shutters. The original doors have been replaced with modern ones.

The south face is similar to the north, with the differences that there is a sundial set into the pediment and the arches on the ground floor have triple-round heads with Tuscan half columns.

As well as the house itself, the stable block is also Grade II listed. The exact date of construction of this building is unknown but estimated to be in the 1830s. It is a two-storey building of colourwashed brick walls and a slate roof. The roof is hipped and has a low pitch.

== Grounds and gardens ==
The estate today consists of a landscaped park of roughly 12 hectares, but covered 324 hectares in 1948. The park contains a woodland garden and formal gardens close to the house itself, including Italianate gardens designed by Leonard Rome Guthrie from 1912 and planting schemes by Gertrude Jekyll dating from 1912/13.

The First Lord Swaythling commissioned Guthrie's design which included significant changes to the house as well as the gardens. An Italianate style was applied to both, with new terraces, a rose garden and tennis lawns being laid out. The woodland dell and arboretum were later additions commissioned by the Second Lord Swaythling after his father's death.

== Interior ==
The music room that was added after the First World War is now used as a main hall, and retains its original polished walnut panelling. However most of the other original furnishings and pictures were sold when the Montagu family moved out in 1945.

The music room measures 48 feet (15 m) by 24 feet (7.3 m).
