= Chartwell Green =

Suburb of Southampton, England

Coordinates: 50°56′N 1°21′W

Chartwell Green / Townhill Farm
- Suburb
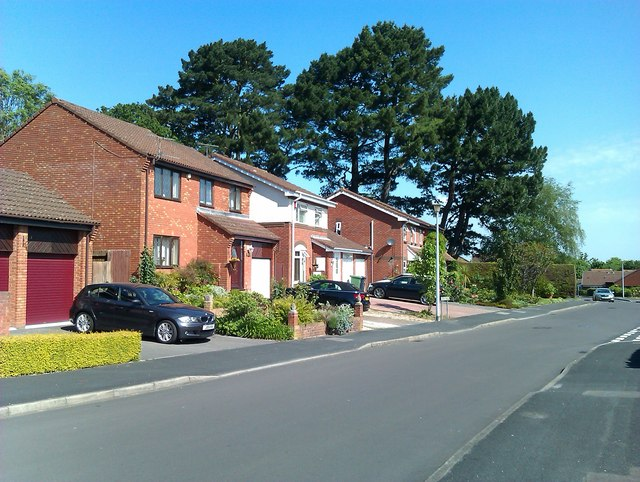
- Houses in Arun Road

- Location within Hampshire
- OS grid reference: SU457147
- Civil parish: West End
- District: Eastleigh
- Shire county: Hampshire
- Region: South East
- Country: England
- Sovereign state: United Kingdom
- Post town: SOUTHAMPTON
- Postcode district: SO18
- Dialling code: 023
- Police: Hampshire and Isle of Wight
- Fire: Hampshire and Isle of Wight
- Ambulance: South Central
- UK Parliament: Eastleigh

Chartwell Green is a suburb of Southampton, England, although it falls outside the formal city boundary. Instead, Chartwell Green is part of the West End parish, within the Borough of Eastleigh.

The main parade of shops in Chartwell Green is sometimes referred to as Townhill Farm, after the nearby Townhill Park House. The Townhill Farm Community Centre was built in 1991 and comprises an entrance foyer, toilets, a main hall with adjacent store room, a committee room and adjacent kitchen, and a café area overlooking a patio and garden. The building is owned by Southampton City Council and is on a 125-year lease; until 2006, it was managed by Eastleigh Borough Council but then this task was transferred to West End Parish Council.

The bulk of Chartwell Green was built in the late 1980s, and comes under the postal code of SO18 3xx.
