= Moorgreen Hospital =

- Southampton City Primary Care Trust
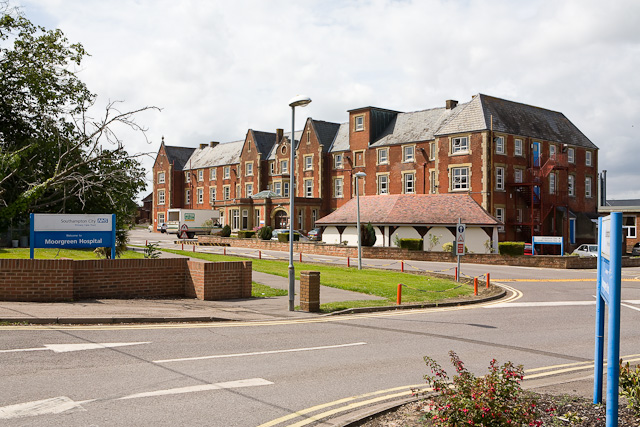
- Moorgreen Hospital

- Location in Hampshire

Geography
- Location: West End, Hampshire, England, United Kingdom
- Coordinates: 50.928°N 1.323°W

Organisation
- Care system: Public NHS
- Type: Community

Services
- Emergency department: No Accident & Emergency
- Beds: 78

History
- Founded: 1848
- Closed: 2007

Links
- Website: www.southamptonhealth.nhs.uk
- Lists: Hospitals in England

Moorgreen Hospital was a community hospital in West End, near Southampton. It was managed by Southampton City Primary Care Trust.

== History ==
The hospital has its origins in the South Stoneham Union Workhouse designed by Charles Henman and William Hinves and built at a cost of £7,000 in 1848. The workhouse was designed to house around 250 inmates, but had only 100 in 1841 and 225 in 1871. 8 acres of land surrounding the building were attached to the workhouse and cultivated by the inmates; other activities undertaken by the inmates included picking oakum, making shoes, and tailoring clothes.

The workhouse became a Public Assistance Institution known as the West End Institution in 1930 and it converted into a health facility and became known as Moorgreen Hospital on joining the National Health Service in 1948. Countess Mountbatten House, which was then only the United Kingdom's second NHS palliative care hospice opened on the site in 1977. Facilities created in the hospice included 27 beds and a day care centre with physiotherapy facilities. In September 2018, it was announced that a new ground-breaking partnership was being established with Mountbatten Isle of Wight. Providing their leadership and support, the formerly NHS-run Countess Mountbatten Hospice has been able to develop their services as an independent charity. In April 2019, a new bereavement service was launched. In 2020, Countess Mountbatten Hospice was renamed Mountbatten Hampshire to reflect the new partnership and developing services to people living in Southampton and west Hampshire.

Mental health services were transferred into a newly refurbished facility known as the Tom Rudd Unit in 2007. Although much of the site closed at that time, the Tom Rudd Unit was refurbished and has housed the Willow Assessment and Treatment Unit, operated by Southern Health for adults with complex learning disabilities, since 2012.

Although Mountbatten Hampshire hospice (formerly Countess Mountbatten Hospice) and the Tom Rudd Unit remain operational, the rest of the hospital site was redeveloped for residential purposes in 2017. The main workhouse building, which is locally listed, and the two gatehouses, were retained and converted into 19 flats, while the other former hospital buildings on the site were demolished and replaced by newer buildings.

== See also ==
- List of hospitals in England
