= West End, Hampshire =

Village and parish in Hampshire, England

Coordinates: 50°55′39″N 1°20′06″W

West End
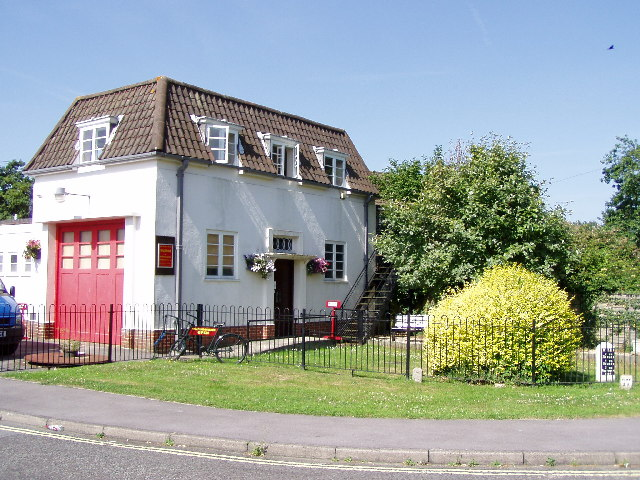
- The old West End fire station, designed by Herbert Collins

- Location within Hampshire
- Population: 11,470 (2011 Census)
- OS grid reference: SU471138
- Civil parish: West End
- District: Eastleigh
- Shire county: Hampshire
- Region: South East
- Country: England
- Sovereign state: United Kingdom
- Post town: SOUTHAMPTON
- Postcode district: SO30, SO18
- Dialling code: 023
- Police: Hampshire and Isle of Wight
- Fire: Hampshire and Isle of Wight
- Ambulance: South Central
- UK Parliament: Eastleigh
- Website: West End Parish Council

West End is a parish in Hampshire in the borough of Eastleigh, five miles (8.0 km) east of the city of Southampton. The village of West End is small and generally classed as an area in the outer suburbs or rural urban fringe of the borough of Eastleigh because of the surrounding woodland and countryside, including Telegraph Woods and Itchen Valley Country Park.

The village is known for being home of the Utilita Bowl, the stadium where Hampshire County Cricket Club plays, and occasionally England. Aside from a typical number of listed houses, the other main landmarks of the parish are Moorgreen Hospital — a large, ornate Victorian building, the original St James School, built in 1901, on the high street, and West End Fire Station — a museum in the centre of the village.

== History ==
=== Early history ===
A series of round barrows, dating from the Bronze Age (2000-600 BC), have been discovered in the Moorgreen area of the parish. There were five of these to the north of the former Moorgreen Hospital site. A hilltop fort from the Iron Age was built on the ridge above the village around 600-100BC. A shutter telegraph station operated from the site during the Napoleonic Wars, forming part of the line connecting London to Plymouth. It was this station that gave the name to the nearby Telegraph Woods.

The village was originally a hamlet which grew up around a track between Romsey and Portsmouth. The hamlet had a chapel by 1552 primarily for the use of the lords of the manor of Allington. When the track became a turnpike road in the early 19th century, the hamlet began to grow.

=== 19th century ===
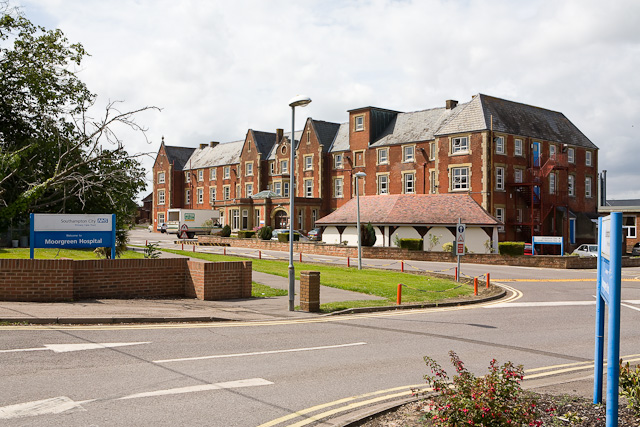
The main building of Moorgreen Hospital, originally a workhouse

In 1838, a national school was opened to house 192 children. St James' Church was founded in the same year.

The hamlet was mostly within the tithing of Shamblehurst, with a small section at the northern end in the tithing of Allington, both within the parish of South Stoneham. The ecclesiastical parish of West End was established in 1840, two years after the construction of the original St James' Church. In 1846 a Bible Christian chapel was constructed in Chapel Road.

A poor house had existed at the eastern end of the village for some time, and in 1848 this was replaced by a red-brick workhouse. This eventually became Moorgreen Hospital.

An extra room was added to the national school in 1866. In 1871 an independent school for younger children was opened, having been built by Mrs Harriet Hazlefoot.

In 1890, the spire of St James' was struck by lightning and the building was replaced. The civil parish was established in 1894. A number of boundary changes have taken place since then.

Harriet Hazlefoot's school became the infants' department of the national school in 1894.

=== 20th century ===
During the 20th century, the school moved again into a new (third) building and was renamed St James' Primary School. The second school building became Hilldene Community Centre, where a number of adult education courses and other activities take place.

In 1900, two further Methodist chapels were built, one in the Moorgreen area and one in Swaythling Road. In September 1904 the children of the national school were moved to a new location with the old school building becoming the parish hall.

The fire station was opened in May 1939 by Mrs Pearson of Oaklands in Allington Lane. The station was crewed by a mixture of National Fire Service and Auxiliary Fire Service personnel, and the station housed a Dennis New World fire engine.

In 1954, Harefield was transferred out of the civil parish and into Southampton.

The Roman Catholic church of St Brigid was opened in the village in 1961.

The fire station was closed in 1996 and the building was transferred to the parish council to run as a community venue. West End Local History Society, established at the same time, set up its museum in the building.

=== 21st century ===
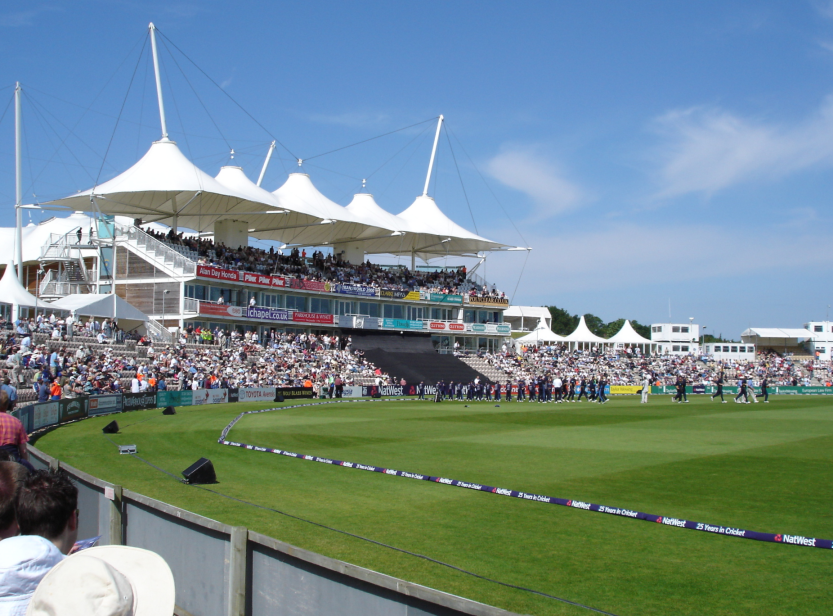
The Utilita Bowl

Hampshire County Cricket Club's home ground, the Utilita Bowl cricket ground, was built in 2000 along with an accompanying hotel and conference facilities and a 18-hole golf course. It has hosted several international cricket games and a number of well known musical acts such as Oasis, The Who, Neil Diamond, R.E.M. and Billy Joel.

== Government ==
Matters such as social events, footpaths and sports facilities are governed by the (civil) parish council. Much greater expenditure is managed by the local Borough and Hampshire County Councils. The civil parish council has 14 seats across three wards: West End North, West End South and Kanes Hill.

== Culture and community ==
Until 2020, the annual West End Carnival took place each June, although it did not run in 2009 or 2010 due to a lack of volunteers. It has not taken place since as the carnival committee was disbanded, however the local council has considered a revival in 2026. The parish has an active local history society which runs a museum in the old fire station in the village centre.

== Education ==
There is one primary school in the village of West End, St. James School. Its predecessor is on the High Street built in 1901 which for a time during the late 20th century became St James's Pre-School.

== Notable people ==
Forester and environmental activist Richard St. Barbe Baker was born in West End.

=== Titanic connection ===
==== Arthur Rostron ====
Arthur Henry Rostron is buried in West End's Old Burial Ground. As captain of the Carpathia he was famous for rescuing 706 of her passengers and crew when RMS Titanic sank on 15 April 1912 and was awarded many honours, including being created a Knight Commander of the Order of the British Empire (KBE), as well as being awarded a Congressional Gold Medal. In the latter part of his life, he decided to spend his retirement in West End, where he stayed until he died in 1940.

==== James Jukes ====
Henry James Jukes was born and brought up in West End. He lived in Camlens House, Moorgreen Road, West End. James' parents, Joseph and Elizabeth Jukes, ran a garden holding and James was soon to be married. James was on board the Titanic as a part of the engineering department, or as it was better known, the 'black crew', but, aged 35 years, went down with the ship. In his honour a housing development on Moorgreen Road was named 'Jukes Walk' in 2002.

There are plaques in the West End Museum for both Rostron and Jukes.

== See also ==
- List of places of worship in the Borough of Eastleigh
