= Mansbridge =

Suburb of Southampton, England

Coordinates: 50.9372°N 1.3645°W

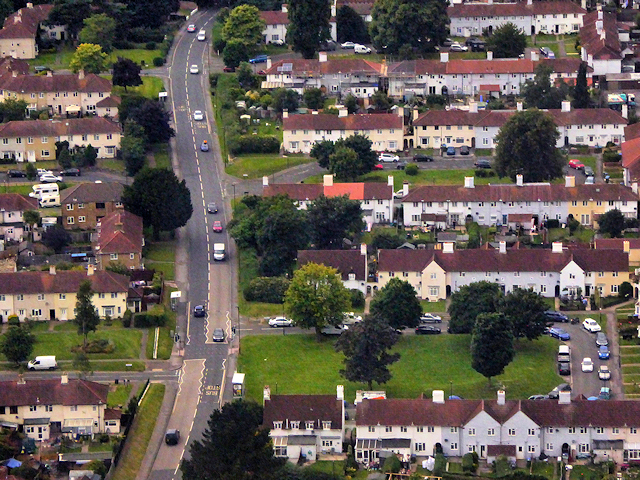
- Housing in Mansbridge, 2016

- Location within Southampton
- Unitary authority: Southampton
- Ceremonial county: Hampshire
- Region: South East
- Country: England
- Sovereign state: United Kingdom
- Post town: SOUTHAMPTON
- Postcode district: SO18
- Dialling code: 023
- Police: Hampshire and Isle of Wight
- Fire: Hampshire and Isle of Wight
- Ambulance: South Central
- UK Parliament: Southampton Itchen

Mansbridge is a suburb on the northern perimeter of Southampton, England. The area is named after the Mans Bridge which spans the River Itchen. For a considerable time, this was the southernmost crossing point of the river, before the construction of Woodmill in Swaythling. The bridge itself still stands and is a Grade II listed structure but is closed to road traffic (pedestrians and cyclists may still use it), having been replaced by a larger and more modern road bridge to carry the A27.

The suburb contains a mixture of housing. The first developments, on the north side of the A27, were designed by architect Herbert Collins, whose houses are a feature of several other Southampton districts. A larger estate was later constructed on the south side, along with Mansbridge Primary School, the logo of which is the bridge itself. The residential area of Mansbridge is bordered to the west by the London to Weymouth railway line and to the east by the river. Beyond the river, Mansbridge takes on a much more rural air, with woodland to the south and water meadows to the north.

The neighbouring areas are Swaythling to the west, Townhill Park to the south, and Chartwell Green to the east. A strip of green belt land separates Mansbridge from Eastleigh to the north.

== History ==
=== The bridges ===
There has been a bridge at Mansbridge since at least the year 932, when it was referred to as Mannysbrigge in King Athelstan's charter to the prior of St. Swithun's Priory in Winchester. In the Domesday Book of 1086, the location was recorded as Manebrige or Manesbrige Hundred, within the county of Hantscire. A wooden bridge by the name of Blak Bridge was described as being "a little above Woodmill" (i.e. upstream of Woodmill in Swaythling) by Leland in 1535–43, and this may be a reference to Mansbridge as there are no known crossing points of the river between Mansbridge and Woodmill. Saxton's map of 1575 shows the bridge at Mansbridge labelled as "mans bridge", while Speed's 1611 map refers to the hundred as Mansbridg. Blaeu's 1645 map shows Mansbridge Hundred but Morden's map of 1695 labels the bridge "Mansbridg", and shows it within the Fawley or Waltham (possibly Bishop's Waltham) Hundred.

The bridges that stand at Mansbridge today are much more recent than those mentioned above; the older of the two was built in 1816 by the county council; this bridge was made of stone with a single segmental arch and decorated with a lambswool pattern. The 1816 bridge is a grade II listed building, having first been listed on 14 July 1953. It is closed to motorised traffic and forms part of National Cycle Route 23.

The current bridge carrying the A27 road was constructed in 1975, and replaced a bailey bridge erected during the Second World War.

=== The Grange ===
The suburb of Mansbridge had at its heart, for a century, a large house called "The Grange." The Grange had an extensive ornamental garden, containing a diverse collection of trees. After World War II the house fell into disrepair, and was eventually demolished around 1970. The grounds are now a part of the Monks Brook Greenway, a nature trail, and many of the original trees can still be seen along the brook's bank.

=== Southampton water supply ===
Under the powers of the Southampton Waterworks Amendment Act 1850 a pumping station was set up at Mansbridge to take water from the River Itchen and transfer it to a pair of reservoirs on Southampton Common. The pumping station ceased being used in 1892.

== Gallery ==
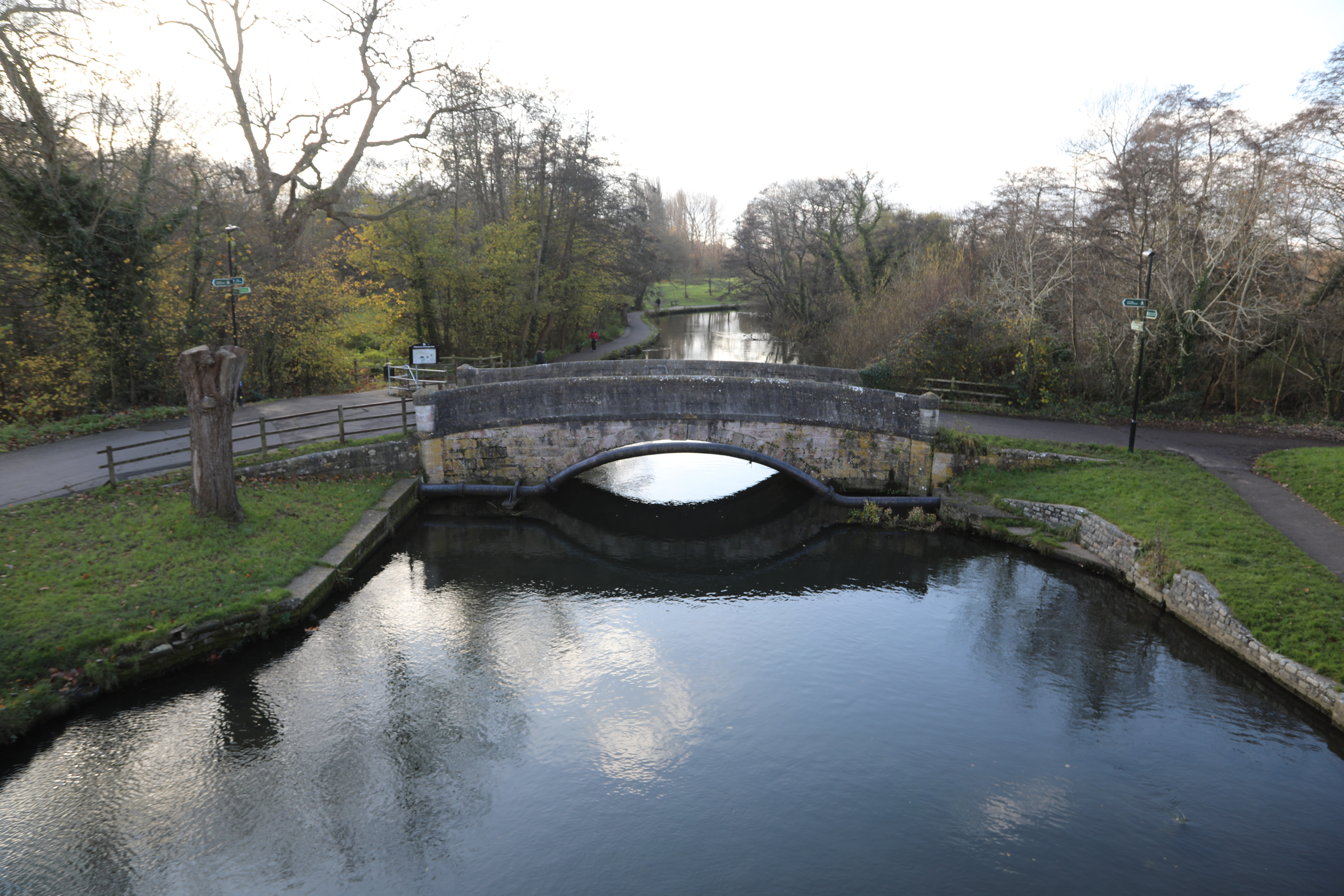
The bridge after which the suburb is named

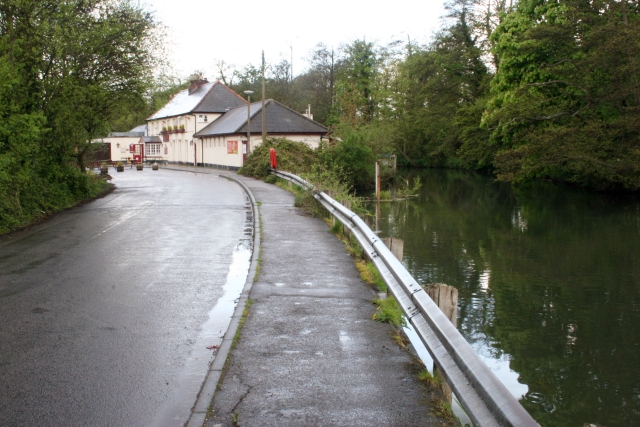
The White Swan public house in Mansbridge

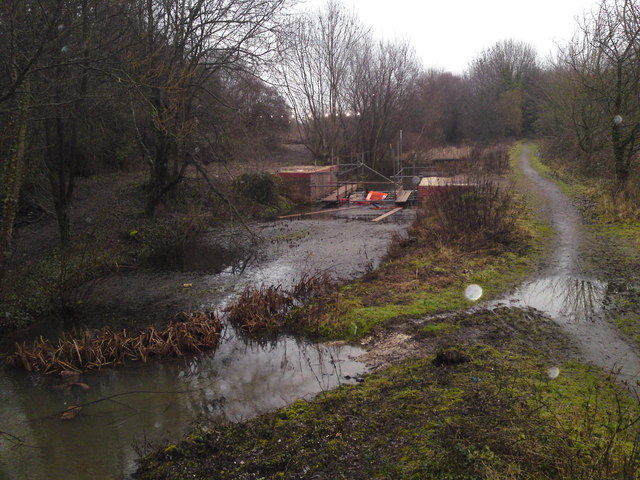
Lock conservation work in progress at Mansbridge Lock on the Itchen Navigation
