= List of acts of the Parliament of Great Britain from 1798 =

This is a complete list of acts of the Parliament of Great Britain for the year 1798.

For acts passed until 1707, see the list of acts of the Parliament of England and the list of acts of the Parliament of Scotland. See also the list of acts of the Parliament of Ireland.

For acts passed from 1801 onwards, see the list of acts of the Parliament of the United Kingdom. For acts of the devolved parliaments and assemblies in the United Kingdom, see the list of acts of the Scottish Parliament, the list of acts of the Northern Ireland Assembly, and the list of acts and measures of Senedd Cymru; see also the list of acts of the Parliament of Northern Ireland.

The number shown after each act's title is its chapter number. Acts are cited using this number, preceded by the year(s) of the reign during which the relevant parliamentary session was held; thus the Union with Ireland Act 1800 is cited as "39 & 40 Geo. 3. c. 67", meaning the 67th act passed during the session that started in the 39th year of the reign of George III and which finished in the 40th year of that reign. Note that the modern convention is to use Arabic numerals in citations (thus "41 Geo. 3" rather than "41 Geo. III"). Acts of the last session of the Parliament of Great Britain and the first session of the Parliament of the United Kingdom are both cited as "41 Geo. 3".

Acts passed by the Parliament of Great Britain did not have a short title; however, some of these acts have subsequently been given a short title by acts of the Parliament of the United Kingdom (such as the Short Titles Act 1896).

From the session 38 Geo. 3 onwards, "public acts" were separated into "public general acts" and "public local and personal acts".

== 38 Geo. 3 ==
Continuing the second session of the 18th Parliament of Great Britain, which met from 2 November 1797 until 29 June 1798. This session was also traditionally cited as 38 G. 3.

=== Public general acts ===
Short title	Citation	Royal assent
Long title
Taxation Act 1798 (repealed)	38 Geo. 3. c. 16	12 January 1798
An act for granting to his Majesty an aid and contribution for the prosecution of the war. (Repealed by Statute Law Revision Act 1861 (24 & 25 Vict. c. 101))
Militia Act 1798 (repealed)	38 Geo. 3. c. 17	12 January 1798
An act for allowing, during the continuance of the present war, a certain proportion of the men raised in pursuance of two acts of the last session of parliament (Note: Militia Act 1796 (37 Geo. 3. c. 3)) (Note: Militia (No. 2) Act 1796 (37 Geo. 3. c. 22)) for augmenting the militia, to enlist into his Majesty's other forces, and to serve until six months after the conclusion of a general peace. (Repealed by Statute Law Revision Act 1871 (34 & 35 Vict. c. 116))
Supplementary Militia Act 1798 (repealed)	38 Geo. 3. c. 18	20 February 1798
An act to enable his Majesty to order out a certain proportion of the supplementary militia and to provide for the necessary augmentation of men in the several companies of militia, by incorporating the supplementary militia therewith. (Repealed by Militia Act 1802 (42 Geo. 3. c. 90))
Supplementary Militia (No. 2) Act 1798 (repealed)	38 Geo. 3. c. 19	23 February 1798
An act to give further time for putting in execution an act, made in this present session of parliament, intituled, "An act to enable his Majesty to order out a certain proportion of the supplementary militia, and to provide for the necessary augmentation of men in the several companies of militia, by incorporating the supplementary militia therewith." (Note: Supplementary Militia Act 1798 (38 Geo. 3. c. 18)) (Repealed by Statute Law Revision Act 1871 (34 & 35 Vict. c. 116))
Loans or Exchequer Bills Act 1798 (repealed)	38 Geo. 3. c. 20	9 March 1798
An act for raising a further sum of money, by loans or exchequer bills, for the service of the year 1798. (Repealed by Statute Law Revision Act 1871 (34 & 35 Vict. c. 116))
Annuity to Lord Saint Vincent Act 1798 (repealed)	38 Geo. 3. c. 21	9 March 1798
An act for settling and securing a certain annuity on John earl St. Vincent, and the two next persons to whom the title of earl St. Vincent shall descend, in consideration of the eminent service performed by the said John earl St. Vincent to his Majesty and the publick. (Repealed by Statute Law Revision Act 1871 (34 & 35 Vict. c. 116) and Statute Law Revision Act 1948 (11 & 12 Geo. 6. c. 62))
Annuity to Lord Camperdown Act 1798 (repealed)	38 Geo. 3. c. 22	9 March 1798
An act for settling and securing a certain annuity on Adam lord viscount Duncan, and the two next persons to whom the title of viscount Duncan shall descend, in consideration of the eminent service performed by the said Adam lord viscount Duncan to his Majesty and the publick. (Repealed by Statute Law Revision Act 1871 (34 & 35 Vict. c. 116))
Mutiny Act 1798 (repealed)	38 Geo. 3. c. 23	9 March 1798
An act for punishing mutiny and desertion; and for the better payment of the army and their quarters. (Repealed by Statute Law Revision Act 1871 (34 & 35 Vict. c. 116))
Duties on Plate Act 1798 (repealed)	38 Geo. 3. c. 24	9 March 1798
An act to repeal the duties on gold and silver plate used in watch cases. (Repealed by Statute Law Revision Act 1871 (34 & 35 Vict. c. 116))
Importation Act 1798 (repealed)	38 Geo. 3. c. 25	9 March 1798
An act to permit, during the continuance of the present war, the importation of salt from Portugal, in neutral ships. (Repealed by Statute Law Revision Act 1871 (34 & 35 Vict. c. 116))
Land Tax Act 1798 (repealed)	38 Geo. 3. c. 26	9 March 1798
An act for rectifying mistakes in the names of several of the commissioners appointed by an act, made in the last session of parliament, (Note: Land Tax (No. 1) Act 1797 (37 Geo. 3. c. 35)) to put in execution an act, made in the same session, intituled, "An act for granting an aid to his Majesty by a land tax to be raised in Great Britain for the service of the year 1797;" (Note: Land Tax (No. 2) Act 1796 (37 Geo. 3. c. 2)) and for appointing other commissioners, together with those named in the first mentioned act, to put in execution an act of this session of parliament, (Note: Land Tax Act 1797 (38 Geo. 3. c. 5)) for granting an aid to his Majesty by a land tax, to be raised in Great Britain, for the service of the year 1798, and for indemnifying such persons as have acted as commissioners for executing the said act, for granting an aid to his Majesty by a land tax, to be raised in Great Britain, for the service of the year 1797. (Repealed by Statute Law Revision Act 1871 (34 & 35 Vict. c. 116))
Defence of the Realm Act 1798 (repealed)	38 Geo. 3. c. 27	5 April 1798
An Act to enable His Majesty more effectually to provide for the Defence and Security of the Realm during the present War, and for indemnifying Persons who may suffer in their Property by such Measures as may be necessary for that Purpose. (Repealed by Statute Law Revision Act 1871 (34 & 35 Vict. c. 116))
Debts Due to the United Provinces, etc. Act 1798 or the Correspondence with Enemies Act 1798 (repealed)	38 Geo. 3. c. 28	5 April 1798
An act to prevent, during the war, persons residing or being in Great Britain, from advancing money or effects for the purchase or on the credit of debts owing to the government of the United Provinces, or any bodies politick or corporate, or any persons within the said provinces, without licence for that purpose; and for extending the provisions of an act, made in the thirty-third year of the reign of his present Majesty, (Note: Correspondence with Enemies Act 1793 (33 Geo. 3. c. 27)) more effectually to prevent, during the present war between Great Britain and France, all traiterous correspondence with, or aid or assistance being given to his Majesty's enemies, to the said United Provinces, and to the persons exercising the powers of government therein, and also to the persons, territories, and places, under their government. (Repealed by Statute Law Revision Act 1871 (34 & 35 Vict. c. 116))
Exportation Act 1798 (repealed)	38 Geo. 3. c. 29	5 April 1798
An act to revive and continue, until the conclusion of the present war, an act passed in the session holden in the thirty-sixth and thirty-seventh years of his present Majesty, c. 125. (Note: Exportation Act 1797 (37 Geo. 3. c. 125)) viz. on July 19, 1797, for authorising his Majesty to permit the exportation of an additional quantity of wheat and other articles to the islands of Guernsey, Jersey, and Alderney. (Repealed by Statute Law Revision Act 1871 (34 & 35 Vict. c. 116))
Bounty on British Sail Cloth Exported Act 1798 (repealed)	38 Geo. 3. c. 30	5 April 1798
An act to continue, until March 25, 1799, an act passed in the session of parliament holden in the thirty-sixth and thirty-seventh years of his present Majesty, c. 76. (Note: Bounty on Exportation Act 1797 (37 Geo. 3. c. 76)) viz. on June 6, 1797, for disallowing the bounty on sail cloth or canvas, the manufacture of Great Britain, exported to Ireland. (Repealed by Statute Law Revision Act 1871 (34 & 35 Vict. c. 116))
Duties on Distilleries Act 1798 (repealed)	38 Geo. 3. c. 31	5 April 1798
An Act to revive and continue, until May 1, 1798, an act passed in the session of parliament holden in the thirty-sixth and thirty-seventh years of his present Majesty, c. 102. (Note: Scotch Distilleries Act 1797 (37 Geo. 3. c. 102)) viz. on July 18, 1797, for granting to his Majesty additional duties on distilleries, in the several parts of the highlands of Scotland, therein particularly described, for a limited time; and for regulating the duties on distilleries, in the respective districts in Scotland. (Repealed by Statute Law Revision Act 1871 (34 & 35 Vict. c. 116))
Quartering of Soldiers Act 1798 (repealed)	38 Geo. 3. c. 32	5 April 1798
An Act for encreasing the rates of subsistence to be paid to innkeepers and others on quartering soldiers. (Repealed by Statute Law Revision Act 1871 (34 & 35 Vict. c. 116))
Quarantine, etc. Act 1798 (repealed)	38 Geo. 3. c. 33	5 April 1798
An Act to amend two acts, made in the twenty-sixth year of King George the Second, (Note: Quarantine Act 1753 (26 Geo. 2. c. 6)) and the twenty-eighth year of the reign of his present Majesty, (Note: Quarantine and Customs Act 1788 (28 Geo. 3. c. 34)) respecting the performance of quarantine; for punishing persons acting contrary to any order in council, which may be made for laying any embargo on ships or vessels, or for prohibiting or regulating the exportation of any goods, wares, or merchandize; to prevent the fraudulent importation of glass into this kingdom; for permitting the removal of coffee and cocoa coastwise, for the greater convenience of exportation; to authorise the commissioners of the customs to return the duties paid on goods imported, which shall be lost or destroyed before the landing thereof; to prevent vessels licensed by the admiralty, from being engaged in any trade or employment not permitted by their licences; for permitting wines put on board any of his Majesty's ships, to be removed from one ship to another, without being first landed and warehoused; and for extending the provisions of an act, made in the thirty-third year of the reign of his present Majesty, (Note: Customs Act 1793 (33 Geo. 3. c. 48)) to wines delivered into the charge of the collector and comptroller of his Majesty's customs at the port of Falmouth. (Repealed by Customs Law Repeal Act 1825 (6 Geo. 4. c. 105))
Kent and Devon Fortifications Act 1798	38 Geo. 3. c. 34	5 April 1798
An act for making compensation to the proprietors of certain lands and hereditaments purchased in pursuance of an act, made in the thirty-fourth year of the reign of his present Majesty, (Note: Kent and Devon Fortifications Act 1794 (34 Geo. 3. c. 76)) for better securing his Majesty's batteries, and other works, in the counties of Kent and Devon; and to certain owners and occupiers of lands who have sustained any loss or damage in consequence of the said act.
Continuance of Laws Act 1798 (repealed)	38 Geo. 3. c. 35	5 April 1798
An act to continue several laws relating to the granting a bounty on certain species of British and Irish linens exported, and taking off the duties on the importation of foreign raw linen yarns made of flax, until June 24, 1799; to the permitting the exportation of tobacco pipe clay from this kingdom to the British sugar colonies or plantations in the West Indies, until June 24, 1802; to the allowing the importation of rape seed, and other seeds used for extracting oil, whenever the prices of middling British rape seed shall be above a certain limit, until June 24, 1799; to the further support and encouragement of the fisheries carried on in the Greenland seas and Davis's streights, until Dec. 25, 1799; to the more effectual encouragement of the manufactures of flax and cotton in Great Britain, until June 24, 1799; to the ascertaining the strength of spirits by Clarke's hydrometer, until June 1, 1801; and so much of an act, made in the thirty-fifth year of the reign of his present Majesty, (Note: Duties on Glass Act 1795 (35 Geo. 3. c. 114)) for better securing the duties on glass, as was to continue for a limited time, until July 5, 1799. (Repealed by Statute Law Revision Act 1871 (34 & 35 Vict. c. 116))
Habeas Corpus Suspension Act 1798 (repealed)	38 Geo. 3. c. 36	21 April 1798
An act to empower his Majesty to secure and detain such persons as his Majesty shall suspect are conspiring against his person and government. (Repealed by Statute Law Revision Act 1871 (34 & 35 Vict. c. 116))
National Debt Act 1798 (repealed)	38 Geo. 3. c. 37	7 May 1798
An act for raising the sum of seventeen millions by way of annuities. (Repealed by Statute Law Revision Act 1870 (33 & 34 Vict. c. 69))
Prize Causes Act 1798 (repealed)	38 Geo. 3. c. 38	7 May 1798
An act for declaring the validity of two orders in council, dated the sixth day of August one thousand seven hundred and ninety-four, and the thirtieth day of March one thousand seven hundred and ninety-eight; and for enlarging the time of appealing in prize causes; and for permitting appeals to be prosecuted after such time shall have elapsed, in such special causes as his Majesty, by any order in council, shall authorise. (Repealed by Naval Prize Acts Repeal Act 1864 (27 & 28 Vict. c. 23))
Importation and Exportation Act 1798 (repealed)	38 Geo. 3. c. 39	7 May 1798
An act to amend an act, passed in the twenty-seventh year of his present Majesty's reign, intituled, "An act for allowing the importation and exportation of certain goods, wares, and merchandize, in the ports of Kingston, Savannah la Mar, Montego Bay, and Santa Lucea, in the island of Jamaica, in the port of Saint George, in the island of Grenada, in the port of Roseau, in the inland of Dominica, and in the port of Nassau, in the island of New Providence, one of the Bahama Islands, under certain regulations and restrictions." (Note: Importation and Exportation Act 1787 (27 Geo. 3. c. 27)) (Repealed by Statute Law Revision Act 1861 (24 & 25 Vict. c. 101))
Inhabited House, etc., Duties Act 1798 (repealed)	38 Geo. 3. c. 40	10 May 1798
An act for repealing the duties on houses, windows, and lights, on inhabited houses, and on clocks and watches; and for granting to his Majesty other duties on houses, windows, and lights, and on inhabited houses, in lieu thereof. (Repealed by Statute Law Revision Act 1871 (34 & 35 Vict. c. 116))
Duties on Servants, etc. Act 1798 (repealed)	38 Geo. 3. c. 41	10 May 1798
An act for repealing the duties upon male servants, carriages, horses, mules, and dogs; and for granting to his Majesty other duties in lieu thereof. (Repealed by House Tax Act 1803 (43 Geo. 3. c. 161))
Excise Act 1798 (repealed)	38 Geo. 3. c. 42	10 May 1798
An act for granting to his Majesty an additional duty of excise upon tea; and for repealing so much of an act, made in the last session of parliament, (Note: Customs Act 1796 (37 Geo. 3. c. 15)) as charges a duty of five pounds per centum upon tea imported into or sold in Great Britain. (Repealed by Statute Law Revision Act 1861 (24 & 25 Vict. c. 101))
Duties on Salt Act 1798 (repealed)	38 Geo. 3. c. 43	10 May 1798
An act for granting to his Majesty additional duties on salt. (Repealed by Statute Law Revision Act 1861 (24 & 25 Vict. c. 101))
Militia (No. 2) Act 1798 (repealed)	38 Geo. 3. c. 44	10 May 1798
An act to enable his Majesty to call out a part of the militia in that part of Great Britain, called Scotland, and to amend an act, made in the last session of parliament, intituled, "An act to raise and embody a militia force in that part of the kingdom of Great Britain called Scotland." (Note: Militia Act 1797 (37 Geo. 3. c. 103)) (Repealed by Statute Law Revision Act 1871 (34 & 35 Vict. c. 116))
Debts Due to Swiss Government Act 1798 (repealed)	38 Geo. 3. c. 45	10 May 1798
An act to prevent, during the war, persons residing or being in Great Britain from advancing money or effects for the purchase or on the credit of debts owing to any of the governments in Switzerland, or any bodies politick or corporate, or any persons therein, without licence for that purpose; for extending the provisions of an act made in the thirty-third year of the reign of his present Majesty, (Note: Correspondence with Enemies Act 1793 (33 Geo. 3. c. 27)) more effectually to prevent during the present war (Note: War of the Second Coalition.) between Great Britain and France, all traiterous correspondence with, or aid or assistance being given to, his Majesty's enemies, to Switzerland; and also the provisions of an act, made in the thirty-fourth year of the reign of his present Majesty, (Note: Aid to Government of France Act 1794 (34 Geo. 3. c. 9)) for preventing money or effects in the hands of his Majesty's subjects, belonging to, or disposeable by, any persons resident in France, being applied to the use of the persons exercising the powers of government in France, and for preserving the property thereof for the benefit of the individual owners thereof, to the United Provinces, and to Switzerland, and to the persons exercising the powers of government therein, and also to the persons, territories, and places, under their government. (Repealed by Statute Law Revision Act 1861 (24 & 25 Vict. c. 101))
Manning of the Navy Act 1798 (repealed)	38 Geo. 3. c. 46	26 May 1798
An act for the more speedy and effectual manning of his Majesty's navy. (Repealed by Statute Law Revision Act 1871 (34 & 35 Vict. c. 116))
National Debt (No. 2) Act 1798 (repealed)	38 Geo. 3. c. 47	26 May 1798
An act for granting to his Majesty the sum of two hundred thousand pounds, to be issued and paid to the governor and company of the bank of England, to be by them placed to the account of the commissioners for the reduction of the national debt. (Repealed by Statute Law Revision Act 1861 (24 & 25 Vict. c. 101))
Land Tax Commissioners Act 1798 (repealed)	38 Geo. 3. c. 48	26 May 1798
An act to alter and amend so much of an act, passed in this present session of parliament, intituled, "An act for granting an aid to his Majesty by a land tax, to be raised in Great Britain, for the service of the year one thousand seven hundred and ninety-eight," as relates to the qualification of commissioners. (Repealed by Finance Act 1963 (c. 25))
Rochdale Canal Act 1798	38 Geo. 3. c. 49	26 May 1798
An act for vesting divers lands and hereditaments in the parish of Halifax, in the county of York, in trustees and their heirs, upon certain trusts therein mentioned, discharged from all claims of the crown in respect of any forfeiture incurred under or by virtue of the statutes of mortmain, or the laws relating to mortmain.
Aliens Act 1798 (repealed)	38 Geo. 3. c. 50	1 June 1798
An act to continue, until the first day of August one thousand eight hundred, and until the end of the then next session of parliament, and amend an act, made in the thirty-third year of the reign of his present Majesty, intituled, "An act for establishing regulations respecting aliens arriving in this kingdom, or resident therein, in certain cases." (Note: Aliens Act 1793 (33 Geo. 3. c. 4)) (Repealed by Statute Law Revision Act 1861 (24 & 25 Vict. c. 101))
Yeomanry Cavalry Act 1798 (repealed)	38 Geo. 3. c. 51	1 June 1798
An act for authorizing the billeting such troops of yeomanry cavalry as be desirous of assembling for the purpose of being trained together, and for exempting from the payment of certain duties persons providing horses for the said yeomanry cavalry. (Repealed by Statute Law Revision Act 1871 (34 & 35 Vict. c. 116))
Counties of Cities Act 1798 (repealed)	38 Geo. 3. c. 52	1 June 1798
An act to regulate the trial of causes indictments and other proceedings which arise within the counties of certain cities and towns corporate within this kingdom. (Repealed by Courts Act 1971 (c. 23))
Armorial Bearings Act 1798 (repealed)	38 Geo. 3. c. 53	21 June 1798
An act for granting to his Majesty a duty on certificates issued with respect to armorial bearings or ensigns. (Repealed by Statute Law Revision Act 1861 (24 & 25 Vict. c. 101))
Excise (No. 2) Act 1798 (repealed)	38 Geo. 3. c. 54	21 June 1798
An act to amend several laws of excise relating to coachmakers, auctioneers, beer and cyder exported, certificates and debentures, stamps on hides and skins, drawbacks on wines and sweets, and ale and beer licences. (Repealed by Statute Law Revision Act 1861 (24 & 25 Vict. c. 101))
Militia (No. 3) Act 1798 (repealed)	38 Geo. 3. c. 55	21 June 1798
An act for augmenting the number of field officers and other officers of militia; and for making other provisions concerning the militia forces of this kingdom. (Repealed by Militia Act 1802 (42 Geo. 3. c. 90))
Stamps Act 1798 (repealed)	38 Geo. 3. c. 56	21 June 1798
An act for repealing so much of an act, made in the last session of parliament, intituled, "An act for granting to his Majesty certain stamp duties on the several matters therein mentioned; and for better securing the duties on certificates to be taken out by solicitors, attornies, and others practising in certain courts of justice in Great Britain;" (Note: Stamps (No. 2) Act 1797 (37 Geo. 3. c. 90)) as imposes a duty on licences granted to stipendiary curates to perform the office of curate in any church or chapel. (Repealed by Inland Revenue Repeal Act 1870 (33 & 34 Vict. c. 99))
Southern Whale Fisheries Act 1798 (repealed)	38 Geo. 3. c. 57	21 June 1798
An act for the further encouraging the southern whale fisheries. (Repealed by Customs Law Repeal Act 1825 (6 Geo. 4. c. 105))
British Fisheries Act 1798 (repealed)	38 Geo. 3. c. 58	21 June 1798
An act to continue until March 1, 1799, an act, made in the thirty-fifth year of the reign of his present Majesty, (Note: British Fisheries Act 1795 (35 Geo. 3. c. 56)) intituled, "An act to continue and amend an act made in the twenty-sixth year of the reign of his present Majesty, (Note: Fisheries (No. 2) Act 1786 (26 Geo. 3. c. 81)) intituled, 'An act for the more effectual encouragement of the British fisheries.'" (Repealed by Sea Fisheries Act 1868 (31 & 32 Vict. c. 45))
Silver Coin Act 1798 (repealed)	38 Geo. 3. c. 59	21 June 1798
An act to revive and continue, until the first day of January one thousand seven hundred and ninety-nine, an act passed in the fourteenth year of the reign of his present Majesty, chapter forty-two, videlicet, on the thirteenth day of January one thousand seven hundred and seventy-four, intituled, "An act to prohibit the importation of light silver coin, of this realm, from foreign countries into Great Britain or Ireland; and to restrain the tender thereof beyond a certain sum;" (Note: Light Silver Coin Act 1774 (14 Geo. 3. c. 42)) and to suspend the coining of silver. (Repealed by Statute Law Revision Act 1871 (34 & 35 Vict. c. 116))
Land Tax Perpetuation Act 1798 or the Redemption of Land Tax Act 1798 (repealed)	38 Geo. 3. c. 60	21 June 1798
An Act for making perpetual, subject to Redemption and Purchase in the Manner therein stated, the several Sums of Money now charged in Great Britain as a Land Tax for One Tear from the Twenty-fifth day of March One thousand seven hundred and ninety-eight. (Repealed by Finance Act 1949 (12, 13 & 14 Geo. 6. c. 47))
Drawbacks, etc. Act 1798 (repealed)	38 Geo. 3. c. 61	21 June 1798
An act to continue, until the end of the next session of parliament, and amend an act, passed in the thirty-sixth year of the reign of his present Majesty, chapter one hundred and six, (Note: Drawback Act 1796 (36 Geo. 3. c. 106)) videlicet, on the eighteenth day of May one thousand seven hundred and ninety-six, for regulating the allowance of the drawbacks and payment of the bounty on the exportation of sugar. (Repealed by Statute Law Revision Act 1871 (34 & 35 Vict. c. 116))
Assize of Bread Act 1798 (repealed)	38 Geo. 3. c. 62	21 June 1798
An act to empower magistrates and justices of the peace, in setting the assize of bread, to make an allowance on account of the additional duty on salt. (Repealed by Statute Law Revision Act 1861 (24 & 25 Vict. c. 101))
Isle of Man Trade Act 1798 (repealed)	38 Geo. 3. c. 63	21 June 1798
An act for the further encouragement of the trade and manufactures of The Isle of Man; for improving the revenue thereof; and for the more effectual prevention of smuggling to and from the said island. (Repealed by Statute Law Revision Act 1871 (34 & 35 Vict. c. 116))
Militia Pay Act 1798 (repealed)	38 Geo. 3. c. 64	21 June 1798
An act for defraying the charge of the pay and cloathing of the militia in that part of Great Britain called England, for one year from the twenty-fifth day of March one thousand seven hundred and ninety-eight. (Repealed by Statute Law Revision Act 1871 (34 & 35 Vict. c. 116))
Diseased Sheep, etc. Act 1798 (repealed)	38 Geo. 3. c. 65	21 June 1798
An act for preventing the depasturing of forests, commons, and open fields, with sheep or lambs infected with the scab or mange, in that part of Great Britain called England. (Repealed by Contagious Diseases (Animals) Act 1869 (32 & 33 Vict. c. 70))
Militia (No. 4) Act 1798 (repealed)	38 Geo. 3. c. 66	21 June 1798
An act for empowering his Majesty, for a time and to an extent to be limited, to accept the services of such parts of his militia forces in this kingdom as may voluntarily offer themselves to be employed in Ireland. (Repealed by Statute Law Revision Act 1871 (34 & 35 Vict. c. 116))
Exportation (No. 2) Act 1798 (repealed)	38 Geo. 3. c. 67	21 June 1798
An act to prevent the exportation of base coin to his Majesty's colonies in the West Indies and America. (Repealed by Customs Law Repeal Act 1825 (6 Geo. 4. c. 105))
Duties on Cinnamon, etc. Act 1798 (repealed)	38 Geo. 3. c. 68	21 June 1798
An act for regulating the payment, until two months after the commencement of the next session of parliament after the end of the present war, of the duties on cinnamon, cloves, nutmegs, and mace, and for granting to his Majesty additional duties thereon. (Repealed by Statute Law Revision Act 1871 (34 & 35 Vict. c. 116))
Gold Plate (Standard) Act 1798 (repealed)	38 Geo. 3. c. 69	21 June 1798
An act for allowing gold wares to be manufactured at a standard lower than is now allowed by law. (Repealed by Hallmarking Act 1973 (c. 43))
Militia Allowances Act 1798 (repealed)	38 Geo. 3. c. 70	21 June 1798
An act for making allowances in certain cases to subaltern officers of the militia in time of peace. (Repealed by Statute Law Revision Act 1871 (34 & 35 Vict. c. 116))
Copyright Act 1798 (repealed)	38 Geo. 3. c. 71	21 June 1798
An act for encouraging the art of making new models and casts of busts and other things therein mentioned. (Repealed by Statute Law Revision Act 1861 (24 & 25 Vict. c. 101))
Indemnity to Governors of West Indies Act 1798 (repealed)	38 Geo. 3. c. 72	21 June 1798
An act for indemnifying governors, lieutenant governors, and persons acting as such, in the Weft India islands, who have permitted the importation and exportation of goods and commodities in foreign bottoms. (Repealed by Statute Law Revision Act 1871 (34 & 35 Vict. c. 116))
Packing, etc., of Butter Act 1798 (repealed)	38 Geo. 3. c. 73	21 June 1798
An act for amending and rendering more effectual an act, made in the thirty-sixth year of the reign of his present Majesty, intituled, "An act to prevent abuses and frauds in the packing, weight, and sale of butter; and to repeal certain acts relating thereto." (Note: Sale of Butter Act 1796 (36 Geo. 3. c. 86)) (Repealed by Butter and Cheese Trade Act 1844 (7 & 8 Vict. c. 48))
Regiment of Cornwall and Devon Miners Act 1798 (repealed)	38 Geo. 3. c. 74	21 June 1798
An act for raising a body of miners in the counties of Cornwall and Devon, for the defence of the kingdom, during the present war. (Repealed by Militia (Stannaries) Act 1802 (42 Geo. 3. c. 72))
Lottery Act 1798 (repealed)	38 Geo. 3. c. 75	21 June 1798
An act for granting to his Majesty a certain sum of money, to be raised by a lottery. (Repealed by Statute Law Revision Act 1871 (34 & 35 Vict. c. 116))
Customs, etc. Act 1798 (repealed)	38 Geo. 3. c. 76	28 June 1798
An all for the better protection of the trade of this kingdom; and for granting new and additional duties of customs on goods imported and exported, and on the tonnage of certain ships entering outwards or inwards to or from foreign parts, until the signing the preliminary articles of peace. (Repealed by Statute Law Revision Act 1871 (34 & 35 Vict. c. 116))
Aliens (No. 2) Act 1798 (repealed)	38 Geo. 3. c. 77	28 June 1798
An act to amend an act of the present session of parliament (Note: Aliens Act 1798 (38 Geo. 3. c. 50)) intituled, "An act to continue until the first day of August one thousand eight hundred, and until the end of the then next session of parliament, and amend an act made in the thirty-third year of the reign of his present Majesty, intituled, 'An act for establishing regulations respecting aliens arriving in this kingdom or resident therein, in certain cases.'" (Repealed by Statute Law Revision Act 1871 (34 & 35 Vict. c. 116))
Newspaper Publication Act 1798 (repealed)	38 Geo. 3. c. 78	28 June 1798
An act for preventing the mischiefs arising from the printing and publishing newspapers, and papers of a like nature, by persons not known; and for regulating the printing and publication of such papers in other respects. (Repealed by Stamp Duties on Newspapers Act 1836 (6 & 7 Will. 4. c. 76))
Residence in France During the War Act 1798 (repealed)	38 Geo. 3. c. 79	28 June 1798
An act more effectually to prevent during the war persons, being his Majesty's subjects, from voluntarily repairing to or remaining in France, or any country or place united to France, or occupied by the armies of France; and to prevent correspondence with such persons, and with his Majesty's enemies. (Repealed by Statute Law Revision Act 1871 (34 & 35 Vict. c. 116))
Duties on Servants Act 1798 (repealed)	38 Geo. 3. c. 80	28 June 1798
An act to explain and amend an act of the present session of parliament, intituled, "An act for repealing the duties upon male servants, carriages, horses, mules, and dogs; and for granting to his Majesty other duties in lieu thereof." (Note: Duties on Servants, etc. Act 1798 (38 Geo. 3. c. 41)) (Repealed by House Tax Act 1803 (43 Geo. 3. c. 161))
Taxation (No. 2) Act 1798 (repealed)	38 Geo. 3. c. 81	28 June 1798
An act for the better execution of an act of the present session of parliament, intituled, "An act for granting to his Majesty an aid and contribution for the prosecution of the war." (Note: Taxation Act 1798 (38 Geo. 3. c. 16)) (Repealed by Statute Law Revision Act 1861 (24 & 25 Vict. c. 101))
Loans or Exchequer Bills (No. 2) Act 1798 (repealed)	38 Geo. 3. c. 82	28 June 1798
An act for raising an additional sum of money, by loans or exchequer bills, for the service of the year 1798. (Repealed by Statute Law Revision Act 1871 (34 & 35 Vict. c. 116))
Loans or Exchequer Bills (No. 3) Act 1798 (repealed)	38 Geo. 3. c. 83	28 June 1798
An act to authorise exchequer bills to be issued on the credit of the loan granted by an act, made in this present session of parliament, intituled, "An act for raising the sum of seventeen millions by way of annuities." (Note: National Debt Act 1798 (38 Geo. 3. c. 37)) (Repealed by Statute Law Revision Act 1871 (34 & 35 Vict. c. 116))
Loans or Exchequer Bills (No. 4) Act 1798 (repealed)	38 Geo. 3. c. 84	28 June 1798
An act to enable the lords commissioners of his Majesty's treasury to issue exchequer bills, to a limited amount, on the credit of such monies as shall arise by virtue of an act of this session, for granting an aid and contribution for the prosecution of the war; and also on such rates and duties as may be granted by any act of this session for the better protection of the trade of this kingdom; and for granting new and additional duties of customs on goods imported and exported, and on the tonnage of ships entering outwards or inwards. (Repealed by Statute Law Revision Act 1871 (34 & 35 Vict. c. 116))
Stamps (No. 2) Act 1798 (repealed)	38 Geo. 3. c. 85	28 June 1798
An act for explaining and amending certain acts relating to the stamp duties; and for extending the rates and duties of stamps, now payable on vellum, parchment, and paper, to all other materials. (Repealed by Inland Revenue Repeal Act 1870 (33 & 34 Vict. c. 99))
Customs Act 1798 (repealed)	38 Geo. 3. c. 86	28 June 1798
An act for abolishing certain offices in the customs, and for regulating certain other offices therein; and for applying the fees which have been received from vacant offices towards the augmentation of the superannuation fund. (Repealed by Customs Law Repeal Act 1825 (6 Geo. 4. c. 105))
Administration of Estates Act 1798 (repealed)	38 Geo. 3. c. 87	28 June 1798
An act for the administration of assets in cases where the executor to whom probate has been granted is out of the realm. (Repealed for England and Wales by Administration of Estates Act 1925 (15 & 16 Geo. 5. c. 23) and for Northern Ireland by Administration of Estates Act (Northern Ireland) 1955 (1955 c. 24 (N.I.)))
Slave Trade Act 1798 (repealed)	38 Geo. 3. c. 88	28 June 1798
An act for regulating until the first day of August one thousand seven hundred and ninety-nine, the shipping and carrying of slaves in British vessels from the coast of Africa. (Repealed by Statute Law Revision Act 1871 (34 & 35 Vict. c. 116))
Salt Duties Act 1798 (repealed)	38 Geo. 3. c. 89	28 June 1798
An act for transferring the management of the salt duties to the commissioners of excise; and for repealing the duties on salt, and the drawbacks, allowances, and bounties paid thereout, and for granting other duties, drawbacks, allowances, and bounties thereon. (Repealed by Statute Law Revision Act 1861 (24 & 25 Vict. c. 101))
Appropriation Act 1798 (repealed)	38 Geo. 3. c. 90	29 June 1798
An act for enabling his Majesty to raise the sum of one million for the uses and purposes therein mentioned, and for applying a certain sum of money therein mentioned for the service of the year one thousand seven hundred and ninety-eight; for further appropriating the supplies granted in this session of parliament; and for making forth duplicates of exchequer bills, lottery tickets, certificates, receipts, annuity orders, or other orders, lost, burnt, or otherwise destroyed. (Repealed by Statute Law Revision Act 1871 (34 & 35 Vict. c. 116))
Exchequer Bills Act 1798 (repealed)	38 Geo. 3. c. 91	29 June 1798
An act for raising the sum of three millions by loans or exchequer bills. (Repealed by Statute Law Revision Act 1871 (34 & 35 Vict. c. 116))
Scotch Distilleries Act 1798 (repealed)	38 Geo. 3. c. 92	29 June 1798
An act to revive, continue until the tenth day of April one thousand seven hundred and ninety-nine, and amend an act passed in the last session of parliament, intituled, "An act for granting to his Majesty additional duties on distilleries in the several parts of the highlands of Scotland therein particularly described for a limited time, and for regulating the duties on distilleries in the respective districts in Scotland"; (Note: Scotch Distilleries Act 1797 (37 Geo. 3. c. 102)) and for granting to his Majesty certain additional duties on spirits distilled for consumption, and a duty on unmalted grain used in distillation, in Scotland; and for altering and amending certain other acts of parliament for the regulation of distilleries in Scotland. (Repealed by Statute Law Revision Act 1861 (24 & 25 Vict. c. 101))
Duty on Taxed Carts Act 1798 (repealed)	38 Geo. 3. c. 93	29 June 1798
An act for ascertaining the duty payable on taxed carts. (Repealed by House Tax Act 1803 (43 Geo. 3. c. 161))
Provisional Cavalry Act 1798 (repealed)	38 Geo. 3. c. 94	29 June 1798
An act for the regulation of the provisional force of cavalry, raised by virtue of two acts of the last session of parliament. (Note: Provisional Cavalry Act 1796 (37 Geo. 3. c. 6)) (Note: Provisional Cavalry (No. 2) Act 1796 (37 Geo. 3. c. 23)) (Repealed by Statute Law Revision Act 1871 (34 & 35 Vict. c. 116))

=== Local acts ===
Short title	Citation	Royal assent
Long title
Tadcaster and Halton Dial Road Act 1798 (repealed)	38 Geo. 3. c. ii	12 January 1798
An act for continuing, for twenty-one years, and from thence to the end of the then next session of parliament, the term, and altering and enlarging the powers, of two several acts one passed in the twenty-fourth year of the reign of his late majesty King George the Second, (Note: Tadcaster, etc., Roads Act 1750 (24 Geo. 2. c. 22)) and the other in the sixteenth year of his present Majesty, (Note: Tadcaster to Halton Dial Road Act 1776 (16 Geo. 3. c. 82)) so far as the same relate to repairing the road from Tadcaster to Halton Dyal, in the west riding of the county of York. (Repealed by Tadcaster and Halton Dial Road Act 1819 (59 Geo. 3. c. xciv))
Macklin's Lottery Act 1798 (repealed)	38 Geo. 3. c. iii	23 February 1798
An act for extending the time limited for determining a lottery, established under the authority of an act, passed in the thirty-seventh year of his present Majesty's reign, intituled, "An act for enabling Thomas Macklin to dispose of his collection of modern paintings, as now exhibited at his gallery in Fleet Street, by way of chance." (Note: Thomas Macklin's Paintings Act 1797 (37 Geo. 3. c. 133)) (Repealed by Statute Law (Repeals) Act 2013 (c. 2))
Leeds and Ripon Roads Act 1798	38 Geo. 3. c. iv	9 March 1798
An act for continuing for twenty-one years, and from thence to the end of the then next session of parliament, the term, and altering and enlarging the powers, of two several acts, the one made and passed in the twenty-fifth year of the reign of his late majesty King George the Second, (Note: Yorkshire Roads (No. 3) Act 1751 (25 Geo. 2. c. 58)) and the other in the seventeenth year of the reign of his present Majesty, (Note: Yorks Roads (No. 2) Act 1777 (17 Geo. 3. c. 77)) for repairing the roads from the town of Leeds, through Harewood, to the south-west corner of the inclosures of Harrogate, and from thence in two branches (one through Ripley over Burage Green, and the other through Knaresbrough and Boroughbridge) to Ripon, and from thence to the first rill of water or watercourse on Hutton Moor, in the county of York; and for repairing the sloughs or ruts on the said moor, so far as the same relate to the road leading from the south-west corner of the inclosures of Harrogate (through Knaresbrough) to Boroughbridge.
Somersham Road (Huntingdonshire) Act 1798 (repealed)	38 Geo. 3. c. v	9 March 1798
An act for continuing for the term of twenty-one years, and from thence to the end of the then next session of parliament, the term, and altering and enlarging the powers of an act, passed in the fifth year of the reign of his present Majesty, (Note: Huntingdon Roads Act 1765 (5 Geo. 3. c. 53)) for repairing the road from Chatteris Ferry to Hammond's Eau and Somersham Bridge; and for amending and widening the road from Somersham Bridge to the sheep market in Saint Ives; and also the road branching out of the said road near Stocks Bridge, through Needingworth, to Earith, in the county of Huntingdon. (Repealed by Somersham Road (Huntingdonshire) Act 1820 (1 Geo. 4. c. lxxix))
Penrith and Chalk Beck Road Act 1798	38 Geo. 3. c. vi	5 April 1798
An act for continuing, for twenty-one years, and from thence to the end of the then next session of parliament, the term, and amending the powers of two acts respectively made in the twenty-sixth year of the reign of his late majesty King George the Second, (Note: Cumberland Roads Act 1753 (26 Geo. 2. c. 37)) and in the eighteenth the year of the reign of his present Majesty, (Note: Cumberland Roads Act 1778 (18 Geo. 3. c. 108)) for repairing the road from Penrith to Chalk Beck, with a branch from the said road upon Castlesowerby pasture, to Caldbeck, all in the county of Cumberland.
Sussex Roads Act 1798 (repealed)	38 Geo. 3. c. vii	5 April 1798
An Act for continuing for the Term of twenty-one Years, and from thence to the End of the then next Session of Parliament, the Term, and altering and enlarging the Powers of an Act, passed in the seventeenth Year of the Reign of His present Majesty, (Note: Sussex Roads Act 1777 (17 Geo. 3. c. 74)) for repairing and widening the Road from a Place called Crouch Hill, in the Parish of Henfield, to the Turnpike Road leading from Brighthelmstone (Note: Brighthelmstone is now known as Brighton.) to Cuckfield, and from the East Side of the said Turnpike Road to the Town of Ditchling, in the County of Sussex, and also for repairing and widening the Road from Ubley's Farm, (Note: Ubley's Farm was located near the junction of the B2116 Albourne Road and the B2118 London Road, Albourne, East Sussex. 50°56′08″N 0°11′57″W) in the Parish of Hurstperpoint, to the Marle Pit opposite to Newtimber Broad Lane, in the said County. (Repealed by Roads from Henfield Act 1834 (4 & 5 Will. 4. c. x))
Wiltshire and Somerset Roads and Stokeford Bridge Act 1798 (repealed)	38 Geo. 3. c. viii	5 April 1798
An Act for more effectually repairing, widening, and improving the Road from Combe Bridge, through Winsley and Bradford to Staverton, and the Road from Bradford Bridge to Cockhill Gate, and the Road from the Bottom of Mason's Lane, near the Town of Bradford, all in the County of Wilts, to join the Turnpike Road leading from the City of Bath to Kingsdown, at or near Bathford Bridge, in the County of Somerset, and also several other Roads leading from or near the said Roads, in the said County of Wilts, and for maintaining a Bridge over the River Avon, at Stokeford, in the same County. (Repealed by Bradford Roads and Stokeford Bridge Act 1819 (59 Geo. 3. c. lxxxix))
Dumfriesshire Roads Act 1798 (repealed)	38 Geo. 3. c. ix	5 April 1798
An Act for repairing and widening several Roads in the County of Dumfries, to continue in force until the first Day of May one thousand eight hundred and nineteen, and from thence to the End of the then next Session of Parliament; and for converting the Statute Labour within the said County into Money; and applying the same towards repairing the Highways within the said County. (Repealed by Dumfriesshire Roads Act 1809 (49 Geo. 3. c. clx))
Cirencester Roads Act 1798 (repealed)	38 Geo. 3. c. x	5 April 1798
An Act for continuing for twenty one Years, and from thence to the End of the then next Session of Parliament, the Term, and enlarging the Powers, of two several Acts, passed in the twenty-fifth Year of the Reign of His late Majesty King George the Second, (Note: Gloucester Roads Act 1751 (25 Geo. 2. c. 13)) and in the nineteenth Year of the Reign of His present Majesty, (Note: Gloucester Roads (No. 2) Act 1779 (19 Geo. 3. c. 115)) for repairing the Road from the Town of Cirencester to the Town of Stroud, and that Part of Rodborough Hill which leads to Dudbridge; and also the Road leading from Cirencester towards Bisley, so far as the Bottom of Gulph Hill, all in the County of Gloucester. (Repealed by Cirencester Roads Act 1825 (6 Geo. 4. c. cxliii))
Lancashire Roads Act 1798	38 Geo. 3. c. xi	5 April 1798
An Act for more effectually repairing, widening, altering, and improving the Road from the Town of Manchester, by a Place called The White Smithy, (Note: The White Smithy was located at the junction of the A665 Bury Old Road and the A576 Middleton Road in Crumpsall. 53°30′57″N 2°14′58″W) in the Township of Crumpsall, to the Town of Rochdale; and also the Road from the said Place called The White Smithy, by a Place called Besses of the Barn, to the Town of Bury; and also the Road from the said Place called Besses of the Barn to Radcliffe Bridge; and also the Lane called Sheepfoot Lane, in the Township of Prestwich; all in the County Palatine of Lancaster.
Gloucester, Cheltenham and Tewkesbury Roads Act 1798 (repealed)	38 Geo. 3. c. xii	5 April 1798
An Act for enlarging for the Term of twenty-one Years, and from thence to the End of the then next Session of Parliament, the Term and Powers of an Act, made in the eighteenth Year of the Reign of His present Majesty, (Note: Gloucester Roads Act 1778 (18 Geo. 3. c. 102)) for repairing and widening the Roads leading from the City of Gloucester, towards Cheltenham and Tewkesbury, in the County of Gloucester. (Repealed by Statute Law (Repeals) Act 2013 (c. 2))
Crickley Hill, Campsfield and Kidlington Roads Act 1798 (repealed)	38 Geo. 3. c. xiii	5 April 1798
An Act for continuing for twenty-one Years, and from thence to the End of the then next Session of Parliament, the Term of two Acts, made in the twenty-fourth Year of the Reign of His late Majesty King George the Second, (Note: Gloucester and Oxford Road Act 1750 (24 Geo. 2. c. 28)) and in the eighth Year of the Reign of his present Majesty, (Note: Gloucester and Oxford Roads Act 1768 (8 Geo. 3. c. 41)) so far as the same relate to the Roads from the Top of Crickley Hill, in the County of Gloucester, to Frog Mill, through the Towns of Northleach, Burford, and Witney, and Parishes of Handborough and Bladen, to Campsfield in the Parish of Kidlington, in the County of Oxford; and also the Road from Campsfield, to the Turnpike Road at or near Enslow Bridge, in the said County of Oxford. (Repealed by Statute Law (Repeals) Act 2013 (c. 2))
Newhaven (Ouse) Bridge Act 1798	38 Geo. 3. c. xiv	5 April 1798
An Act to amend an Act, made in the twenty-fourth Year of the Reign of His present Majesty, (Note: Newhaven Bridge Act 1783 (24 Geo. 3. Sess. 1. c. 21)) for building a Bridge over the River Ouse, at Newhaven, in the County of Sussex.
Edinburgh Merchant Company Act 1798	38 Geo. 3. c. xv	5 April 1798
An act for enlarging the powers of the company of merchants of the city of Edinburgh.
Hythe (Kent) Improvement Act 1798 (repealed)	38 Geo. 3. c. xvi	5 April 1798
An act for paving, repairing, cleansing, lighting, and watching the highways, streets, and lanes, in the town and port of Hythe, and liberty thereof, in the county of Kent, and for removing and preventing nuisances and annoyances therein. (Repealed by Hythe Improvement and Waterworks Act 1874 (37 & 38 Vict. c. lxvi))
Plate Glass Company Act 1798 (repealed)	38 Geo. 3. c. xvii	7 May 1798
An act to incorporate certain persons therein named, and their successors, with proper powers, for the purpose of continuing a manufactory of plate glass, (Note: British Cast Plate Manufacturers Company.) originally established under an act passed in the thirteenth year of his present Majesty's reign, (Note: Plate Glass Manufacture Act 1772 (13 Geo. 3. c. 38)) which is now expired. (Repealed by Statute Law Revision Act 1953 (2 & 3 Eliz. 2. c. 5))
Kennet and Avon Canal Act 1798	38 Geo. 3. c. xviii	7 May 1798
An act to vary the line of the Kennet and Avon canal authorised to be made by two acts passed in the thirty-forth (Note: Kennet and Avon Canal Act 1794 (34 Geo. 3. c. 90)) and thirty-sixth (Note: Kennet and Avon Canal Act 1796 (36 Geo. 3. c. 44)) years of the reign of his present Majesty, and also to extend the powers of and to amend the said acts.
Leith Harbour Act 1798 (repealed)	38 Geo. 3. c. xix	7 May 1798
An Act to amend an Act, made in the twenty-eighth Year of the Reign of His present Majesty, (Note: Leith Harbour Act 1788 (28 Geo. 3. c. 58)) for Enlarging and Improving the Harbour of Leith. (Repealed by Leith Harbour and Docks Act 1875 (38 & 39 Vict. c. clx))
Glasgow Roads and Dalmarnock Bridge Act 1798 (repealed)	38 Geo. 3. c. xx	7 May 1798
An Act for continuing for twenty-one Years, and from thence to the End of the then next Session of Parliament, the Term, and altering the Powers of two Acts, passed in the twenty-ninth (Note: Ayr Roads Act 1789 (29 Geo. 3. c. 79)) and thirty-first (Note: Ayr Roads Act 1791 (31 Geo. 3. c. 95)) Years of His present Majesty's Reign, for Making and Repairing the Road from the City of Glasgow, by Muirkirk, to the Confines of the County of Ayr, and other Roads communicating therewith; and the Road from the Village of Gorbals, and New Bridge of Glasgow, by the Chapel of Cambuslang, till it joins the Road from Hamilton by Burnbank towards Eaglesham in the County of Renfrew; and for building a Bridge over the River Clyde at Dalmarnock or Farme Ford. (Repealed by Roads in Lanark, Ayr and Renfrew and Dalmarnock Bridge Act 1842 (5 & 6 Vict. c. cxii))
Dinwoodie Green and Elvan Foot Road Act 1798	38 Geo. 3. c. xxi	7 May 1798
An Act for making and maintaining a Road from near Dinwoodie Green, in the County of Dumfries, to or near Elvanfoot, in the County of Lanark.
Roads from Barwick, Maiden Newton, Broadwindsor, Beaminster and Frampton Act 1798	38 Geo. 3. c. xxii	7 May 1798
An Act to continue for twenty-one Years, and from thence to the End of the then next Session of Parliament, the Term, and alter the Powers, of an Act, passed in the eighteenth Year of the Reign of His present Majesty, (Note: Somerset and Dorset Roads Act 1778 (18 Geo. 3. c. 95)) for repairing the Roads from Whistle Bridge in the Parish of Barwick, in the County of Somerset, to the Turnpike Road in the Parish of Charminster, in the County of Dorset; from the Cross in the Town of Maiden Newton, to a Stream of Water in the Parish of South Perrott, in the County of Dorset; from Furze Moor Gate, in the Parish of Broadwinsor, to Lenham's Water, in the Parish of Beaminster; from Bugler's Corner, in the Town of Beaminster, to the Dorsetshire Inn, in the Parish of Woolcombe; and from the Town of Frampton, to the Western Turnpike Road near Steepleton, in the said County of Dorset.
Huddersfield and Penistone Road Act 1798	38 Geo. 3. c. xxiii	7 May 1798
An Act for continuing for twenty-one Years, and from thence to the End of the then next Session of Parliament, the Term, and altering and enlarging the Powers, of an Act passed in the seventeenth Year of the Reign of His present Majesty, (Note: Halifax to Sheffield Road Act 1777 (17 Geo. 3. c. 106)) for repairing and widening the Road from the Town of Halifax, in the West Riding of the County of York, to the Town of Sheffield, in the same Riding, so far as relates to the Road from Huddersfield to Penistone.
Stirling, Dumbarton, and Perth County Roads Act 1798	38 Geo. 3. c. xxiv	7 May 1798
An Act for more effectually repairing several Roads in the Counties of Stirling, Dumbarton, and Perth.
Bermondsey and Southwark Roads Act 1798	38 Geo. 3. c. xxv	7 May 1798
An Act for making a new Road or Street from Freeschool Street, Southwark, to Dockhead, and from thence through Hickman's Court, otherwise Rose Court, to Lilliput Hall Bridge in Bermondsey; and for enlarging, for the Term of twenty-one Years, and from thence to the End of the then next Session of Parliament, the Terms and Powers of three Acts, passed in the twenty-second Year of His late Majesty King George the Second, (Note: Southwark Roads Act 1748 (22 Geo. 2. c. 31)) and in the seventh (Note: Southwark Roads Act 1766 (7 Geo. 3. c. 64)) and thirty-first (Note: Southwark Roads Act 1791 (31 Geo. 3. c. 110)) Years of His present Majesty, for making a new Road from New Street in Southwark, to and through the several Places therein mentioned, and for repairing the same, and other Roads adjoining.
Newark-upon-Trent Improvement and Market Act 1798 (repealed)	38 Geo. 3. c. xxvi	10 May 1798
An Act for the better paving, lighting, and cleansing of the Streets, Lanes, and other Public Passages and Places, in the Town of Newark upon Trent, in the County of Nottingham; and for removing the Market for Butchers Meat in the said Town; and for regulating the said Market; and for repealing an Act made in the twenty-seventh Year of the Reign of Her late Majesty Queen Elizabeth, intituled, "An Acte for the Pavinge of Newarke upon Trent, in the Countie of Nottingham." (Note: Newark-upon-Trent (Nottinghamshire) Paving Act 1584 (27 Eliz. 1. c. 19)) (Repealed by Newark-upon-Trent Improvement Act 1851 (14 & 15 Vict. c. xcvii))
Harnham Hill Road Act 1798 (repealed)	38 Geo. 3. c. xxvii	10 May 1798
An Act to continue for the Term of twenty-one Years, and from thence to the End of the then next Session of Parliament, two Acts, severally passed in the twenty-ninth Year of the Reign of King George the Second, (Note: Wiltshire and Dorset Roads Act 1756 (29 Geo. 2. c. 54)) and in the seventeenth Year of the Reign of His present Majesty, (Note: Wilts and Dorset Roads Act 1777 (17 Geo. 3. c. 83)) for repairing the Roads from Harnham Hill, near the City of New Sarum, in the County of Wilts, to an Intrenchment on Akerwell Hill, in the County of Dorset; and from the Index Post on the Side of Harnham Hill aforesaid, to a House called Master Baker's Farm House, in the County of Wilts. (Repealed by Harnham Hill, Blandford and Dorchester Road Act 1828 (9 Geo. 4. c. xxi))
Carlisle, Penrith and Eamont Bridge Road Act 1798 (repealed)	38 Geo. 3. c. xxviii	10 May 1798
An Act for continuing for twenty-one Years, and from thence to the End of the then next Session of Parliament, the Term, and altering and enlarging the Powers, of two Acts, made in the twenty-sixth Year of the Reign of King George the Second, (Note: Carlisle and Eamont Bridge Road Act 1753 (26 Geo. 2. c. 40)) and the nineteenth Year of His present Majesty, (Note: Carlisle and Eamont Bridge Road Act 1779 (19 Geo. 3. c. 97)) for repairing the Road from the City of Carlisle to the Town of Penrith, in the County of Cumberland, and from the said Town of Penrith to Emont Bridge, which divides the Counties of Cumberland and Westmorland. (Repealed by Road from Carlisle to Penrith and to Eamont Bridge Act 1830 (11 Geo. 4 & 1 Will. 4. c. cx))
Newcastle-under-Lyme Canal and Sir Nigel Bowyer Gresley's Canal Junction Act 1798	38 Geo. 3. c. xxix	26 May 1798
An act for making and maintaining a navigable canal, or canal and inclined plane or railway, from and out of the Newcastle-under-Lyme canal to the canal of sir Nigel Bowyer Gresley baronet, near the town of Newcastle-under-Lyme and also another branch of canal, or inclined plane or railway, from and out of the said last mentioned canal, at or near Apedale, to certain coal and other works, all in the county of Stafford.
Neath Canal Navigation Act 1798	38 Geo. 3. c. xxx	26 May 1798
An act for extending the Neath canal navigation, and for amending an act passed in the thirty-first year of the reign of his present Majesty (Note: Neath Canal Act 1791 (31 Geo. 3. c. 85)) for making the said canal.
Worcester and Birmingham Canal Act 1798	38 Geo. 3. c. xxxi	26 May 1798
An act for amending and enlarging the powers of an act, passed in the thirty-first year of the reign of his present Majesty, intituled, "An act for making and maintaining a navigable canal from, or from near to, the town of Birmingham in the county of Warwick, to communicate with the river Severn, near to the city of Worcester." (Note: Worcester and Birmingham Canal Act 1791 (31 Geo. 3. c. 59))
Ashton Canal Act 1798	38 Geo. 3. c. xxxii	26 May 1798
An act to enable the company of proprietors of the canal navigation, from Manchester to or near Ashton under Lyne and Oldham, to finish and complete the same and the several cuts and other works authorised to be made and done by them, by the several acts (Note: Manchester and Oldham Canal Act 1792 (32 Geo. 3. c. 84)) (Note: Manchester and Stockport Canal Act 1793 (33 Geo. 3. c. 21)) passed for that purpose, and for amending the said acts, and granting to the said company further and other powers.
Grand Junction Canal Act 1798	38 Geo. 3. c. xxxiii	26 May 1798
An Act for confirming and carrying into Execution certain Articles of Agreement made and entered into between Beilby, Lord Bishop of London, Thomas Wood, Esq. Sir John Frederick, Bart. and Arthur Stanhope, Esq. Sir John Morshead, Bart. and Dame Elizabeth his wife, and Robert Thistlethwaite, Esq. and Selina his wife, and the Company of Proprietors of the Grand Junction Canal; and for other Purposes therein-mentioned.
St. Sepulchre's Workhouse Act 1798 (repealed)	38 Geo. 3. c. xxxiv	26 May 1798
An act for rebuilding the workhouse of the parish of Saint Sepulchre, in the city of London; and for the better relief and employment of the poor in the said parish. (Repealed by Statute Law (Repeals) Act 2008 (c. 12))
St. James' Parish, Bristol (Division) Act 1798	38 Geo. 3. c. xxxv	26 May 1798
An Act to alter and enlarge the Powers of an Act, passed in the twenty-seventh Year of the Reign of His present Majesty, intituled, "An Act for dividing the Parish of Saint James, in the City and County of Bristol, and County of Gloucester, and for building a Church, and providing a Cemetery or Church Yard and Parsonage House, within the new Parish." (Note: Saint James' Parish, Bristol Act 1787 (27 Geo. 3. c. 49))
Almond Bridge and Ballieston Roads Act 1798 (repealed)	38 Geo. 3. c. xxxvi	26 May 1798
An Act for altering the Powers of two Acts, passed in the thirty-second (Note: Edinburgh Linlithgow and Lanark Roads etc Act 1792 (32 Geo. 3. c. 120)) and thirty-fifth (Note: Edinburgh etc. Roads Act 1795 (35 Geo. 3. c. 150)) Years of the Reign of His present Majesty, for making, amending, widening, and keeping in Repair, the Roads from the New Bridge over the Water of Almond, on the Confines of the Counties of Edinburgh and Linlithgow, by Bathgate, to Baillieston, in the County of Lanerk, and certain Branches of Road from the said Line of Road, and for the other Purposes mentioned therein. (Repealed by Almond Bridge and Ballieston Roads Act 1831 (1 Will. 4. c. xliii))
York and Scarborough Roads Act 1798 (repealed)	38 Geo. 3. c. xxxvii	26 May 1798
An Act for more effectually repairing, widening, altering, and improving, the Roads from the East End of Monk Bridge, near the City of York, to New Malton, and from thence to Scarborough, in the North Riding of the County of York, and also from Spittle House, in the East Riding of the said County, to Scarborough aforefaid. (Repealed by York and Scarborough, and Spittle House and Scarborough Roads Act 1833 (3 & 4 Will. 4. c. ix))
Wiltshire and Hampshire Roads Act 1798 (repealed)	38 Geo. 3. c. xxxviii	26 May 1798
An Act for continuing for twenty-one Years, and from thence to the End of the then next Session of Parliament, two Acts, the one passed in the twenty-sixth Year of the Reign of His late Majesty King George the Second, intituled "An Act for repairing and widening the Roads leading from Lobcombe Corner, in the Parish of Winterflow, to Harnham Bridge, in the County of Wilts, and from the West Corner of Saint Anne's Street, in the City of New Sarum, to the Parishes of Landford and Brook, and from thence to Ealing, and from Landford aforesaid, through Ower and Testwood; to Ealing aforesaid, in the County of Southampton;" (Note: Wiltshire and Southampton Roads Act 1753 (26 Geo. 2. c. 66)) and the other passed in the twelfth Year of the Reign of His present Majesty, (Note: Wiltshire Roads Act 1772 (12 Geo. 3. c. 74)) to continue and enlarge the Term and Powers of the said Act, and for repairing and widening the Road from the Romsey and Ringwood Turnpike Road, near the House of Francis Fry, to Lyndhurst, and from a Place called Hampton Ford to Lamb's Corner, in the said County of Southampton, and for repairing the Footways within the said City. (Repealed by Winterslow and New Sarum Roads Act 1840 (3 & 4 Vict. c. xxxiv))
Dewsbury and Ealand Road Act 1798 (repealed)	38 Geo. 3. c. xxxix	26 May 1798
An Act for continuing for twenty-one Years, and from thence to the End of the then next Session of Parliament, the Term, and enlarging the Powers, of two Acts, made in the thirty-second Year of the Reign of King George the Second, (Note: Dewsbury to Elland Road Act 1758 (32 Geo. 2. c. 54)) and the nineteenth Year of His present Majesty, (Note: Dewsbury to Elland Road Act 1779 (19 Geo. 3. c. 88)) for repairing and widening the Road from Dewsbury to Ealand, in the West Riding of the County of York. (Repealed by Road from Dewsbury to Ealand Act 1836 (6 & 7 Will. 4. c. cxviii))
Road from Dudley Hill and from Beckwithshaw Act 1798 (repealed)	38 Geo. 3. c. xl	26 May 1798
An Act for continuing for twenty one Years, and from thence to the End of the then next Session of Parliament, the Term, and enlarging and altering the Powers, of two Acts, the one passed in the twenty-sixth Year of the Reign of King George the Second, (Note: Bradford and Wakefield Road Act 1753 (26 Geo. 2. c. 83)) and the other in the seventeenth Year of His present Majesty's Reign, (Note: Yorks Roads Act 1777 (17 Geo. 3. c. 73)) so far as the same relate to the Road from Dudley Hill, through Beckwithshaw, to Killinghall, and from Beckwithshaw to the South-west Corner of Harrogate Inclosures, in the County of York. (Repealed by Road from Dudley Hill and from Beckwithshaw Act 1816 (56 Geo. 3. c. xlviii))
Bradford to Wakefield Road Act 1798 (repealed)	38 Geo. 3. c. xli	26 May 1798
An Act for continuing for twenty-one Years, and from thence to the End of the then next Session of Parliament, the Term, and enlarging and altering the Powers, of two Acts, the one passed in the twenty-sixth Year of the Reign of King George the Second, and the other in the seventeenth Year of His present Majesty's Reign, so far as the same relate to the Road from Bradford, through Adwalton, to Wakefield, in the County of York. (Repealed by Bradford and Wakefield Road Act 1819 (59 Geo. 3. c. lxxx))
Heywood and Prestwich Road Act 1798	38 Geo. 3. c. xlii	26 May 1798
An Act for continuing for twenty-one Years, and from thence to the End of the then next Session of Parliament, the Term, and enlarging the Powers, of an Act, passed in the twenty-ninth Year of the Reign of His present Majesty, (Note: Heywood and Prestwich Road Act 1789 (29 Geo. 3. c. 110)) for repairing and widening the Road from Rochdale Lane End, in the Village of Heywood, in the Parish of Bury, to a Place called The Land's End, in the Parish of Prestwich, in the County Palatine of Lancaster.
Abingdon Roads Act 1798 (repealed)	38 Geo. 3. c. xliii	26 May 1798
An Act for continuing for twenty-one Years, and from thence to the End of the then next Session of Parliament, the Term, and enlarging the Powers, of two several Acts, the one passed in the twenty-ninth Year of the Reign of His late Majesty King George the Second, (Note: Berkshire Roads (No. 2) Act 1756 (29 Geo. 2. c. 81)) the other in the eighteenth Year of the Reign of His present Majesty, (Note: Berks Roads Act 1778 (18 Geo. 3. c. 99)) for amending and keeping in Repair the Roads leading from a Place called Fryer Bacon's Study to Chilton Pond, and from the Top of Hinkley Hill to Foxcombe Hill Gate, in the Road leading to Farringdon, in the County of Berks, so far as the same relate to the Abingdon District of the said Roads therein mentioned. (Repealed by Abingdon and Chilton Pond Road Act 1841 (4 & 5 Vict. c. cxi))
Roads in Worcester, Stafford and Salop Act 1798 (repealed)	38 Geo. 3. c. xliv	26 May 1798
An Act for continuing for twenty-one Years, and from thence to the End of the then next Session of Parliament, the Term, and altering and enlarging the Powers of two Acts, of the second (Note: Worcester and Salop Roads Act 1762 (2 Geo. 3. c. 78)) and twenty-second (Note: Worcester Roads Act 1782 (22 Geo. 3. c. 95)) Years of His present Majesty, for amending and widening the Road leading from Colley Gate, in Cradley, and from Pedmore to Holly Hall, and other Roads therein mentioned, in the Counties of Worcester, Stafford, and Salop, so far as the same relate to the Road leading from Pedmore to Holly Hall, and for repairing several other Roads in the Counties of Worcester and Stafford. (Repealed by Pedmore and Rowley Road Act 1852 (15 & 16 Vict. c. lxxxvi))
Edinburgh County Roads and Bridges Act 1798	38 Geo. 3. c. xlv	26 May 1798
An Act for enlarging the Powers of and rendering more effectual, several Acts of the twenty-fourth (Note: Edinburgh and Leith Road Act 1750 (24 Geo. 2. c. 35)) and twenty-eighth (Note: Edinburgh Roads Act 1755 (28 Geo. 2. c. 39)) Years of His late Majesty's Reign, and of the fourth (Note: Edinburgh and Linlighgow Roads Act 1764 (4 Geo. 3. c. 86)) and twenty-ninth (Note: Edinburgh Roads Act 1789 (29 Geo. 3. c. 105)) Years of His present Majesty's Reign, for repairing the High Roads in the County of Edinburgh; and for building Bridges over the Rivers South and North Elk, and the Water of Leith, in the said County.
Wincanton Improvement Act 1798	38 Geo. 3. c. xlvi	1 June 1798
An Act for paving the Footways, and for cleansing, lighting, and regulating the Streets, Lanes, and other public Passages and Places, within the Town of Wincanton, in the County of Somerset; and for removing and preventing Nuisances, Annoyances, and Obstructions therein.
Stainforth and Keadby Canal Act 1798	38 Geo. 3. c. xlvii	1 June 1798
An act for amending and enlarging the powers of an act, passed in the thirty-third year of the reign of his present Majesty, (Note: Stainforth and Keadby Canal Act 1793 (33 Geo. 3. c. 117)) for making and maintaining a navigable canal from the river Dunn navigation cut, at or near Stainforth, in the west riding of the county of York, to join and communicate with the river Trent, at or near Keadby, in the county of Lincoln; and also a collateral cut from the said canal, to join the said river Dunn, in the parish of Thorne, in the said riding upon.
Alconbury Hill and Norman Cross Roads (Huntingdonshire) Act 1798 (repealed)	38 Geo. 3. c. xlviii	1 June 1798
An Act for repairing the Roads from the Stone Pillar upon Alconbury Hill, to Wansford Bridge; and from Norman Cross to the South End of Peterborough Bridge, all in the County of Huntingdon; and for repealing certain Acts relating thereto. (Repealed by Alconbury Hill and Norman Cross Roads (Lincolnshire) Act 1827 (7 & 8 Geo. 4. c. lx))
Wansford Bridge, Stamford and Bourn Road Act 1798 (repealed)	38 Geo. 3. c. xlix	1 June 1798
An Act to continue for twenty-one Years, and from thence to the End of the then next Session of Parliament, the Term, and amend the Powers, of three Acts passed in the twenty-second (Note: Northamptonshire Roads Act 1748 (22 Geo. 2. c. 17)) and twenty-ninth (Note: Northamptonshire and Lincoln Roads Act 1756 (29 Geo. 2. c. 76)) Years of the Reign of King George the Second, and in the sixteenth Year of the Reign of His present Majesty, (Note: Stamford Roads Act 1776 (16 Geo. 3. c. 74)) for repairing the Road from Wansford Bridge, in the County of Northampton, to the Town of Stamford, in the County of Lincoln, and from Stamford aforesaid to the Market Cross in the Town of Bourn, (Note: The market cross in Bourne was located at the junction of the A15 North Street/South Street and the B1193 West Street/Abbey Road. 52°46′05″N 0°22′38″W) in the said County of Lincoln, and from the North End of Stamford Bridge (Note: The Town Bridge in Stamford. 52°39′01″N 0°28′41″W) to Scotgate, (Note: Scot Gate was located in the town walls of Stamford, at a location that is now a junction between the B1081/A606 Scotgate, and the A6121 West Street/North Street. 52°39′10″N 0°29′01″W) both in Stamford aforesaid. (Repealed by Wansford Bridge and Bourn Road Act 1820 (1 Geo. 4. c. xxii))
Willoughby Hedge Roads Act 1798	38 Geo. 3. c. l	1 June 1798
An Act for continuing for twenty-one Years, and from thence to the End of the then next Session of Parliament, the Term, and altering and enlarging the Powers, of two Acts, the one passed in the twenty-ninth Year of the Reign of His late Majesty King George the Second, (Note: Wincanton Roads Act 1756 (29 Geo. 2. c. 49)) and the other in the seventeenth Year of the Reign of His present Majesty, (Note: Wilts and Somerset Roads Act 1777 (17 Geo. 3. c. 93)) for repairing and widening the Road from the eighteen Mile Stone, beyond Willoughby Hedge, through the Town of Mere, in the County of Wilts, and through Wincanton to Charlton Houthorn, and from thence to Milborne Port, and from Willoughby Hedge aforesaid, to the West End of Long Lane in Kilmington, and from Wincanton aforesaid, to the Sherborn Turnpike Cross Gate, on Cattle Hill; and from Wincanton to Sparkford, in the County of Somerset; and also for altering, improving, and keeping in Repair, several other Roads communicating therewith.
Rochdale and Burnley Road Act 1798 (repealed)	38 Geo. 3. c. li	1 June 1798
An Act for more effectually amending, widening, altering, improving, and keeping in Repair the Road leading from the Town of Rochdale, in the County Palatine of Lancaster, to the Town of Burnley, in the said County. (Repealed by Rochdale and Burnley Road Act 1825 (6 Geo. 4. c. cxlv))
Road from Doncaster to the Bawtry and Retford Turnpike Road Act 1798 (repealed)	38 Geo. 3. c. lii	1 June 1798
An Act for continuing for twenty-one Years, and from thence to the End of the then next Session of Parliament, the Term of an Act, made in the sixteenth Year of the Reign of His present Majesty, (Note: Doncaster to Bawtry Roads Act 1776 (16 Geo. 3. c. 71)) for amending and keeping in Repair the Road from Doncaster to the Turnpike Road which leads from Bawtry to Retford, in the Counties of York and Nottingham, and for amending the said Act. (Repealed by Road from Doncaster to Bawtry Act 1832 (2 & 3 Will. 4. c. xx))
Roads from Henfield and from Poyning's Common (Sussex) Act 1798	38 Geo. 3. c. liii	1 June 1798
An Act for continuing for the Term of twenty-one Years, and from thence to the End of the then next Session of Parliament, the Term, and altering and enlarging the Powers, of an Act, passed in the seventeenth Year of the Reign of His present Majesty, (Note: Sussex Roads (No. 2) Act 1777 (17 Geo. 3. c. 91)) for repairing and widening the Road leading from the Maypole in the Town of Henfield, over Poynings Common, to the Town of Brighthelmstone, and from Poynings Common aforesaid to High Cross, in the Parish of Albourne, and from thence for the Distance of two Furlongs of the Road or Lane leading towards Twineham, and from the Marle Pit near the Bottom of Saddlescomb Hill, in the Parish of Newtimber, to the Marle Pit fronting Newtimber Broad Lane, in the same Parish, in the County of Sussex; and also for repairing and widening the Road from the End of the two Furlongs of the Road or Lane leading towards Twineham, unto Herring's Clappers, in the Parish of Twineham, in the said County.
Edinburgh Two Pennies Scots Act 1798 (repealed)	38 Geo. 3. c. liv	21 June 1798
An act for further continuing for thirty-eight years the term granted by an act of the twenty-fifth year of the reign of his late majesty King George the Second, (Note: Edinburgh Beer Duties Act 1751 (25 Geo. 2. c. 9)) for continuing the duty of two pennies Scots upon every pint of ale and beer sold in the city of Edinburgh, and places adjacent, for the purposes therein mentioned; and for explaining and amending the said act. (Repealed by Statute Law (Repeals) Act 2013 (c. 2))
London Bread Trade Act 1798 (repealed)	38 Geo. 3. c. lv	21 June 1798
An act for amending an act, made in the last session of parliament, (Note: Assise and Making of Bread, London Act 1797 (37 Geo. 3. c. 98)) intituled, "An act to amend and render more effectual an act, made in the thirty-first year of the reign of his late majesty King George the Second, (Note: Making of Bread Act 1757 (31 Geo. 2. c. 29)) intituled, 'An act for the due making of bread, and to regulate the price and assize thereof, and to punish persons who shall adulterate meal, flour, or bread,' so far as the same relates to the assize and making of bread to be sold in the city of London, and the liberties thereof, and within the weekly bills of mortality, and within ten miles of the Royal Exchange." (Repealed by London Bread Trade Act 1815 (55 Geo. 3. c. xcix))
London Coal Trade Act 1798 (repealed)	38 Geo. 3. c. lvi	21 June 1798
An act for continuing until the first day of June one thousand eight hundred and twelve, and from thence to the end of the then next session of parliament, an act, passed in the seventh year of the reign of his present Majesty, (Note: Coal Metage, etc., London Act 1766 (7 Geo. 3. c. 23)) to prevent frauds and abuses in the admeasurement of coals, sold by wharf measure, within the city of London and the liberties thereof, and between Tower Dock and Limehouse Hole, in the county of Middlesex. (Repealed by London, Westminster, Middlesex, Surrey, Kent and Essex Coal Trade Act 1807 (47 Geo. 3 Sess. 2. c.lxviii))
Northern Lighthouse Company Act 1798 (repealed)	38 Geo. 3. c. lvii	21 June 1798
An act for incorporating the commissioners appointed for erecting certain light-houses in the northern parts of Great Britain. (Repealed by Merchant Shipping Repeal Act 1854 (17 & 18 Vict. c. 120))
Lancaster Annual General Sessions Act 1798 or the Lancaster Quarter Sessions Act 1798 (repealed)	38 Geo. 3. c. lviii	21 June 1798
An act for obviating and removing doubts respecting the holding of the adjournments of the general court of quarter sessions of the peace in and for the county palatine of Lancaster, and for authorising the justices of the peace, acting in and for the said county, to hold an annual general session, and also a special session, for the purposes therein mentioned. (Repealed by Lancashire County (Lunatic Asylums and other Powers) Act 1891 (54 & 55 Vict. c. xx))
Malmesbury Improvement Act 1798	38 Geo. 3. c. lix	21 June 1798
An act for paving the footways, and for cleansing, lighting and regulating the streets, and other publick passages and places, within the borough of Malmesbury, in the county of Wilts and the avenues leading into the same; and for removing and preventing nuisances, annoyances, and obstructions therein.
Little Tower Hill Sewer Act 1798	38 Geo. 3. c. lx	21 June 1798
An act for making and maintaining a new sewer, upon Little Tower Hill, within the county of Middlesex.
Temple Bar Improvement Act 1798	38 Geo. 3. c. lxi	21 June 1798
An act to explain, amend, and enlarge the powers of an act, passed in the thirty-fifth year of the reign of his present Majesty, intituled, "An act for widening and improving the entrance into the city of London, near Temple Bar, for making a more commodious street or passage at Snow Hill, and for raising, on the credit of the orphan's fund, a sum of money for those purposes." (Note: Temple Bar, etc. Act 1795 (35 Geo. 3. c. 126))
St. Peter's Church, St. Albans Act 1798	38 Geo. 3. c. lxii	21 June 1798
An Act for authorizing the Trustees therein named, to raise Money by Rates or Assessments, within the Parish of Saint Peter, in the Borough and Liberty of Saint Alban, in the County of Hertford, for the better and more effectually discharging Annuities, heretofore granted to certain Persons who have advanced Money towards repairing the Church belonging to the said Parish.
East Riding Drainage Act 1798 or the Beverley and Barmston Drainage Act 1798	38 Geo. 3. c. lxiii	21 June 1798
An Act for draining, preserving, and improving, the Low Grounds and Carrs, lying in the several Parishes, Lordships, Townships, Hamlets, Precincts, and Territories, of Beverley, Saint John of Beverley, Grovehill, Sandholme, Storkhill, Molescroft, Leckonfield, Arram, Scorbrough, Lockington, Ayke, Beswick, Wilfholme, Kilnwick, Watton, Hutton-Cranswick, Rotsea, Featherholme, Skerne, Brigham, Fishholme, Nafferton, Lowthorpe, Harpham, Little Kelk, Foston, Burton-Agnes, Gransmoor, Liffet, Barmston, Ulram otherwise Owram, Skipsea, Dringhoe, Beeford, North Frodingham, Brandes-Burton, Moor-Town, Leven, Emmotland, Hempholme, Goodhill House, and Struncheon Hill, all in the East Riding of the County of York.
Northam Bridge and Approaches Act 1798 (repealed)	38 Geo. 3. c. lxiv	21 June 1798
An Act to alter and enlarge the Powers of an Act, passed in the thirty sixth Year of the Reign of His present Majesty, intituled "An Act for building a Bridge over the River Itchin, at or near Northam, within the Liberties of the Town and County of the Town of Southampton, and for making a Road from the said Town to the said Bridge, and from thence to communicate with the Road leading from West End to Botley, in the County of Southampton." (Note: Northam Bridge and Approaches Act 1796 (36 Geo. 3. c. 94)) (Repealed by Southampton Corporation Act 1928 (18 & 19 Geo. 5. c. cviii))
Oxford District of Farringdon Road Act 1798 (repealed)	38 Geo. 3. c. lxv	21 June 1798
An Act for continuing for twenty-one Years, and from thence to the End of the then next Session of Parliament, the Term, and altering the Powers of two several Acts, the one passed in the twenty-ninth Year of the Reign of His late Majesty King George the Second, and the other in the eighteenth Year of the Reign of His present Majesty, for amending and keeping in Repair the Roads leading from a Place called Fryer Bacon's Study to Chilton Pond, and from the Top of Hinkley Hill to Foxcombe-hill Gate, in the Road leading to Farringdon, in the County of Berks, so far as the same relate to the Oxford District of the said Roads therein mentioned. (Repealed by Statute Law (Repeals) Act 2013 (c. 2))
Roads from Tetbury, Malmesbury, Farringdon and Sherstone Act 1798 (repealed)	38 Geo. 3. c. lxvi	21 June 1798
An Act for more effectually repairing, widening, and improving the Road from Tetbury, in the County of Gloucester, to and through Malmesbury, to the Churchway in Lower Stanton Field, in the County of Wilts, there to join the Turnpike Road leading from Chippenham Bridge to Lower Stanton aforesaid; and from Malmesbury to the Turnpike Road at or near Jackament's Bottom, in the said County of Gloucester; and also the Road from Farringdon to Cricklade, from thence to Malmesbury, and to the Turnpike Road at Acton Turville; and also from Sherstone to the Turnpike Road leading from Tetbury to Bath; and for making, maintaining, widening, and improving several other Roads communicating therewith. (Repealed by Malmesbury Turnpike Roads Act 1820 (1 Geo. 4. c. xxxii))
Bagshot and Odiham Roads Act 1798 (repealed)	38 Geo. 3. c. lxvii	21 June 1798
An act for continuing for twenty-one years, and from thence to the end of the then next session of parliament, and rendering more effectual, several acts for repairing the road from the Golden Farmer near Bagshot, (Note: The Golden Farmer Inn, later named the Jolly Farmer, was located at the junction of the A325 and A30 between Camberley and Bagshot. 51°20′56″N 0°42′48″W) in the county of Surrey, to Hertford-Bridge Hill, (Note: The village of Hartfordbridge in Hampshire.) in the county of Southampton, and from thence to Basingstoke and Odiham, both in the said county of Southampton; and for repairing and widening the road from the southern extremity of Northwanborough Lane near Odiham aforesaid, over Northwanborough Common, Hook Common, and Bartley Heath, and through the parishes of Rotherwicke, Mattingley, and Heckfield, to a place called the Bull Inn in the parish of Swallowfield, on the turnpike road leading from the town of Reading, in the county of Berks to Basingstoke aforesaid. (Repealed by Bagshot and Basingstoke and Odiham Roads Act 1819 (59 Geo. 3. c. vii))
Shrewsbury Free Grammar School Act 1798 or the Shrewsbury School Act 1798	38 Geo. 3. c. lxviii	28 June 1798
An act for the better government and regulation of the free grammar school of King Edward the Sixth, at Shrewsbury, in the county of Salop.
Out Parish of St. Philip and Jacob and Parish of St. George (Gloucestershire) Poor Relief Act 1798	38 Geo. 3. c. lxix	28 June 1798
An act for separating the two parishes, called The Out Parish of Saint Philip and Jacob, and The Parish of Saint George, in the county of Gloucester, as to the maintenance of the poor and the repairs of the highways of those parishes, and as to all rates, assessments, and taxes, except the land tax; and for providing a workhouse for the reception of the poor of the said parish of Saint George; and for the better relief and management of the poor of both parishes.
Outwell, Stow Bardolph, Wimboltsham and Downham Drainage Act 1798	38 Geo. 3. c. lxx	28 June 1798
An act for draining and preserving certain lands and fen grounds lying in the parishes of Outwell, Stow Bardolph, Wimbotsham, and Downham, in the county of Norfolk.
Crossford Bridge and Manchester Road Act 1798 (repealed)	38 Geo. 3. c. lxxi	28 June 1798
An act for more effectually widening, repairing, and amending the road from Crossford Bridge, through the townships of Stretford and Hulme, to the town of Manchester, in the county palatine of Lancaster. (Repealed by Road from Crossford Bridge to Manchester Act 1819 (59 Geo. 3. c. lvi))
Liverpool Security Act 1798	38 Geo. 3. c. lxxii	29 June 1798
An act for the better security and defence of the town and port of Liverpool.

=== Private acts ===
Short title	Citation	Royal assent
Long title
Chedzoy Inclosure Act 1798	38 Geo. 3. c. 1 Pr.	12 January 1798
An act for dividing and allotting the commonable pastures within the parish of Chedzoy, in the county of Somerset.
Hethersett Inclosure Act 1798	38 Geo. 3. c. 2 Pr.	12 January 1798
An act for dividing, allotting, and enclosing, the common fields, commons, commonable lands, and waste grounds, within the parish of Hethersett, in the county of Norfolk.
Elsted Marsh Inclosure Act 1798	38 Geo. 3. c. 3 Pr.	12 January 1798
An act for dividing, allotting, and enclosing, a certain waste or common, called Elsted Marsh, within the several parishes of Elsted and Trotton, or one of them, in the county of Sussex.
Jolivet's Naturalization Act 1798	38 Geo. 3. c. 4 Pr.	12 January 1798
An act for naturalizing Henry Jolivet.
Schmiding's Naturalization Act 1798	38 Geo. 3. c. 5 Pr.	12 January 1798
An act for naturalizing John Fredrick Peter Schmiding.
Pieschel's Naturalization Act 1798	38 Geo. 3. c. 6 Pr.	12 January 1798
An act for naturalizing Augustus Frederick Pieschel.
Wegener's Naturalization Act 1798	38 Geo. 3. c. 7 Pr.	12 January 1798
An act for naturalizing John Joachim Diederick Wegener.
Lord Braybrooke's Name Act 1798	38 Geo. 3. c. 8 Pr.	20 February 1798
An act to enable the right honourable Richard Aldworth lord Braybrocke, baron of Braybrooke, and Richard Neville, Henry Neville, George Neville, and William Neville, and all and every other son and sons of the said Richard Aldworth lord Braybrooke, and their issue male, respectively, when they shall respectively become beneficially entitled to the possession, or to the rents and profits, of certain estates devised by the will of the late right honourable John Griffin, lord Howard de Walden and lord Braybrooke, deceased, or shall become entitled to the peerage of the barony of Braybrooke in possession, to use and take the surname, and bear the arms, of Griffin, pursuant to the said will.
Sack's Naturalization Act 1798	38 Geo. 3. c. 9 Pr.	20 February 1798
An act for naturalizing Lewis Sack.
Middlezoy Inclosure Act 1798	38 Geo. 3. c. 10 Pr.	23 February 1798
An act for dividing and allotting the open and commonable pasture, and for exchanging, allotting, and improving, certain open and commonable arable lands, within the parish of Middlezoy, in the county of Somerset.
Great or East Leke (Nottinghamshire) Inclosure Act 1798	38 Geo. 3. c. 11 Pr.	9 March 1798
An act for dividing and enclosing the several open fields, lammas closes, meadows, pastures, commons, and waste grounds, within the parish of Great Leke, otherwise East Leke, in the county of Nottingham.
Fozard's Divorce Act 1798	38 Geo. 3. c. 12 Pr.	9 March 1798
An act to dissolve the marriage of James Fozard with Sarah Sophia Leckie, his now wife, and to enable him to marry again, and for other purposes therein mentioned.
Fournier's Naturalization Act 1798	38 Geo. 3. c. 13 Pr.	9 March 1798
An act for naturalizing John Lewis Fournier.
Naturalization of John Iselin and Daniel Eckenstein Act 1798	38 Geo. 3. c. 14 Pr.	9 March 1798
An act for naturalizing John Frederick Iselin and Daniel Eckenstein.
Pelerin's Naturalization Act 1798	38 Geo. 3. c. 15 Pr.	9 March 1798
An act for naturalizing Henry Ferdinand Pelerin.
Chatfield's Estate Act 1798	38 Geo. 3. c. 16 Pr.	5 April 1798
An act for vesting divers lands and hereditaments, in the parish of Chittingly otherwise Chiddingly, in the county of Sussex, part of the settled estate of the reverend Henry Chatfield clerk, in him and his heirs, and for substituting and settling other lands and hereditaments in the parishes of Balcombe and Westhoathly, in the said county, the estate and inheritance of the said Henry Chatfield, of greater value in lieu thereof.
Askerton, Barony of Gilsland (Cumberland) Inclosure Act 1798	38 Geo. 3. c. 17 Pr.	5 April 1798
An act for dividing and enclosing the moors, commons, and waste grounds, within that part of the manor of Askerton, in the barony of Gilsland, which lies within the parish of Stapleton, in the county of Cumberland.
Upper and Nether Denton, Barony of Gilsland (Cumberland) Inclosure Act 1798	38 Geo. 3. c. 18 Pr.	5 April 1798
An act for dividing and enclosing the moors, commons, and waste grounds, in the manors of Upper Denton and Nether Denton, within, and parcel of, the barony of Gilsland, in the county of Cumberland.
Sowerby Inclosure Act 1798	38 Geo. 3. c. 19 Pr.	5 April 1798
An act for dividing, allotting, and enclosing, the open town field called Sowerby Field, a certain stinted pasture called The Ox Moor, and a common or moor called South Moor, and other waste grounds, within the township of Sowerby, in the north riding of the county of York.
Chilton Inclosure Act 1798	38 Geo. 3. c. 20 Pr.	5 April 1798
An act for dividing and allotting the open and commonable pastures, and for exchanging, allotting, and improving, the open and commonable arable lands, within the hamlet of Chilton, in the parish of Moorlinch, in the county of Somerset.
Emberton Inclosure Act 1798	38 Geo. 3. c. 21 Pr.	5 April 1798
An act for dividing and enclosing the open and common fields, meadows, lands, commons, and commonable places, lying and being within the manor and parish of Emberton, in the county of Buckingham.
Upton and Milton Inclosure Act 1798	38 Geo. 3. c. 22 Pr.	5 April 1798
An act for dividing, allotting, and enclosing, certain open and common fields, lying within the several tythings of Upton and Milton, within the parish of East Knoyle otherwise Bishops Knoyle, in the county of Wilts.
Keyworth Inclosure Act 1798	38 Geo. 3. c. 23 Pr.	5 April 1798
An act for dividing and enclosing the open fields, meadows, pastures, commons, and waste grounds, within the township or liberty of Keyworth, in the county of Nottingham.
Guiting Power Inclosure Act 1798	38 Geo. 3. c. 24 Pr.	5 April 1798
An act for dividing and enclosing the open, arable, and common fields, downs, pastures, and commonable lands, within the parish of Guiting Power, in the county of Gloucester.
Hawarden Inclosure Act 1798	38 Geo. 3. c. 25 Pr.	5 April 1798
An act for dividing, allotting, and enclosing, all the commons and waste lands in the townships of Broughton, Pentrobin, and Bannell, within the manor and parish of Hawarden, in the county of Flint.
Bozeat Inclosure Act 1798	38 Geo. 3. c. 26 Pr.	5 April 1798
An act for dividing and enclosing the open and common fields, meadows, pastures, and other commonable lands and grounds, in the parish of Bozeat, in the county of Northampton.
Kelmscott Inclosure Act 1798	38 Geo. 3. c. 27 Pr.	5 April 1798
An act for dividing, allotting, and enclosing, the common fields, common meadows, common pastures, and all other commonable lands, within the hamlet of Kelmscot, in the parish of Broadwell, in the county of Oxford.
Messingham Inclosure Act 1798	38 Geo. 3. c. 28 Pr.	5 April 1798
An act for dividing, enclosing, allotting, and improving, the several open and common fields, ings, meadows, pastures, moors, commons, wastes, and other uninclosed lands and grounds, within the township of Messingham, and that part of the hamlet of East Butterwick, in the parish of Messingham, in the county of Lincoln.
Ulley Inclosure Act 1798	38 Geo. 3. c. 29 Pr.	5 April 1798
An act for dividing and enclosing the common fields, mesne enclosures, and waste lands, within the township of Ulley, in the several parishes of Treeton and Aston, in the west riding of the county of York.
Wanostrecht's Naturalization Act 1798	38 Geo. 3. c. 30 Pr.	5 April 1798
An act for naturalizing Nicholas Wanostrecht.
Naturalization of Jacob Reichard and Peter Poland Act 1798	38 Geo. 3. c. 31 Pr.	5 April 1798
An act for naturalizing Jacob Reichard and Peter Raymond Poland.
Portbury Inclosure Act 1798	38 Geo. 3. c. 32 Pr.	21 April 1798
An act for dividing, allotting, and enclosing, certain moors, commons, or waste lands, lying within the manor and parish of Portbury, in the county of Somerset.
Pescod's Estate Act 1798	38 Geo. 3. c. 33 Pr.	7 May 1798
An act to enable George Pescod, esquire, a lunatic, or his committee, to execute conveyances, surrenders, and assignments, of such of the estates devised by the will of William Pescod, esquire, deceased, in trust, for payment of his debts and legacies, as are, or shall be, sold under the decree of the high court of chancery.
Stanton Inclosure Act 1798	38 Geo. 3. c. 34 Pr.	7 May 1798
An act for dividing, allotting, and enclosing, the common fields, half year or shack lands, lammas meadows, commons, and waste grounds, within the manor and parith of Stanton, in the county of Suffolk.
Medstead and Bentworth Inclosure Act 1798	38 Geo. 3. c. 35 Pr.	7 May 1798
An act for dividing, allotting, and enclosing, the open and common fields in the parishes of Medstead and Bentworth, in the county of Southampton.
Reydon Inclosure Act 1798	38 Geo. 3. c. 36 Pr.	7 May 1798
An act for dividing and enclosing the heaths, fen grounds, commons, and waste lands, within the parish of Reydon, in the county of Suffolk.
Bradford Peverell Inclosure Act 1798	38 Geo. 3. c. 37 Pr.	7 May 1798
An act for dividing and allotting the open and common fields, and other commonable lands and grounds, within the parish of Bradford Peverell, in the county of Dorset.
Rockborne and Wichbury Inclosure Act 1798	38 Geo. 3. c. 38 Pr.	7 May 1798
An act for dividing and allotting the open and common fields, and other commonable lands and grounds, within the parishes of Rockborne, in the county of Southampton, and Wichbury, in the county of Wilts.
Gisleham and Pakefield Inclosure Act 1798	38 Geo. 3. c. 39 Pr.	7 May 1798
An act for dividing and enclosing the heaths, fen, grounds, commons, and waste lands, within the parishes of Gisleham and Pakefield, in the county of Suffolk.
Honeywood's Estate Act 1798	38 Geo. 3. c. 40 Pr.	26 May 1798
An act for vesting certain undivided moieties of several messuages, lands, and hereditaments, in Sussex, part of the settled estates of Sir John Honywood, baronet, in trustees, to be sold, and for laying out the money arising by sale thereof, under the direction of the court of chancery, in the purchase of other estates to be settled to the same uses.
Elston's Estate Act 1798	38 Geo. 3. c. 41 Pr.	26 May 1798
An act for vesting certain settled estates of Torry Elston, late of Holbeach Marsh, in the county of Lincoln, grazier, but now of Wisbeach Saint Peter's, in the isle of Ely, in the county of Cambridge, merchant, and Elizabeth his wife, situate at Gonnerby, Manthorpe, and Allington, in the said county of Lincoln, in trustees, in trust, to convey the same to the right honourable Brownlow lord Brownlow, and for laying out the purchase money in the purchase of other hereditaments, to be settled to the same uses.
Houblon's Estate Act 1798	38 Geo. 3. c. 42 Pr.	26 May 1798
An act for exchanging part of the estates settled by the will of Jacob Houblon, esquire, for part of the estates comprized in the marriage settlement of his son John Houblon, esquire.
Baily's Estate Act 1798	38 Geo. 3. c. 43 Pr.	26 May 1798
An act for vesting the settled estate of Edward Seymour Baily, esquire, and Phillis his wife, in the county of Kent, in trustees, to be sold, and for applying part of the monies thence arising in discharge of incumbrances, and for laying out the residue, under the direction of the court of chancery, in the purchase of other estates, to be settled in lieu thereof.
Lichfield Cathedral Act 1798	38 Geo. 3. c. 44 Pr.	26 May 1798
An act to explain and amend an act, (Note: Lichfield Cathedral Act 1797 (37 Geo. 3. c. 20 Pr.)) passed in the last session of parliament, intituled, "An act to explain and amend an act, (Note: Lichfield Chapter Act 1706 (4 & 5 Ann. c. 33 Pr.)) passed in the fourth and fifth years of the reign of her late majesty Queen Anne, intituled, 'An act for augmenting the number of canons residentiary in the cathedral church of Lichfield, and for improving the deanry and prebends of the said cathedral,'" and to make further provision for the canons residentiary in the said cathedral church, and an addition to the fabrick fund thereof.
Jones' Estate Act 1797 (repealed)	38 Geo. 3. c. 45 Pr.	26 May 1798
An act for vesting certain freehold and copyhold estates devised by the will of the late Arthur Jones, esquire, deceased, in the counties of Kent, Nottingham, Carmarthen, Cardigan, and Middlesex, and in the cities and liberties of London and Westminster, in trustees, to be sold, and for laying out the monies to arise by such sale, together with the sum of fifty-three thousand three hundred and thirty-three pounds three shillings and four-pence, three pounds per centum consolidated bank annuities, standing in the name of the accountant general of the high court of chancery, on trust, in a certain cause in the said court, Macknamara against Jones, being the clear residue of the personal estate of the said testator Arthur Jones, in the purchase of other lands and hereditaments to be settled to the same uses, and for enabling the said trustees to grant leases of the estates so to be purchased, and also to cut timber growing thereupon, subject to restrictions. (Repealed by Jones' Estate Act 1807 (47 Geo. 3 Sess. 2. c. cxviii))
Catcott Inclosure Act 1798	38 Geo. 3. c. 46 Pr.	26 May 1798
An act for dividing and allotting the open and commonable pasture and turbary lands, and for exchanging, allotting, and fencing, the open and commonable arable lands, and for stinting and regulating the stocking and depasturing certain droves, in the village or hamlet of Catcott, within the parish of Moorlinch, in the county of Somerset.
Sandy Inclosure Act 1798	38 Geo. 3. c. 47 Pr.	26 May 1798
An act for dividing and enclosing the several open and common fields, meadows, pastures, waste lands, and other commonable lands and grounds, in the parish of Sandy, in the county of Bedford.
Wilbarston Inclosure Act 1798	38 Geo. 3. c. 48 Pr.	26 May 1798
An act for dividing and enclosing the open and common fields, common meadows, common pastures, commonable lands, and waste grounds, in the parish of Wilbarston, in the county of Northampton.
Bleathwood Common Inclosure Act 1798	38 Geo. 3. c. 49 Pr.	26 May 1798
An act for dividing, allotting, and enclosing, the common, or parcel of waste land, called Bleathwood Common, within the parish of Little Hereford, in the county of Hereford.
Sicklinghall with Woodhall Inclosure Act 1798	38 Geo. 3. c. 50 Pr.	26 May 1798
An act for dividing and enclosing a certain common and waste grounds within the manor and township of Sicklinghall with Woodhall, in the parish of Kirkby Overblow, in the west riding of the county of York.
Shrewton Inclosure Act 1798	38 Geo. 3. c. 51 Pr.	26 May 1798
An act for dividing and allotting, in severalty, the common arable fields, common downs, common meadows, common pastures, and other commonable places, within the parish of Shrewton, in the county of Wilts.
Weston Turville Inclosure Act 1798	38 Geo. 3. c. 52 Pr.	26 May 1798
An act for dividing and enclosing the open and common fields, common meadows, and other commonable lands, within the parish of Weston Turville, in the county of Buckingham.
Tweedmouth and Spittle Common Inclosure Act 1798	38 Geo. 3. c. 53 Pr.	26 May 1798
An act for dividing, allotting, enclosing, and improving, a moor, or tract of waste ground, called Tweedmouth and Spittle Common, and all other the commonable lands and grounds, in the chapelry of Tweedmouth, and county of Durham, and for extinguishing the right of common upon certain ancient infield lands within the said chapelry.
Birmingham Inclosure Act 1798	38 Geo. 3. c. 54 Pr.	26 May 1798
An act for dividing, allotting, and enclosing, the several commons and waste lands lying within the manor and parish of Birmingham, in the county of Warwick.
Harston, Hauxton, Little Shelford and Newton (Cambridgeshire) Inclosure Act 1798	38 Geo. 3. c. 55 Pr.	26 May 1798
An act for allotting and dividing the open and common fields, commonable lands, and waste grounds, lying within the parishes of Harston and Hauxton, and certain open and common fields, commonable lands, and waste grounds, lying in certain fields called Mount Field, Red Dean Field, and Pefills Field, and part of a certain moor called Little Shelford Moor, within Harston and Hauxton aforesaid, and the parishes of Little Shelford and Newton, some or one of them, all in the county of Cambridge.
Kirkby Overblow Inclosure Act 1798	38 Geo. 3. c. 56 Pr.	26 May 1798
An act for dividing and enclosing the common and waste grounds, and commonable lands, within the manor and township of Kirkby Overblow, in the parish of Kirkby Overblow, in the west riding of the county of York.
Boddington's Divorce Act 1798	38 Geo. 3. c. 57 Pr.	26 May 1798
An act to dissolve the marriage of Samuel Boddington, esquire, with Grace Ashburner his now wife, and to enable him to marry again, and for other purposes therein mentioned.
Twistleton's Divorce Act 1798	38 Geo. 3. c. 58 Pr.	26 May 1798
An act for dissolving the marriage of the honourable and reverend Thomas James Twisleton with Charlotte Anne Frances his now wife, late Charlotte Anne Frances Wattell, and for enabling him to marry again, and for other purposes therein mentioned.
Woodmason's Divorce Act 1798	38 Geo. 3. c. 59 Pr.	26 May 1798
An act for dissolving the marriage of James Woodmason, esquire, with Mary Magdelain his now wife, late Mary Magdelain Gaville, and for enabling him to marry again, and for other purposes therein mentioned.
Rheinwald's Naturalization Act 1798	38 Geo. 3. c. 60 Pr.	26 May 1798
An act for naturalizing Eberhard Fredrick Rheinwald.
De Visme's Naturalization Act 1798	38 Geo. 3. c. 61 Pr.	26 May 1798
An act for naturalizing Emily de Visme an infant.
Brock's Naturalization Act 1798	38 Geo. 3. c. 62 Pr.	26 May 1798
An act for naturalizing John Brock.
Guitton's Estate Act 1798	38 Geo. 3. c. 63 Pr.	1 June 1798
An act for vesting part of the settled estate of John Guitton, esquire, deceased, in trustees, to be conveyed pursuant to articles entered into for the sale thereof, and for laying out the money arising therefrom in the purchase of other estates to be settled to the same uses.
Lawley's Estate Act 1798	38 Geo. 3. c. 64 Pr.	1 June 1798
An act for vesting part of the settled estates of Sir Robert Lawley, baronet, in the counties of Stafford and Warwick, in trustees, and their heirs, in trust, for the said Sir Robert Lawley, to be sold, and for settling other lands and hereditaments, in the county of Salop, of greater value, in lieu thereof.
Whipsnade Inclosure Act 1798	38 Geo. 3. c. 65 Pr.	1 June 1798
An act for extinguishing all right of common in, upon, or over, certain woods or wood grounds, in the parish of Whipsnade, in the county of Bedford; and for enabling William Beckford, esquire, the owner of the said woods or wood grounds, to enclose the same; and for vesting a perpetual clear yearly rent charge, to be issuing out of the same woods or wood grounds, in the churchwardens and overseers of the poor of the said parish, to be applied in aid of the poor rates, as a compensation for such right of common.
Chilton Trinity, Wembdon, Durleigh, and Bridgewater (Somerset) Inclosure Act 1798	38 Geo. 3. c. 66 Pr.	1 June 1798
An act for dividing and allotting certain commons or moors called Chilton Common, otherwise Wild Marsh, Pury Green, and Harp Common, and also for dividing, regulating, and improving, certain common fields or grounds called Chilton Moor, and Pury Moor, all situate within the several parishes of Chilton Trinity, Wembdon, Durleigh, and Bridgwater, in the County of Somerset.
Kensworth Inclosure Act 1798	38 Geo. 3. c. 67 Pr.	1 June 1798
An act for dividing and allotting, with powers to enclose, the open and common fields, common pastures, commons, and waste lands, within the parish of Kensworth, in the county of Hertford.
Lloyd's Estate Act 1798	38 Geo. 3. c. 68 Pr.	21 June 1798
An act for vesting certain estates devised by the will of Sir Edward Lloyd, baronet, in trustees, to be sold, and for laying out the money to arise by such sale in the purchase of other estates, to be settled, under the direction of the court of chancery, to the same uses, and for other purposes.
Whitbread's Estate Act 1798	38 Geo. 3. c. 69 Pr.	21 June 1798
An act to confirm the renunciation and release of James Gordon, esquire, as one of the devisees, in trust, of Samuel Whitbread, esquire, deceased, and to give powers of sale and exchange over the settled and devised estates late of the said Samuel Whitbread, and power of changing and appointing new trustees of the same estates, and also power of granting building leases of certain parts thereof.
Starkie's Estate Act 1798	38 Geo. 3. c. 70 Pr.	21 June 1798
An act for allowing timber to be cut upon the settled estates of Le Gendre Pierce Starkie, esquire, and applying the money to arise therefrom in the purchase of other estates, to be settled to the same uses, and allowing conveyances in fee, and leases for long terms of years, to be made of part of such settled estates, for the purpose of building.
Mordaunt's Estate Act 1798	38 Geo. 3. c. 71 Pr.	21 June 1798
An act for vesting the fee simple of certain estates, devised by the will of Sir John Mordaunt deceased, in the right honourable Charles Henry earl of Peterborough and Monmouth, in lieu of other estates settled to the uses of the said will.
Thurcaston Inclosure Act 1798	38 Geo. 3. c. 72 Pr.	21 June 1798
An act for dividing, allotting, and enclosing, all the open and common fields, meadows, pastures, and commonable grounds and places, within the parish of Thurcaston, in the county of Leicester.
Swithland Inclosure Act 1798	38 Geo. 3. c. 73 Pr.	21 June 1798
An act for dividing, allotting, and enclosing, the open and common fields, meadows, pastures, and commonable grounds and places, within the parish of Swithland, in the county of Leicester.
Mavis Enderby Inclosure Act 1798	38 Geo. 3. c. 74 Pr.	21 June 1798
An act for dividing, allotting, and enclosing, the open common fields, common meadows, and other commonable lands and grounds, in the parish of Mavis Enderby, in the county of Lincoln.
Sutton Veny Inclosure Act 1798	38 Geo. 3. c. 75 Pr.	21 June 1798
An act for dividing and allotting, in severalty, the open and common fields and downs, common meadows, common pastures, and commonable places, within, or belonging to, the parish of Sutton Veny, in the county of Wilts.
Hartington Inclosure Act 1798	38 Geo. 3. c. 76 Pr.	21 June 1798
An act for dividing and enclosing the common and open fields, mesne inclosures, commons, and waste lands, within the manor and parish of Hartington, in the county of Derby.
Long Stow Inclosure Act 1798	38 Geo. 3. c. 77 Pr.	21 June 1798
An act for dividing, allotting, and enclosing, the open and common fields, common pastures, common meadows, and other commonable lands and waste grounds, within the parish of Long Stow, in the county of Cambridge.
Stone Inclosure Act 1798	38 Geo. 3. c. 78 Pr.	21 June 1798
An act for dividing and enclosing certain common fields, in the parish of Stone, in the county of Stafford, called Stone Field and The Sandpits.
Glastonbury Inclosure Act 1798	38 Geo. 3. c. 79 Pr.	21 June 1798
An act for dividing, allotting, and enclosing, a certain parcel or tract of commonable ground, formerly part of Queen or Little Sedgmoor, in the parish of Saint John the Baptist, in Glastonbury, and also certain parcels of waste land in the said parish, and in the parish of Saint Benedict, in Glastonbury, all in the county of Somerset.
Caddington Inclosure Act 1798	38 Geo. 3. c. 80 Pr.	21 June 1798
An act for dividing and enclosing the open and common fields, commons and waste lands, in the parish of Caddington, in the counties of Bedford and Hertford.
Swaffham Bulbeck Inclosure Act 1798	38 Geo. 3. c. 81 Pr.	21 June 1798
An act for dividing, allotting, enclosing, draining, and laying in severalty, the common and open fields, common meadows, commonable land, commons, heaths, and waste grounds, within the parish of Swaffham Bulbeck, in the county of Cambridge.
Warboys Inclosure Act 1798	38 Geo. 3. c. 82 Pr.	21 June 1798
An act for amending so much of an act, passed in the thirty-fifth year of the reign of his present Majesty, intituled, "An act for dividing, enclosing, and draining, the open common fields, common pastures, commonable and waste lands, and fen lands, within the manor and parish of Warboys, in the county of Huntingdon," (Note: Warboys Inclosure Act 1795 (35 Geo. 3. c. 108 Pr.)) as relates to the lands or grounds thereby directed to be set out and allotted in lieu of tythes.
Giesler's Naturalization Act 1798	38 Geo. 3. c. 83 Pr.	21 June 1798
An act for naturalizing Carl Friedrich Giesler.
Kirk Deighton Rectory and Thomas Thornton's Estates Act 1798	38 Geo. 3. c. 84 Pr.	28 June 1798
An act to establish and confirm an exchange made by and between the rector of the parish church of Kirk Deighton and Thomas Thornton, esquire, of part of his glebe lands, for other lands there, the property of the said Thomas Thornton, which are more conveniently situated for the said rector, and his successors.
Hyde's Estate Act 1798	38 Geo. 3. c. 85 Pr.	28 June 1798
An act for vesting certain messuages and lands at Charlton Row and Grindlow, in the county of Lancaster, in the guardians of John Hyde, esquire, an infant, the only son and residuary legatee named in the last will and testament of Nathan Hyde, esquire, deceased, in trust, to contract with Holland Ackers, esquire, for the sale of, and to convey the same to him upon the terms mentioned and specified in a certain contract made by the said Nathan Hyde with the said Holland Ackers, and in case the said Holland Ackers shall not be willing to enter into such contract, then to contract with any other person or persons for the sale of, and to convey the same together, not in parcels, to such person or persons, upon the same or better terms.
Hoolboom's Naturalization Act 1798	38 Geo. 3. c. 86 Pr.	28 June 1798
An act for naturalizing James Ecbert Hoolboom.
Brodum's Naturalization Act 1798	38 Geo. 3. c. 87 Pr.	28 June 1798
An act for naturalizing William Brodum, doctor of physick.
Holwhede's Naturalization Act 1798	38 Geo. 3. c. 88 Pr.	28 June 1798
An act for naturalizing John Frederick Holwhede.

=== Sources ===
- Pickering, Danby, ed. (1797). "Anno regni tricesimo octavo Georgii III". The Statutes at Large. Vol. 41. pp. 534–964 – via Google Books.
- Pickering, Danby, ed. (1797). "Anno regni tricesimo octavo Georgii III". The Statutes at Large. Vol. 41. pp. 681–942 – via Google Books.
- Journals of the House of Commons. Vol. 53. London: His Majesty's Stationery Office. 1803. pp. 172–709 – via Google Books.
- Chronological Table of and Index to the Statutes. Vol. 1: To the End of the Session 59 Vict. Sess. 2 (1895) (13th ed.). London: Her Majesty's Stationery Office. 1896. pp. 162–163 – via Google Books.

== 39 Geo. 3 ==
The third session of the 18th Parliament of Great Britain, which met from 20 November 1798 until 17 July 1799.

This session was also traditionally cited as 39 G. 3.

=== Public general acts ===
Short title	Citation	Royal assent
Long title
Annuity to Lord Nelson, etc. Act 1798 (repealed)	39 Geo. 3. c. 1	17 December 1798
An act for settling and Securing a certain annuity on Horatio Nelson, lord Nelson, and the two next persons to whom the title of baron Nelson of the Nile, and of Burnham Thorpe, in the county of Norfolk, shall descend, in consideration of the eminent service performed by the said Horatio Nelson, lord Nelson, to his Majesty and the publick. (Repealed by Statute Law Revision Act 1871 (34 & 35 Vict. c. 116))
Duties upon Malt, etc. Act 1798 (repealed)	39 Geo. 3. c. 2	17 December 1798
An act for continuing and granting to his Majesty certain duties upon malt, mum, cyder, and perry, for the service of the year one thousand seven hundred and ninety-nine. (Repealed by Statute Law Revision Act 1871 (34 & 35 Vict. c. 116))
Duties on Pensions, etc. Act 1798 (repealed)	39 Geo. 3. c. 3	17 December 1798
An act for continuing and granting to his Majesty a duty on pensions, offices, and personal estates, in England, Wales, and the town of Berwick-upon-Tweed; and certain duties on sugar, malt, tobacco, and snuff, for the service of the year one thousand seven hundred and ninety-nine. (Repealed by Statute Law Revision Act 1871 (34 & 35 Vict. c. 116))
Army and Navy Act 1798 (repealed)	39 Geo. 3. c. 4	17 December 1798
An act further to continue, until the expiration of six weeks after the commencement of the next session of parliament, an act, passed in the session of parliament holden in the thirty-sixth and thirty-seventh years of his present Majesty, chapter seventy, (Note: Incitement to Mutiny Act 1797 (37 Geo. 3. c. 70)) videlicet, On the sixth day of June one thousand seven hundred and ninety-seven, for the better prevention and punishment of attempts to seduce persons serving in his Majesty's forces, by sea or land, from their duty and allegiance to his Majesty, or to incite them to mutiny or disobedience. (Repealed by Statute Law Revision Act 1871 (34 & 35 Vict. c. 116))
Militia (No. 5) Act 1798 (repealed)	39 Geo. 3. c. 5	20 December 1798
An act to continue, until the expiration of one month after the commencement of the next session of parliament, an act, passed in the last session of parliament, chapter sixty-six, videlicet, On the twenty-first day of June one thousand seven hundred and ninety-eight, intituled, "An act for empowering his Majesty for a time and to an extent to be limited, to accept the services of such parts of his militia forces in this kingdom as may voluntarily offer themselves to be employed in Ireland." (Note: Militia (No. 4) Act 1798 (38 Geo. 3. c. 66)) (Repealed by Statute Law Revision Act 1871 (34 & 35 Vict. c. 116))
Land Tax Redemption, etc. Act 1798 (repealed)	39 Geo. 3. c. 6	22 December 1798
An act to enlarge the time limited for the redemption of the land tax; and to explain and amend an act, made in the last session of parliament, intituled, "An act for making perpetual, subject to redemption and purchase in the manner therein stated, the several sums of money now charged in Great Britain as a land tax, for one year, from the twenty-fifth day of March one thousand seven hundred and ninety-eight." (Note: Land Tax Perpetuation Act 1798 (38 Geo. 3. c. 60)) (Repealed by Land Tax Redemption Act 1802 (42 Geo. 3. c. 116))
National Debt (No. 3) Act 1798 (repealed)	39 Geo. 3. c. 7	22 December 1798
An act for raising the sum of three millions by way of annuities. (Repealed by Statute Law Revision Act 1870 (33 & 34 Vict. c. 69))

=== Sources ===
- Pickering, Danby, ed. (1799). "Anno regni tricesimo nono Georgii III". The Statutes at Large. Vol. 42. Cambridge: J. Bentham. pp. 1–51 – via Google Books.
- Journals of the House of Commons. Vol. 54. London: His Majesty's Stationery Office. 1803. pp. 3–744 – via Google Books.
- Chronological Table of and Index to the Statutes. Vol. 1: To the End of the Session 59 Vict. Sess. 2 (1895) (13th ed.). London: Her Majesty's Stationery Office. 1896. pp. 165–166 – via Google Books.

== See also ==
- List of acts of the Parliament of Great Britain
