= Northam Bridge =

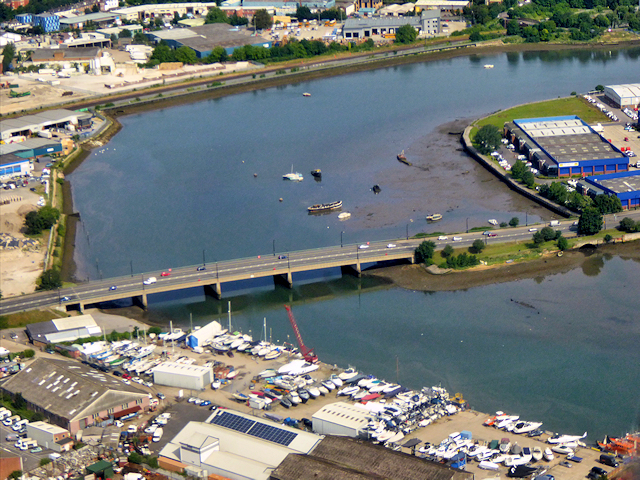
- Aerial view of the bridge in 2016
- Coordinates: 50.915°N 1.386°W
- Carries: 4 lanes (road)
- Crosses: River Itchen
- Locale: Northam, Bitterne Manor (both in Southampton)
- Maintained by: Southampton City Council
- Preceded by: St Denys Railway Bridge
- Followed by: Itchen Bridge

Characteristics
- Total length: 148 metres (485 ft 7 in)
- Width: 13.5 metres (44 ft 3 in)
- Longest span: 32 metres (105 ft 0 in)
- No. of spans: 5
- Piers in water: 4
- Clearance above: open-air
- Clearance below: 9.2 meters (30 ft 2.2 in)

History
- Construction start: 1796 (original); 1954 (current)
- Construction end: 1799 (original); 1954 (current)
- Opened: 1799 (original); 1954 (current)

Location
- Interactive map of Northam Bridge

The Northam Bridge is a road bridge across the River Itchen in Southampton, England, linking the suburbs of Northam and Bitterne Manor. The current bridge was the first major prestressed concrete road bridge to be built in the United Kingdom. The bridge carries the A3024 road as a dual carriageway, with two lanes on each carriageway.

== History ==
Prior to the construction of the Northam Bridge, the southernmost bridge across the River Itchen was at Mansbridge. Mansbridge was the lowest crossing point of the river until the early 18th century, when the Itchen Ferry began operating between Woolston and St Mary's, downriver of Northam.

The Northam Bridge was the idea of David Lance, who acquired land in Bitterne and built Chessel House there in 1796. Realising that access to his land was poor, he encouraged the building of a bridge linking Bitterne Manor to Northam, together with roads from the bridge to Botley and a further bridge over the River Hamble in Bursledon (and onwards to Portsmouth), with the fork between the Bursledon and Botley roads passing close to Chessel House. The Northam Bridge Company was formed in 1796, funded mainly by Portsmouth businessmen.

Northam Bridge and Approaches Act 1796
- Act of Parliament
- Parliament of Great Britain
- Long title: An act for building a bridge over the river Itchin, at or near Northam, within the liberties of the town, and county of the town of Southampton, and for making a road from the said town to the said bridge, and from thence to communicate with the road leading from West End to Botley, in the county of Southampton.
- Citation: 36 Geo. 3. c. 94
- Territorial extent: Great Britain

Dates
- Royal assent: 14 May 1796
- Commencement: 14 May 1796 (Note: The Acts of Parliament (Commencement) Act 1793.)
- Repealed: 3 August 1928
Other legislation
Amended by	Northam Bridge and Approaches Act 1798
Repealed by	Southampton Corporation Act 1928

Status: Repealed

Text of statute as originally enacted

Northam Bridge and Approaches Act 1798
- Act of Parliament
- Parliament of Great Britain
- Long title: An Act to alter and enlarge the Powers of an Act, passed in the thirty sixth Year of the Reign of His present Majesty, intituled "An Act for building a Bridge over the River Itchin, at or near Northam, within the Liberties of the Town and County of the Town of Southampton, and for making a Road from the said Town to the said Bridge, and from thence to communicate with the Road leading from West End to Botley, in the County of Southampton."
- Citation: 38 Geo. 3. c. lxiv
- Territorial extent: Great Britain

Dates
- Royal assent: 21 June 1798
- Commencement: 21 June 1798
- Repealed: 3 August 1928
Other legislation
Amends	Northam Bridge and Approaches Act 1796
Repealed by	Southampton Corporation Act 1928

Status: Repealed

Text of statute as originally enacted

The new route between Portsmouth and Southampton would be four miles (6 km) shorter than travelling via Mansbridge, and as a result the proposal to improve transport between the two important port cities was keenly supported by the Admiralty, especially since this was the time of the Napoleonic Wars. Consequently, when the Northam Bridge Company sought an act of Parliament to build a bridge, the Northam Bridge and Approaches Act 1796 (36 Geo. 3. c. 94) was passed quickly.

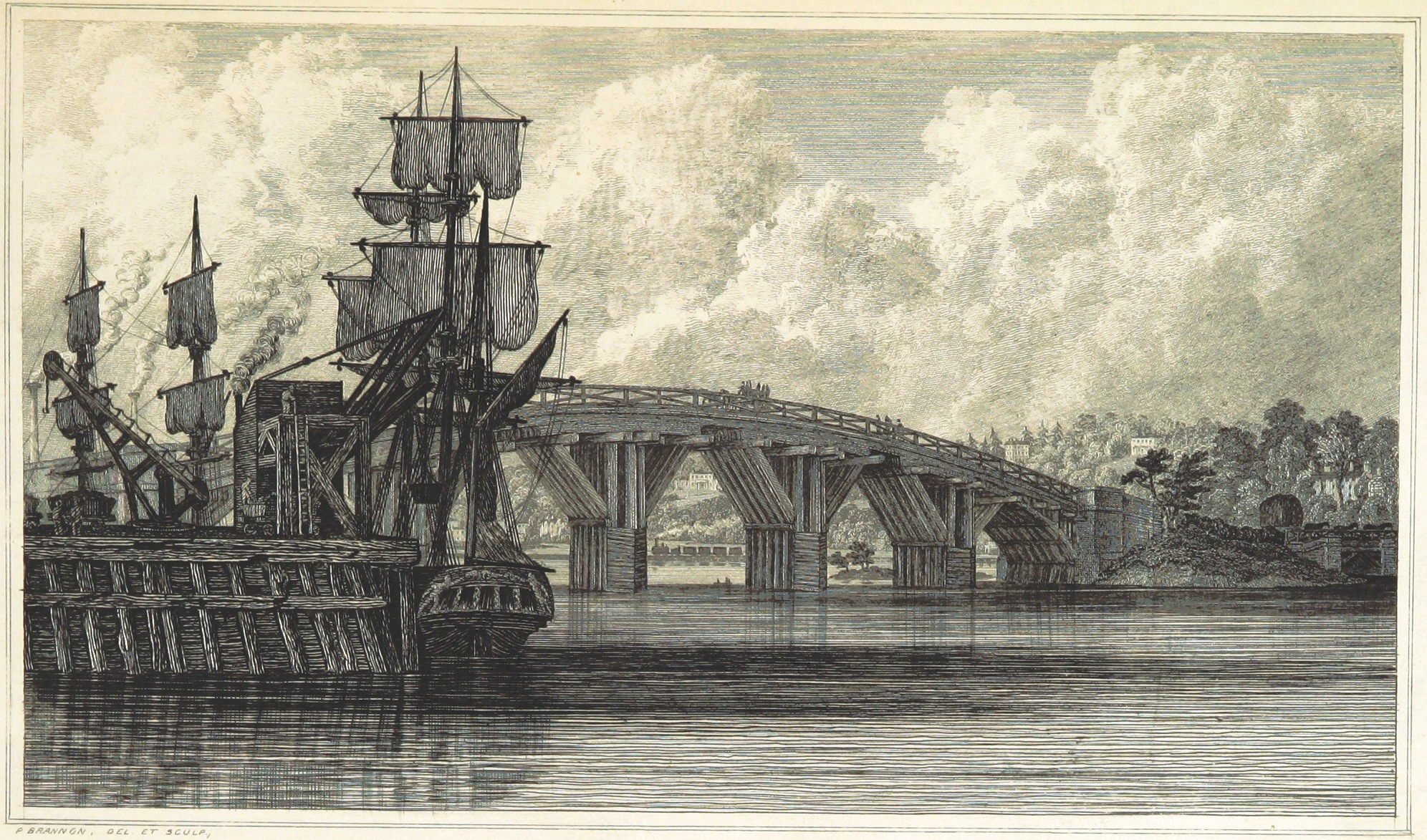
The 1799 Northam Bridge

Company of Proprietors of Northam Bridge and Roads Act 1847
- Act of Parliament
- Parliament of the United Kingdom
- Long title: An Act for vesting in the Company of Proprietors of Northam Bridge and Roads certain Lands in the Town and County of Southampton, and in the County of Southampton, and for empowering them to sell the same.
- Citation: 10 & 11 Vict. c. 24 Pr.
- Territorial extent: United Kingdom

Dates
- Royal assent: 22 July 1847
- Commencement: 22 July 1847
- Repealed: 3 August 1928
Other legislation
Repealed by	Southampton Corporation Act 1928

Status: Repealed

The new roads and bridges were built in 1799, and were originally operated as toll roads. The first Northam Bridge was of wooden construction.

The Northam Bridge Company spent 1834 and 1885 putting much effort into opposing first the construction of a swing bridge further down the Itchen and then construction of the Woolston Floating Bridge. In the case of the former they were successful; in the latter they were not. The Northam Bridge company responded to the opening of the Woolston Floating Bridge by reducing their tolls by three quarters.

The wooden Northam Bridge was replaced in 1889 by an iron bridge at a cost of £9,000.

The bridge remained a toll bridge until 1929 when the ownership was transferred from the private sector to the Southampton Corporation under the Southampton Corporation Act 1928 (18 & 19 Geo. 5. c. cviii). The bridge cost the council £79,238 after arbitration. It was this change of ownership that allowed the first bus route across the River Itchen to be established in Southampton; Southampton Corporation decided against extending the existing tram lines across the bridge, opting instead to establish a double-decker bus service. On 18 March 1941 the bridge was damaged during an air raid.

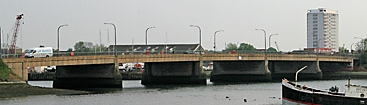
The modern bridge from the eastern (Bitterne Manor) bank

The iron bridge was replaced in 1954 with a third bridge, made of prestressed concrete, and it is this bridge that still stands today. The third Northam Bridge was the first major prestressed concrete road bridge to be built in the UK and cost £600,000. However this figure included the compulsory purchase of land and about 2,000 feet (610 m) of embankment construction as well as the bridge construction itself.

In January 2015 the bridge was partially closed to allow waterproofing work to be carried out at a cost of £1.2 million as part of a national £317 million programme of works dubbed the "pinch-point programme".

== Construction and dimensions ==
The parapets of the first (wooden) bridge were 24 feet (7.3 m) apart, as were those of its wrought-iron successor.

The third bridge utilised the latest technology available at the time but the style of the bridge was of the pre-war era. The main deck structure has transverse diaphragms and narrowly spaced beams, which were pre-cast on site using deflected cables. Pre-cast, pre-stressed slabs, known as junction slabs or continuity slabs, were placed between the tops of the beams by transverse stressing over a length where the flanges of the tees were removed. These, together with in situ diaphragms between the ends of the beams, allowed the deck structure to be made continuous for live and superimposed loads. After the junction slabs were in place, the main beams were post-tensioned through the diaphragms.

The cement used to make the concrete in the bridge was Ordinary Portland Cement, which was both cheaper and resulted in less shrinkage than using rapid-hardening cement. It was used in a ratio of 1:1 1/2:3 – a mix which used more cement than German and British practice at the time – and a water-to-cement ratio of 0.3.

The consulting engineers responsible for the new bridge were Rendel Palmer & Tritton, the same firm used for Waterloo Bridge in London nine years earlier.

At mid-span, the bridge is 44 feet 4 inches (13.51 m) wide, 4.7 metres above mean high water springs and 9.2 metres above chart datum. The bridge is 148 metres long in total, and the supporting piers are up to 32 metres apart.

== Local legend ==
The bridge is reportedly haunted by the ghost of a soaking wet young girl. In a local variation of the classic vanishing hitchhiker urban legend the girl is picked up by police but vanishes from their car before they arrive at the address she has given. Later inquiries at the address reveal she has been dead for several months.
