= Southampton Corporation Act 1928 =

Act of the Parliament of the United Kingdom

Southampton Corporation Act 1928 (Note: Section 1(1).)
- Act of Parliament
- Parliament of the United Kingdom
- Long title: An Act to provide for the transfer to the mayor, aldermen and burgesses of the borough of Southampton of the undertakings of the company of Proprietors of the Northam Bridge and Roads, to authorise said mayor, aldermen and burgesses to purchase the undertakings of the Southampton and Itchen Floating Bridge and Roads Company and to construct a tramway and for other purposes.
- Citation: 18 & 19 Geo. 5. c. cviii
- Territorial extent: United Kingdom

Dates
- Royal assent: 3 August 1928
- Commencement: 3 August 1928 (Note: The Acts of Parliament (Commencement) Act 1793.)

Other legislation
- Amends: Northam Bridge and Approaches Act 1796
- Repeals/revokes: Northam Bridge and Approaches Act 1798
- Amended by: Southampton Corporation Act 1931; Hampshire Act 1983

Status: Amended

Text of statute as originally enacted

The Southampton Corporation Act 1928 (18 & 19 Geo. 5. c. cviii) was an act of the Parliament of the United Kingdom that allowed the Southampton Corporation, now the city council, to acquire the running of both the Woolston Floating Bridge, as well as the Northam Bridge. The act also permitted the expansion of the Southampton Corporation Tramways, along Burgess Road. Finally, the act allowed the corporation to undertake the necessary borrowing to fund these projects.

The passing of the Southampton Corporation Act 1931 (21 & 22 Geo. 5. c. xcix) would later provide the precise figures for the cost of the acquisition of the Woolston Ferry.
