= Ford Transit =

Range of light commercial vehicles produced by Ford

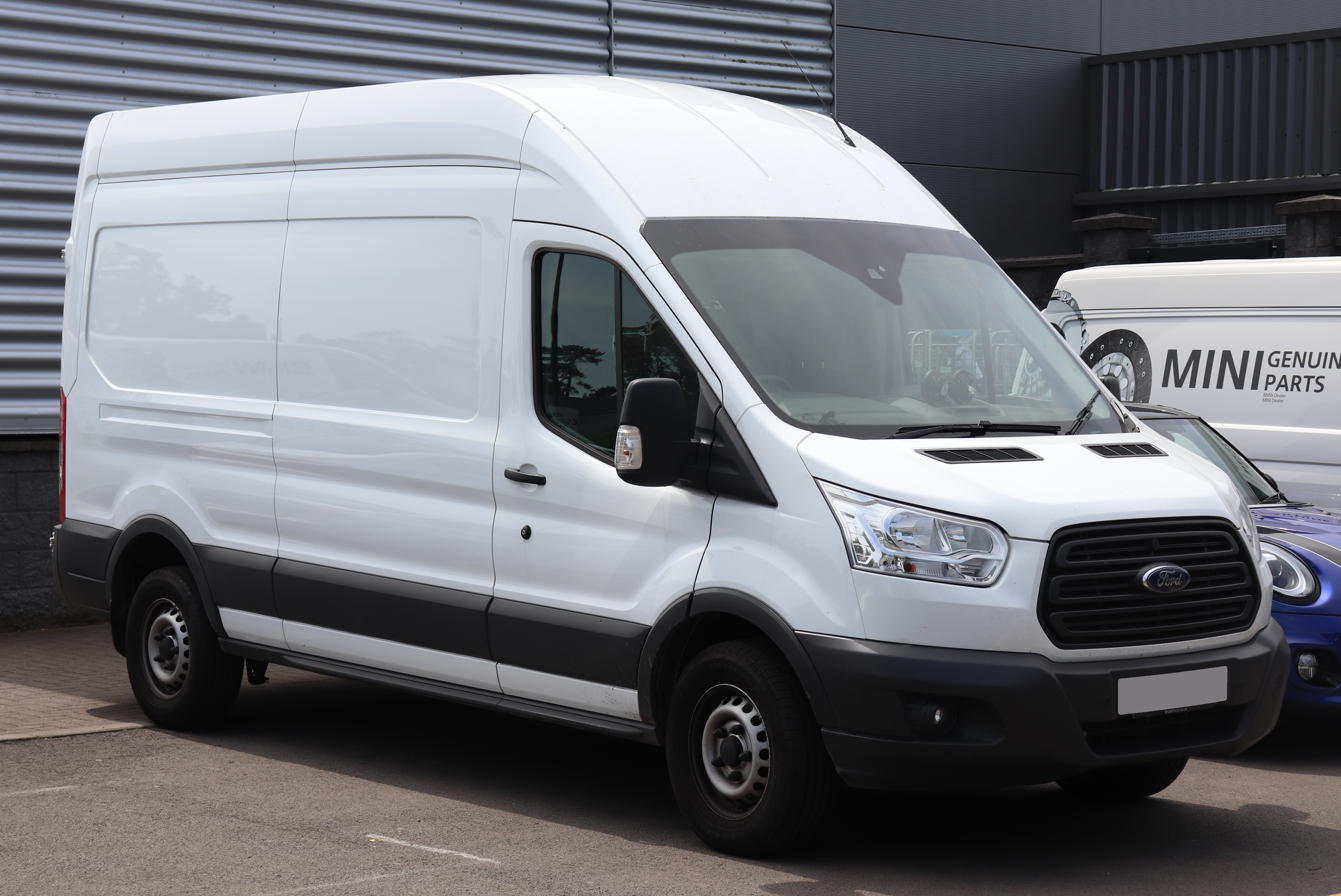

Overview
- Manufacturer: Ford
- Production: 1965–present
- Model years: 2015–present (North America)

Body and chassis
- Class: Light commercial vehicle (M)
- Layout: Front-engine, rear-wheel-drive (1953–present); Front-engine, front-wheel-drive (2000–present); Front-engine, four-wheel-drive (1977–1986, 2000–present)

Powertrain
- Engine: 3.5L Ecoboost V6, 3.5L Cyclone V6
- Transmission: 10-speed Automatic Transmission

Chronology
- Predecessor: Europe: Ford Thames 400E; North America: Ford E-Series
- Successor: Ford Transit Custom (for Ford Tourneo)

The Ford Transit is a family of light commercial vehicles manufactured by the Ford Motor Company since 1965, primarily as a cargo van, but also available in other configurations including a large passenger van (marketed as the Ford Tourneo in some markets since 1995), minibus, cutaway van chassis, and a pickup truck. The vehicle is also known as the Ford T-Series (T-150, T-250, T-350), a nomenclature shared with Ford's other light commercial vehicles, the Ford F-Series trucks, and the Ford E-Series chassis. As of 2015, 8 million Transit vans have been sold, making it the third best-selling van of all time and has been produced across four basic platform generations (debuting in 1965, 1986, 2000, and 2013 respectively), with various "facelift" versions of each.

The first product of the merged Ford of Europe, the Transit was originally marketed in Western Europe and Australia. By the end of the twentieth century, it was marketed nearly globally with the exception of North America until 2015 when it replaced the Ford E-Series van. Upon its introduction in North America, the Transit quickly became the best-selling van of any type in the United States, minivan sales included.

That mirrors the success the Transit has achieved in Europe, where it has been the best-selling light commercial vehicle for forty years, and in some countries the term "Transit" has passed into common usage as a generic trademark applying to any light commercial van in the Transit's size bracket.

== Taunus Transit (1953) ==
Ford Taunus Transit
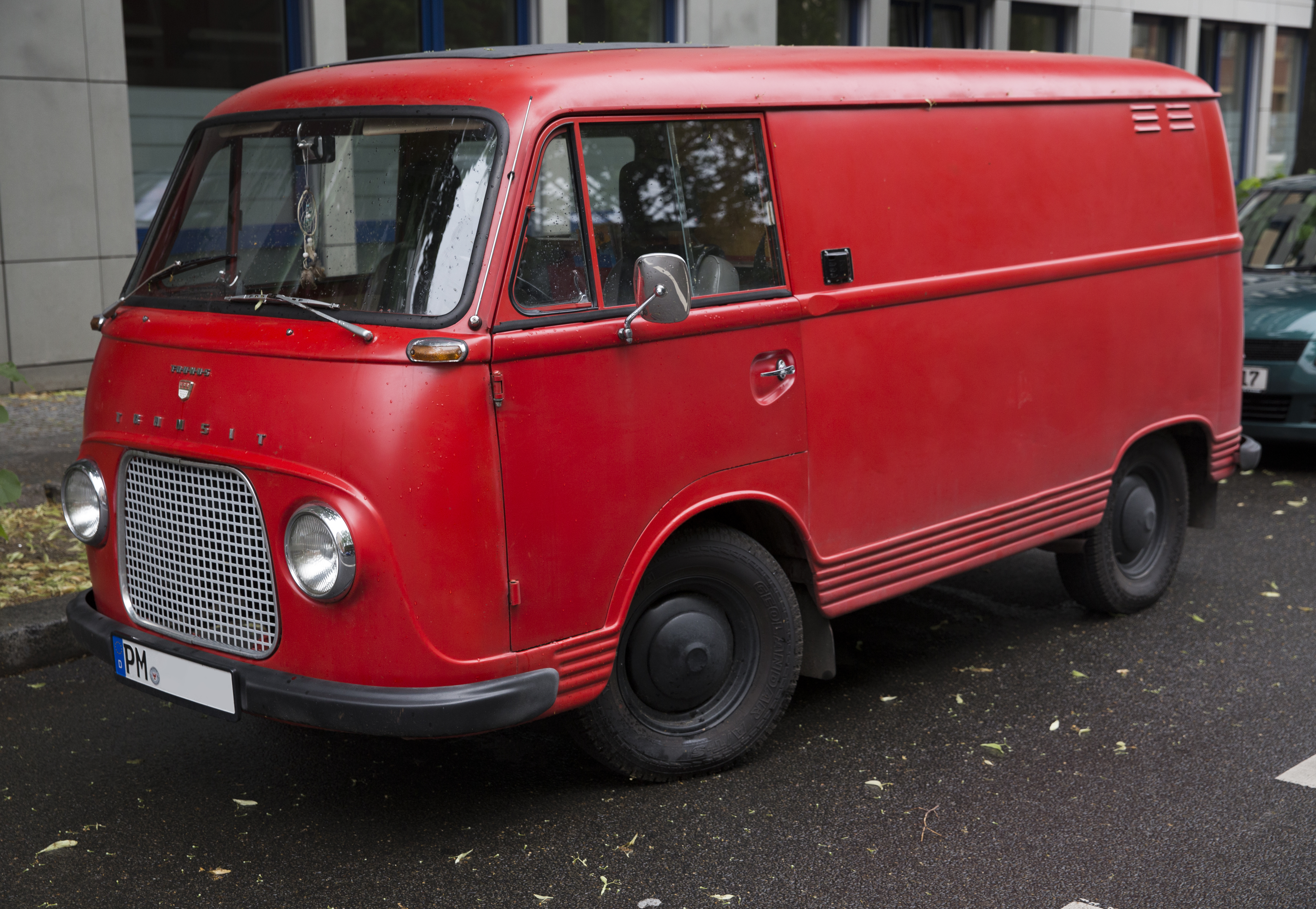
- 1965 Ford Taunus Transit

Overview
- Production: 1953–1965
- Assembly: West Germany: Cologne (Cologne Body & Assembly)

Body and chassis
- Body style: 3/4-door van
- Layout: FR layout

Powertrain
- Engine: 1.5 L I4
- Transmission: 4-speed manual

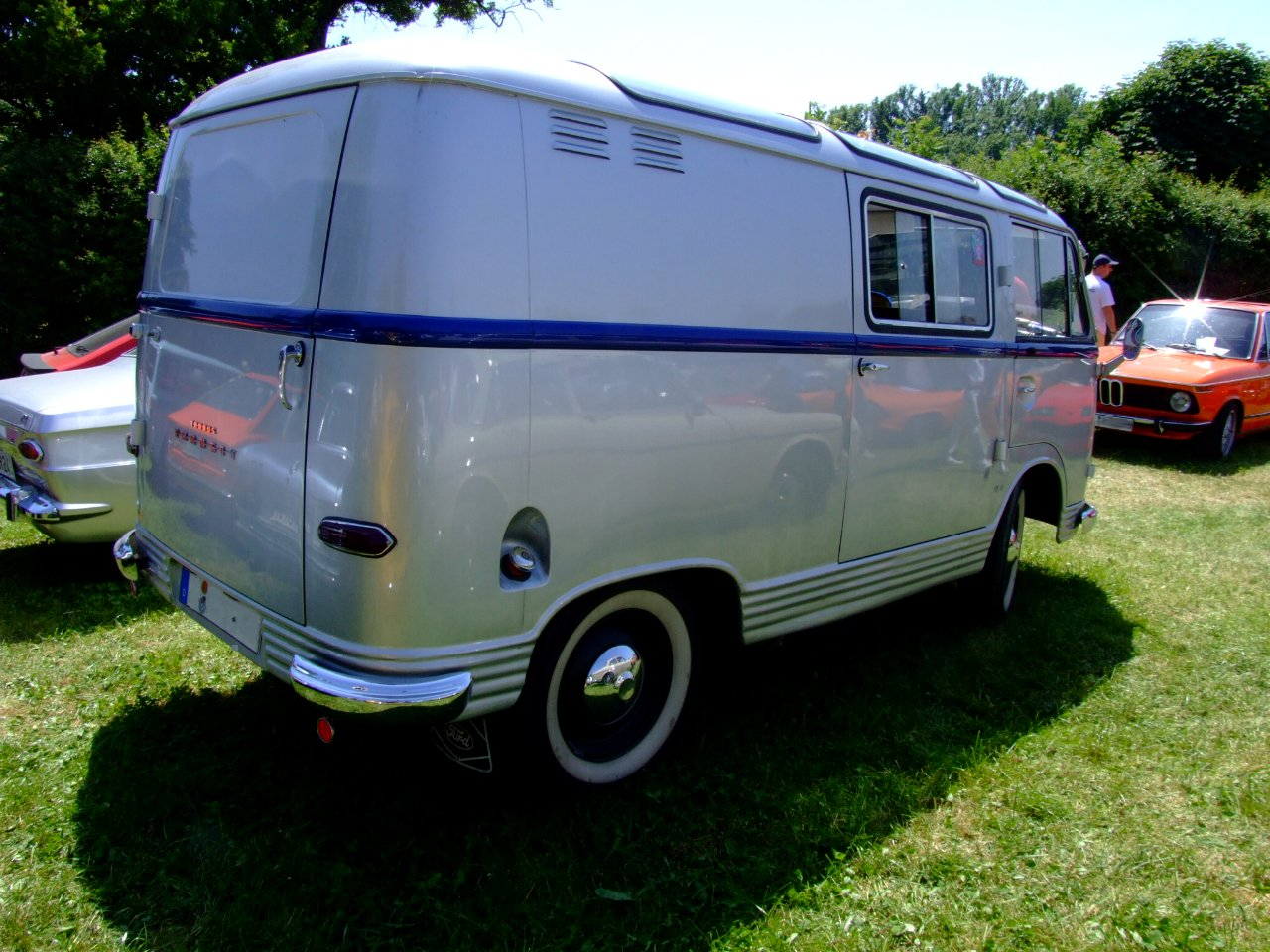
Ford Taunus Transit

Predecessor of the British and German-built Transit, the first production Ford to wear the "Transit" badge was a van built in Ford's Cologne plant in Germany. It was introduced in 1953 as FK 1000 (carrying 1,000 kg) with the 1.2-litre Ford sidevalve engine from the contemporary Taunus. In 1955 the engine capacity was enlarged to 1.5 litres. From 1961, this vehicle was called the Ford Taunus Transit. Production of this model ceased in 1965.

=== Brief historical view ===
On May 9, 1945, the day after the unconditional surrender of the German Wehrmacht in the Second World War, production at Ford Germany in Cologne resumed. Because the production of civilian cars in the British occupied zone was restricted, Ford-Werke AG was limited to the production of trucks until 1948. Those trucks were based on the slightly modified war models V 3000 S, B 3000 S and V 3000 A as they were already produced before and during the Second World War in the Ford production facilities in the Third Reich and subsequently called "Rhein" (V8-engined) and "Ruhr" (four-cylinder).

At that time neither Ford of Britain nor Ford Werke AG were 100% subsidiaries of Ford Motor Company in Detroit; before the Second World War each company had its own more or less protected market. After the war, several economical boundaries were abolished and local markets did not exist anymore in the same way that they existed before. With this, Ford of Britain and Ford-Werke AG suddenly became more competitive on the whole European Continent than local market subsidiaries of their parent company in Detroit.

Production of light commercial vehicles began in late 1948, when 148 half-ton delivery vehicles were built. In 1951 Ford Werke AG launched the commercial vehicle series FK, standing for Ford Köln, with different-sized vehicles (FK2000 with 2 tons payload, FK3000 with 3 tons payload, FK3500 with 3.5 tons payload, etc.). The FK series was successor of the "Rhein" and "Ruhr" trucks. In 1953, the FK series were rounded off with the light delivery van FK1000/FK1250 (1ton/1.25tons payload), in competition to the Volkswagen Type 2 VW Bus, the DKW Type F89L Schnellaster or the Tempo Matador.

As usual in the Anglo-Saxon countries in those days, Ford's marketing experts attached more importance to the model/series designation than to the "Ford" label as a brand. Most British Ford products carried no Ford emblem. The commercial vehicles produced at Ford-Werke AG were marketed with the FK logo, while the passenger cars produced from 1948 onwards were offered under the name Taunus referring to the re-produced pre-war model Ford Taunus G93A.

Due to continental European habits, the original series and model designations "FK" and Taunus mutated into real brands, each with its own emblem and different models, comparable with Daimler Benz Mercedes models or General Motors Opel models. The FK emblem consists of two slightly overlapping ovals with the "F" from the well-known Ford emblem in the first and a "K" in the same font in the second oval. The Taunus emblem first depicted the Cologne Cathedral; from 1953 on until its discontinuation in 1967, Cologne's city flag inspired the Taunus emblem.

In 1961, Ford discontinued the entire truck production in Germany and took the FK brand off the market, due to serious defects and therefore strongly decreasing demand. The unrelated FK1000/FK1250 van, unaffected by these defects, continued to sell well and was now offered under the successful Taunus brand with the model name Transit in addition to the cars Taunus 12M/15M and the Taunus 17M. A comparable program to Volkswagen, that offered its vehicles VW Beetle, VW 1500 and VW Bus the same way on the continental European market. The "new" Transit Taunus van was now labelled with the Transit model name (instead of the FK logo) in big chrome letters and a big "Taunus" emblem as well as a small Taunus lettering which was also mounted on the back of the vehicle. New, however, was a small Ford logo underneath the right B-pillar.

From 1957 onwards, with the launch of the Thames 400E by Ford of Britain, the situation arose that together with the FK1000/FK1250 by Ford Werke AG, the two subsidiaries began competing for the same continental European markets. For example, the British Ford Thames 400E was also assembled as a left-hand drive version in the Ford assembly plants in Copenhagen, Denmark, and the German FK1000 was also assembled in Azambuja, Portugal. In the French, Spanish, Italian, Swiss, Benelux and Scandinavian markets, both products were found. This turned out to be disadvantageous and cost-intensive especially after the fall of various trade barriers within the newly founded EEC.

For this reason, such a situation with internal competition and parallel developments was very unsatisfactory for the Ford headquarters in Detroit. The aim was to not only standardize the vehicle production (world car), but also merge the company structures in Europe. Under parent's dictate, Ford of Britain and Ford-Werke AG started the "Redcap-Project" in the commercial vehicle sector in 1963, from which the Ford Transit was launched in 1965, based on a new unified platform.

Two years later in 1967, Ford of Britain and Ford-Werke AG merged to Ford of Europe with the headquarters in Cologne, Germany. Ford Detroit forced the standardization of platforms and even model-names over the European market under the Ford brand and logo. After the Transit in 1965, a second unified platform (Escort) was launched in 1967. With the discontinuation of the Zephyr (British) and P7 (German) in 1972 all Ford platforms for the European market became unified. Since 1994 (discontinuation of the Granada name) even the Ford model-names are the same throughout the European market.

=== Naming system ===
The German vehicle was not widely exported, and the "Mark 1" tag has commonly been applied, retrospectively, to the 1965 to 1978 pan-European model (see below). Whilst there have only been four basic platforms since 1965, the various facelifts and upgrades over the years have been referred to using a conflicting range of "Mark" numbers, with some sources counting a facelift as a new "Mark", some not. Ford's own historical look back at Transit production, published for the launch of the 1994 model, avoids the issue by referring to generations of Transit by years produced. This article attempts to make mention of all the common naming systems.

== First generation (1965) ==
First generation
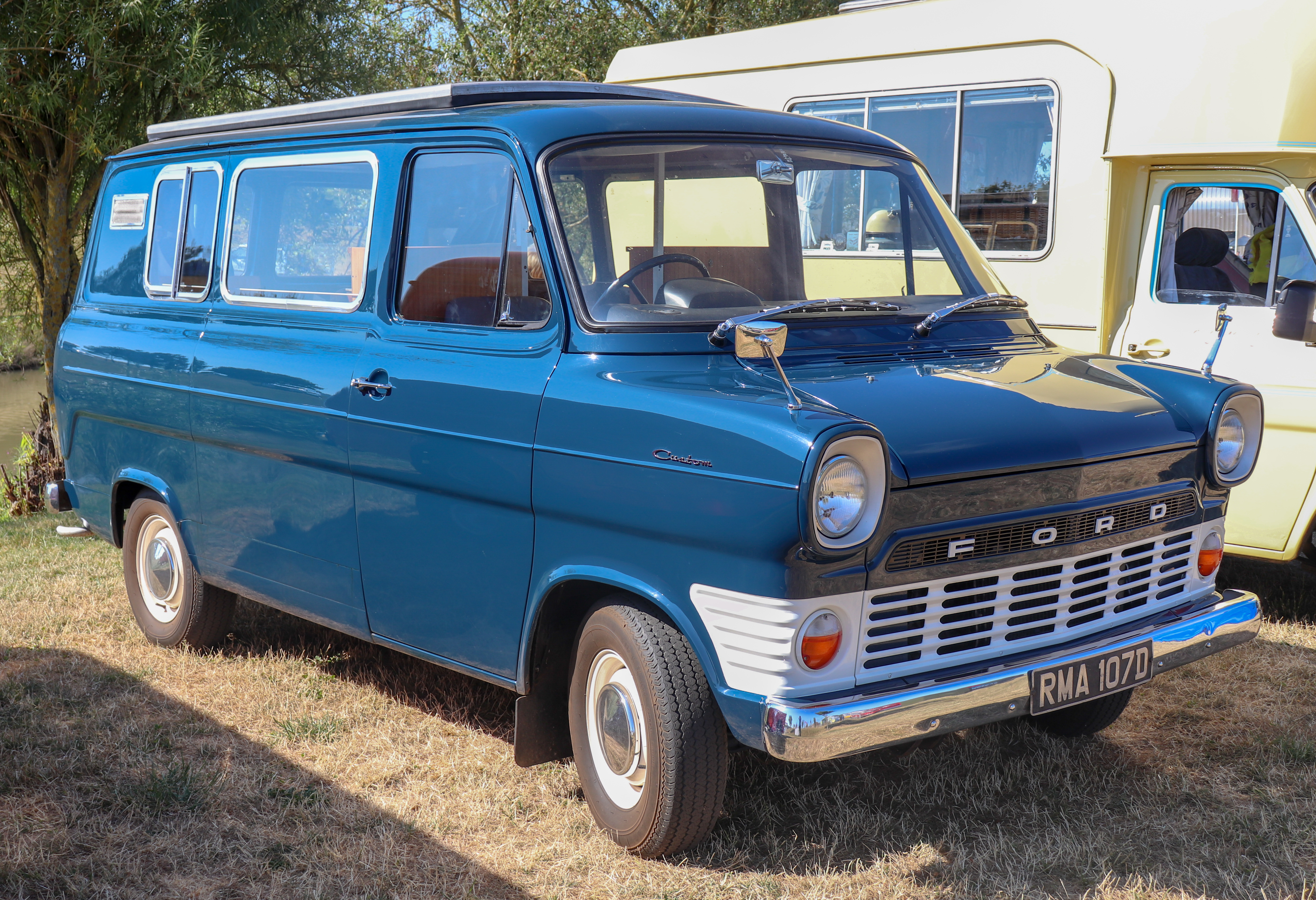
- 1966 Ford Transit Custom camper

Overview
- Production: 1965–1977
- Assembly: Belgium: Genk (Genk Body & Assembly); United Kingdom: Langley, Slough; United Kingdom: Southampton (Ford Southampton plant: 1972–1978); Australia: Homebush (1966–1972); Australia: Broadmeadows (from 1973); New Zealand: Seaview, Lower Hutt; Netherlands: Amsterdam; Turkey: Acıbadem, Üsküdar, Istanbul (Otosan: from 1967); South Africa: Port Elizabeth

Body and chassis
- Body style: 3/4-door van
- Layout: FR layout

Powertrain
- Engine: petrol; 1.3 L 1288 cc Taunus V4; 1.5 L 1498 cc Taunus V4; 1.7 L 1699 cc Taunus V4; 1.7 L 1663 cc Essex V4; 2.0 L 1996 cc Essex V4; 3.0 L 2994 cc Essex V6; 3.3 L 3277 cc 200 I6 (Australia: from 1973) diesel; 1.8 L 1760 cc Perkins 4.108 I4; 2.4 L 2359 cc York I4

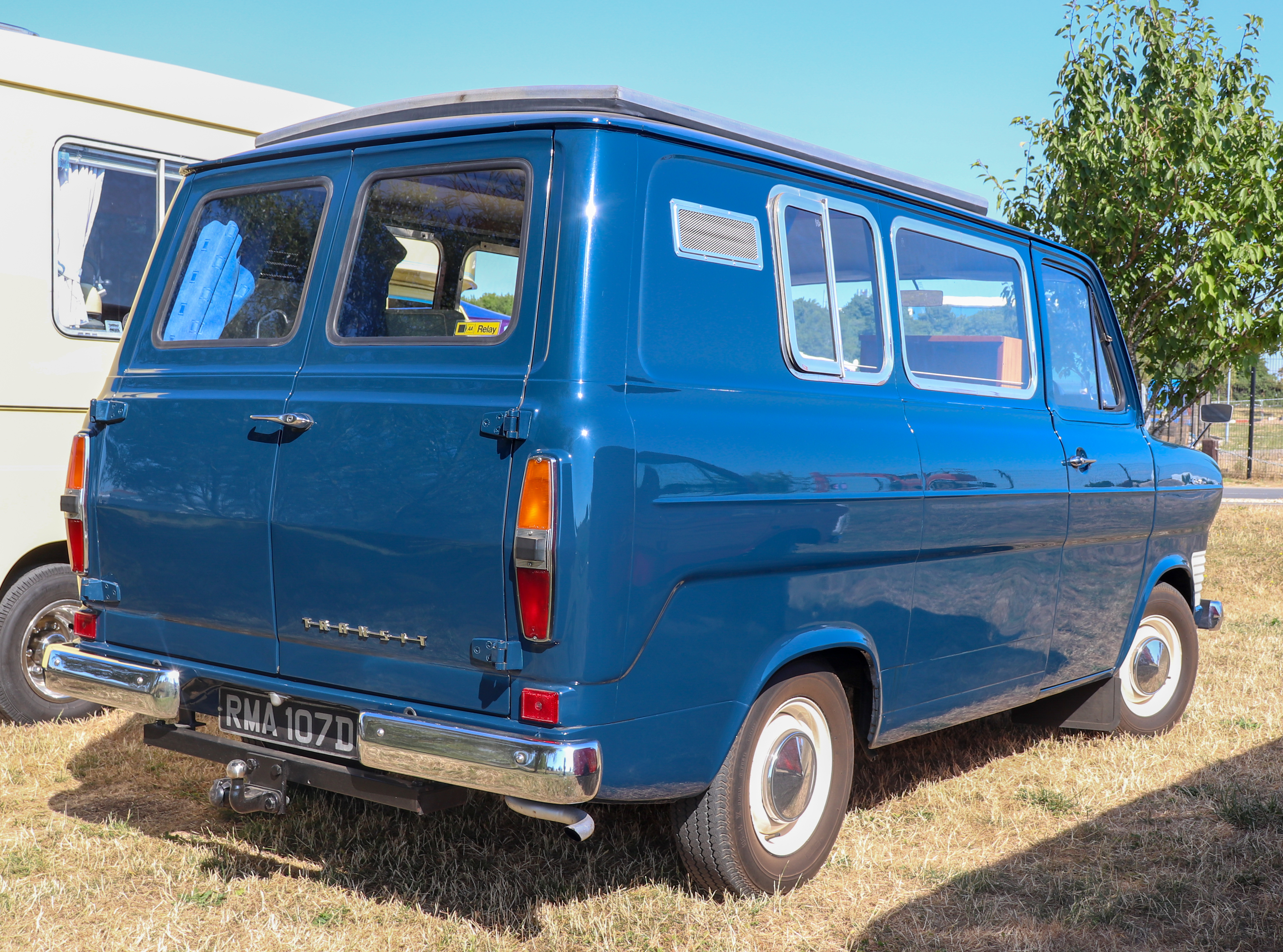
Ford Transit Custom

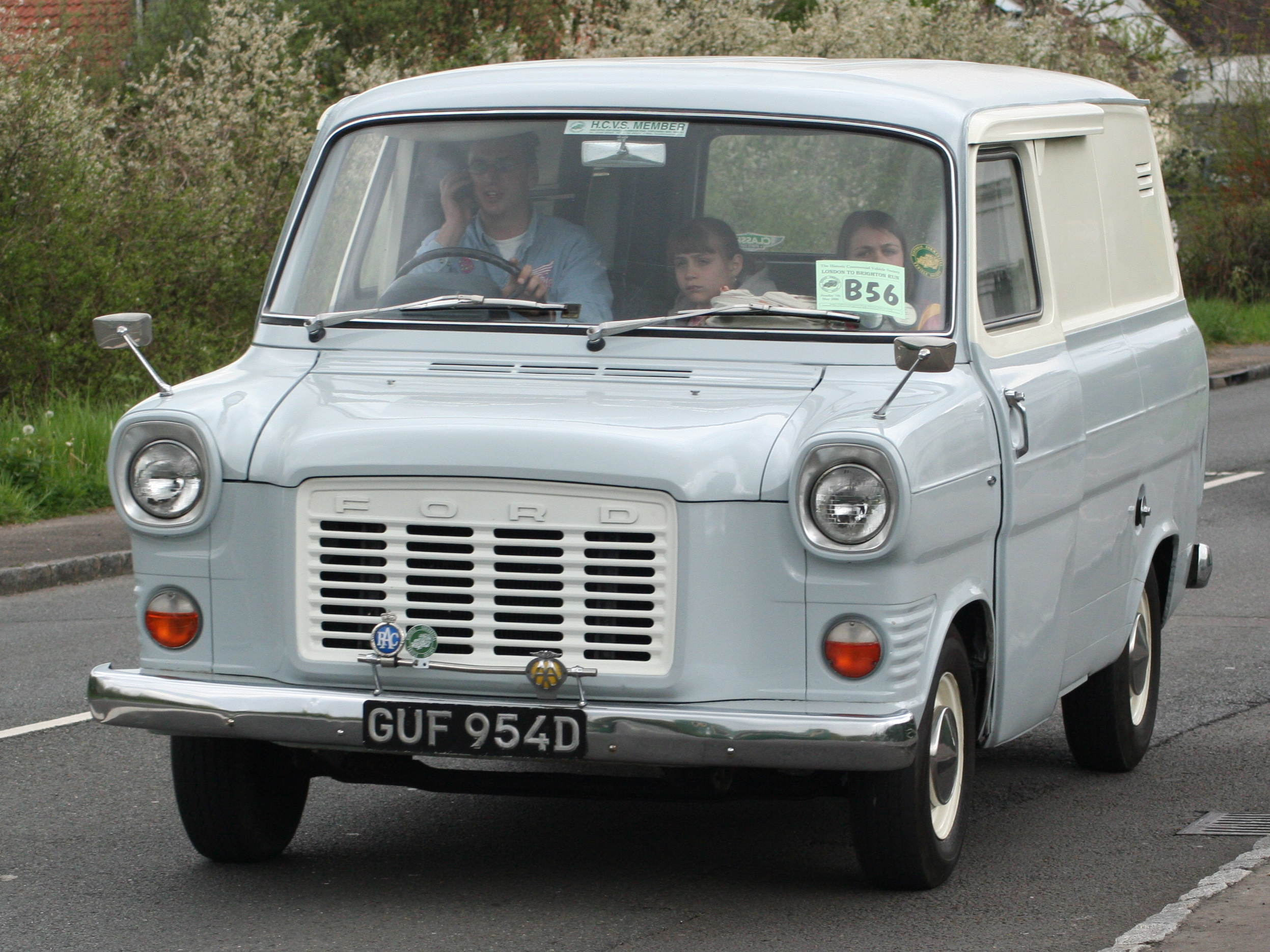
Ford Transit with revised nose and longer bonnet for Diesel and later V6 engines.

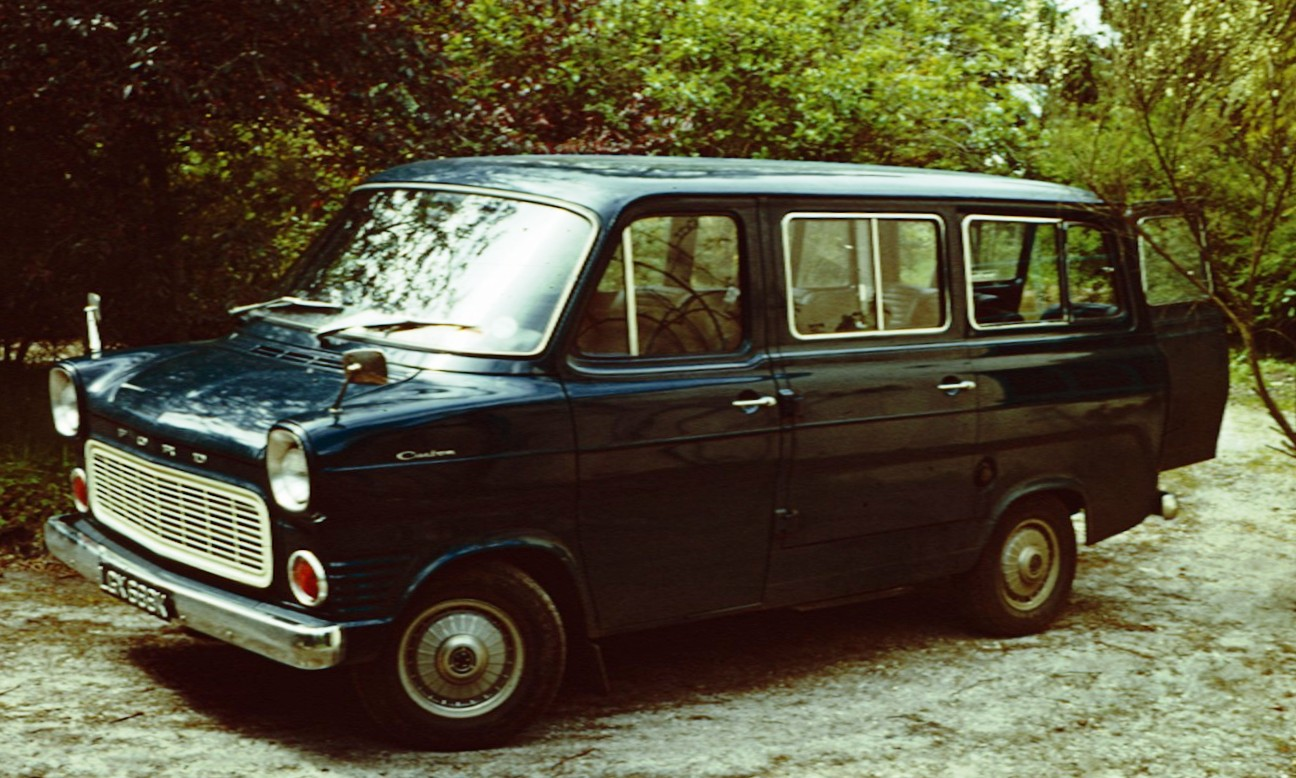
1971 facelift with rounded rectangular grille.

The first generation Transit, or the Transit Mark I in the United Kingdom, was introduced in October 1965, taking over directly from the Thames 400E. This generation had the longest production run of any Transit to date, staying largely unaltered for 12 years until the major update of 1977, with only one minor facelift for the 1971 model year, which saw updated front end styling on the V4 engined models (the 'pig snout' diesel/V6 models remained unchanged), and the introduction of a safety padded dashboard.

Overall production of this platform therefore lasted for over 20 years before finally being replaced by the all-new VE6 platform in 1986.

The van was produced initially at Ford's Langley facility in Berkshire, England (a former Second World War aircraft factory which had produced Hawker Hurricane fighters), but demand outstripped the capability of the plant, and production was moved to Southampton until closure in 2013 in favour of the factory at İzmit, Turkey.

Transits were also produced in Ford's Genk factory in Belgium and also Turkey. Transits were produced in Amsterdam for the local market from the mid-1970s until the end of 1981. The Amsterdam factory had ample capacity, since the Ford Transcontinental produced there had little success (total production of 8,000 in six years). Although the Transit sold well in the Netherlands, it was not enough to save the factory, which closed in December 1981.

The Transit was introduced to replace the Ford Thames 400E, a small mid-engined forward control van noted for its narrow track which was in competition with similar-looking but larger vehicles from the BMC J4 and J2 vans and Rootes Group's Commer PB ranges. In a UK market segment then dominated by the Bedford CA, the Thames' restricted load area failed to attract fleet users in sufficient numbers. Ford switched to a front-engined configuration, as did Bedford with their well-regarded CA series vans in the 1950s. Henry Ford II's revolutionary step was to combine the engineering efforts of Ford of Britain and Ford of Germany to create a prototype for the Ford of Europe of today—previously the two subsidiaries had avoided competing in one another's domestic markets but had been direct competitors in other European markets.

The Transit was a departure from the European commercial vehicles of the day with its American-inspired styling—its broad track gave it a huge advantage in carrying capacity over comparable vehicles of the day. Most of the Transit's mechanical components were adapted from Ford's car range of the time. Another key to the Transit's success was the sheer number of different body styles: panel vans in long and short wheelbase forms, pick-up truck, minibuses, crew-cabs to name but a few.

The engines used in the UK were the Essex V4 for the petrol-engined version in 1.7 L and 2.0 L capacities. By using relatively short V-4 engines Ford were able to minimise the additional length necessitated to place the engine ahead of the driver. Another popular development under the bonnet was the equipping of the van with an alternator at time when the UK market competitors expected buyers to be content with a dynamo. A 43 bhp (32 kW) diesel engine sourced from Perkins was also offered. As this engine was too long to fit under the Transit's stubby nose, the diesel version featured a longer bonnet - which became nicknamed as the "pig snout". The underpowered Perkins proved unpopular, and was replaced by Ford's own York unit in 1972. For mainland Europe the Transit had the German Ford Taunus V4 engine in Cologne 1.3, 1.5, and 1.7- or Essex 2.0-litre versions. The diesel version's long nose front was also used to accommodate the Ford 3.0 L Ford Essex V6 engine (UK) for high performance applications such as vans supplied to police and ambulance services. In Australia, in 1973, to supplement the two Essex V4 engines that were available the Transit was released with the long-nose diesel front used to accommodate an inline 6-cylinder engine derived from the Ford Falcon.

The Metropolitan Police reported in 1972 that "Transits are used in 95 per cent of bank raids. With the performance of a car, and space for 1.75 tonnes of loot, the Transit is proving to be the perfect getaway vehicle", describing it as "Britain's most wanted van".

The adoption of a front beam axle in place of a system incorporating independent front suspension that had featured on its UK predecessor might have been seen as a backward step by some, but on-the-road commentators felt that the Transit's wider track and longer wheelbase more than compensated for the apparent step backwards represented by Ford's suspension choices. Drivers appreciated the elimination of the excessive noise, smell and cabin heat that resulted from placing the driver above or adjacent to the engine compartment in the Thames 400E and other forward control light vans of the 1950s and early 1960s.

The Transit was also assembled in South Africa between 1967 and 1974, the last Transit to be sold in that country until 2013, when a fully imported model was introduced. In South Korea Hyundai, who had been using Ford technology for their automobiles, developed a light commercial vehicle called the HD1000 using the Transit's chassis and the Perkins diesel. It was only built between 1977 and 1981 as the South Korean automobile industry was reorganized, with Hyundai being restricted to passenger automobiles.

=== Facelift (1977) ===
First generation facelift "Mark II"
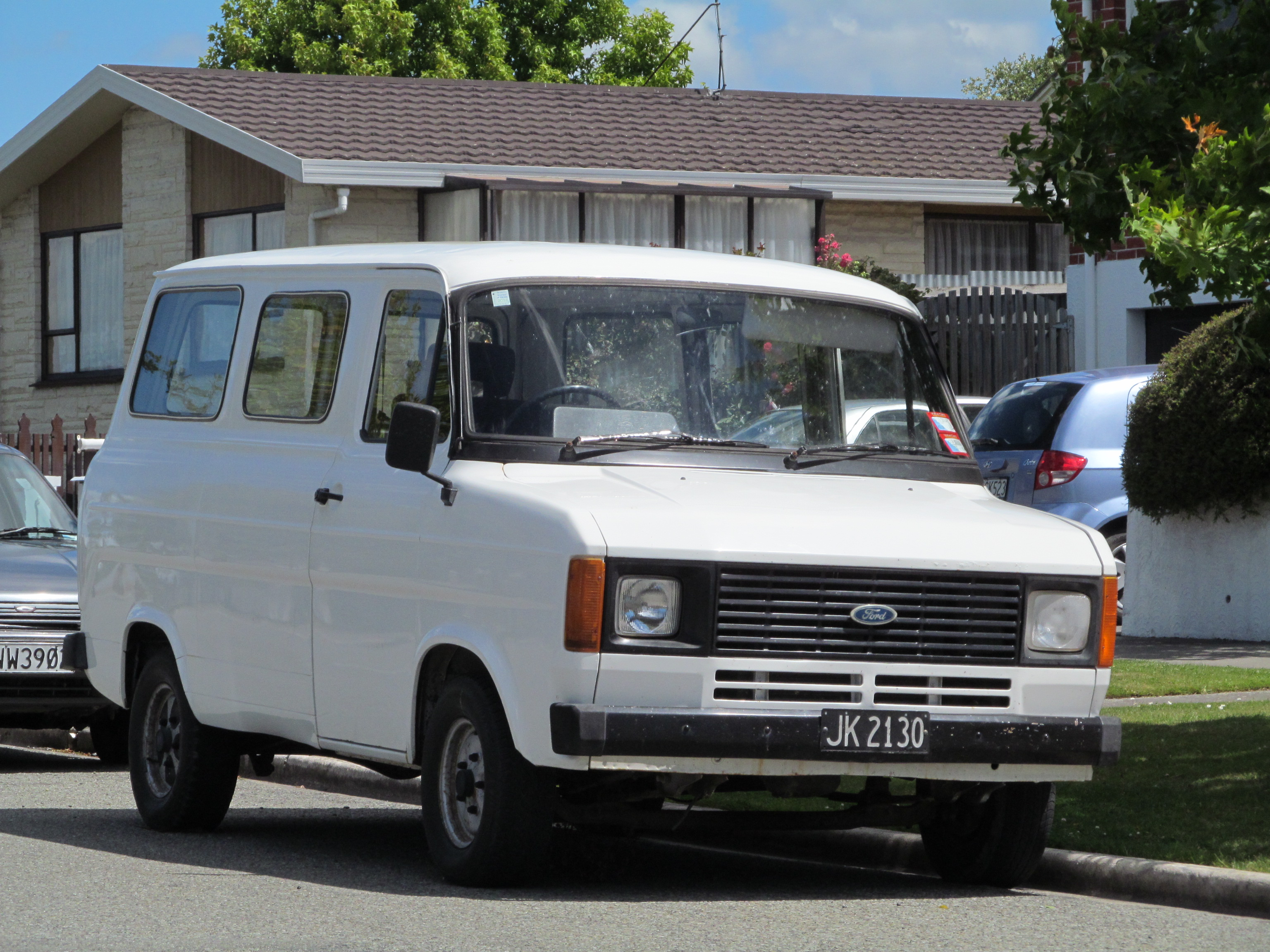

Overview
- Production: 1977–1986
- Assembly: Belgium: Genk (Genk Body & Assembly); United Kingdom: Southampton (Ford Southampton plant); Australia: Broadmeadows; Netherlands: Amsterdam (1975–1981); New Zealand: Seaview, Lower Hutt; Turkey: Acıbadem, Üsküdar, Istanbul (Ford Otosan)

Body and chassis
- Body style: 3/4-door van 2-door pickup 4-door minibus 4-door crew cab 2-door chassis cab 2-door Luton/box van
- Layout: FR layout; 4WD

Powertrain
- Engine: petrol; 1.6 L Kent/Crossflow I4; 1.6 L Pinto I4; 2.0 L Pinto I4; 2.8 L Cologne V6; 3.0 L Essex V6; 4.1 L 250 I6 (Australia); diesel; 2.4 L York I4; 2.5 L DI I4

Dimensions
- Wheelbase: SWB: 2,690 mm (105.9 in); LWB: 3,000 mm (118.1 in)

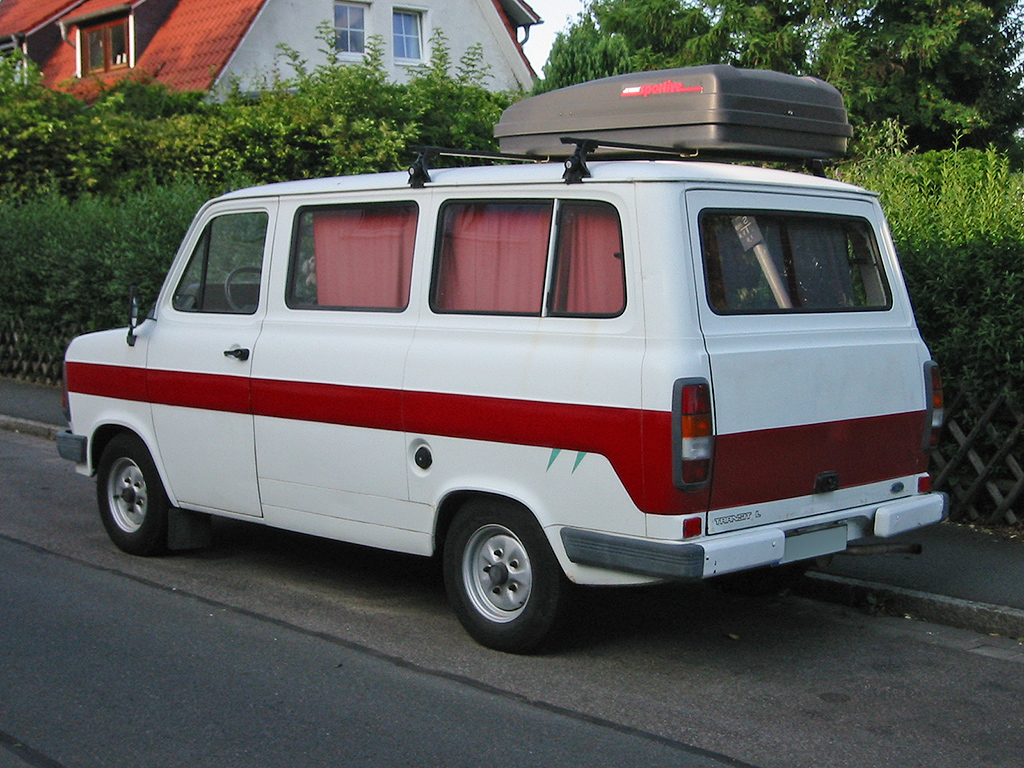
Ford Transit MKII

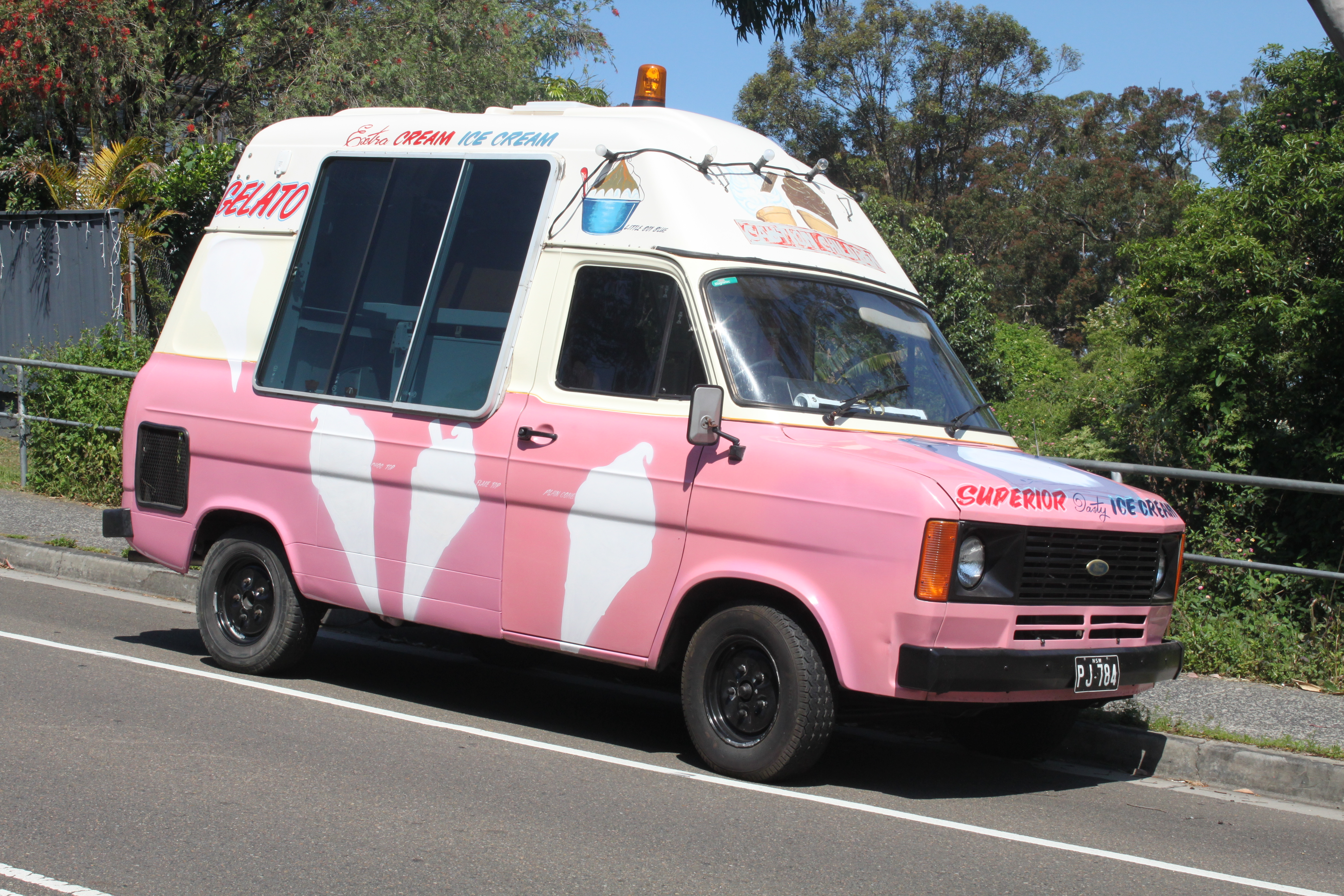
Ford Transit Ice cream van with the restyled longer bonnet

In August 1977, a facelifted version—codenamed within Ford as the "Transit 1978 1/2"—but usually referred to as the Transit Mark II, debuted with a restyled, longer nose section which could now properly accommodate an in-line engine in place of the Essex and Cologne V4s - therefore the Pinto engine from the Cortina became the Transit's dominant power unit. The new frontal styling brought the Transit back into line with the rest of Ford of Europe's passenger car range of the period with square headlamps and the black louvred grille, although the rear styling remained unaltered. The austere dashboard of the Mk1 with its single instrument binnacle was replaced with a full-width plastic fascia with a more comprehensive instrument cluster and switchgear taken from the Taunus/Cortina Mk4. Many fleet owners experienced premature camshaft wear in early Pinto units in the Cortina and for two years the Transit 75 was available with the 1.6 L Ford Kent cross-flow engine. High-performance versions intended for police or ambulance service used the 3.0 L V6 version of the Essex engine; the 100 hp (75 kW; 101 PS) 3.0 was also available in some heavier duty models like the 3.5-tonne Transit 190. From September 1978, Australian variants could be had with locally built 4.1 L (250 cu in) inline 6-cylinder engines.

In 1984, the York diesel engine was redesigned into the 2.5 L "DI" (direct injection) unit. At this time this generation received a minor facelift including a grey plastic front grille with integrated headlamp surrounds, wraparound indicators, longer bumper end caps and multifunction rear lights incorporating fog, indicator, reversing and side lights for the panel van. This facelift did not commonly result in a new "Mark" number.

The Mark II was available in 6 body styles: Van, Kombi, Chassis Cab, Parcel Van, Bus, and Crewbus all available in short-wheelbase (2690 mm) and long-wheelbase (3000 mm) versions. A selection of 5 engines was available: 1.6-litre OHC Petrol, 1.6-litre OHV Petrol (Kent), 2.0-litre OHC Petrol, 2.0-litre OHC Petrol (Economy) and 2.4-litre Diesel. On top of this were 32 door combinations, 6 axle ratios and options for 12 – 17 interior seats. All of these were available in any combination when purchased with Ford's highly customizable custom plan. At the time this gave the business sector an unprecedented amount of flexibility, which was a major factor in the vehicles' ultimate success.

In 1981, for mainland European market only, the Transit Clubmobil was introduced by the Hymer company. This was fitted with a 1.6 / 2.0 OHC engine, and featured a custom interior – captain style swivel seats in velour, pile carpet, motorsport steering wheel, unique Ronal 14" alloy wheels, unique side windows, folding back seat, luggage box, unique front spoiler, tinted glass, power assisted steering, spare wheel carrier and rear door ladder. In 3 years of production 150 were produced and less than 20 are thought to still exist.

In late 1982, the well-equipped Transit Ghia was introduced to some markets, only as a nine-seater bus. This offered a velour interior, full carpeting, tinted windows, and sunroof. Externally it can be identified by chrome dog-dish hubcaps and extra lamps in the grille.

In 1982, a four-wheel drive version was added to the German market, called the SIRA-Ford Transit. This was developed together with Rau GmbH, a Ford dealer in Stuttgart. "SIRA" combines "Sinpar" and "Rau" because Rau was the agent for French four-wheel-drive specialist Sinpar in Germany, Austria, and Switzerland. The SIRA Transit used a Sinpar transfer case and other parts, and was available with the 2-litre petrol or the 2.4-litre Diesel, on either wheelbase. The 4x4 Transit was later offered in other markets as well.

== Second generation (1986) ==
Second generation MK3, MK4 & MK5
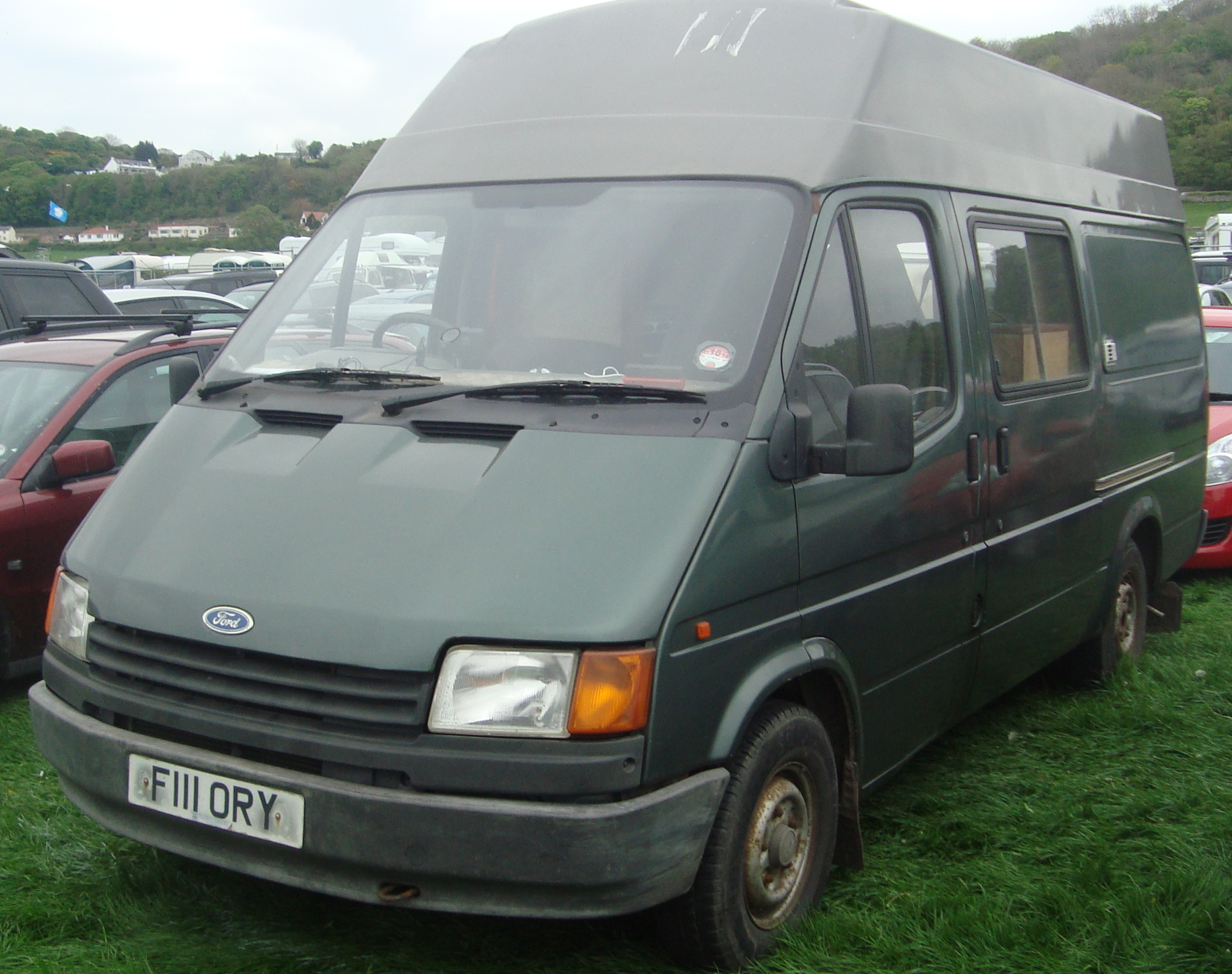
- Pre-facelift Ford Transit

Overview
- Also called: Ford Tourneo
- Production: 1986–2000; 1997–2017 (China); 1998–2003 (Vietnam)
- Assembly: Belgium: Genk (Genk Body & Assembly); United Kingdom: Southampton (Ford Southampton plant: 1986–2000); Turkey: Acıbadem, Üsküdar, Istanbul (Ford Otosan: 1994–2001); Belarus: Apchak (Ford Union: 1997–2000); Vietnam: Hai Duong (Ford Vietnam: 1998–2003); China: Nanchang (Jiangling Motors: 1997–2017)
- Designer: Uwe Bahnsen

Body and chassis
- Body style: 3/4-door van 2-door pickup 4-door minibus 4-door crew cab 2-door chassis cab 2-door Luton/box van
- Layout: FR layout
- Related: JMC Teshun

Powertrain
- Engine: 1.6 L Pinto I4; 2.0 L Pinto I4; 2.0 L.DOHC I4; 2.9 L Cologne V6; 3.0 L Essex V6; 2.5 L DI I4; 2.5 L Turbodiesel I4

Chronology
- Predecessor: Ford A series (for LWB variants)

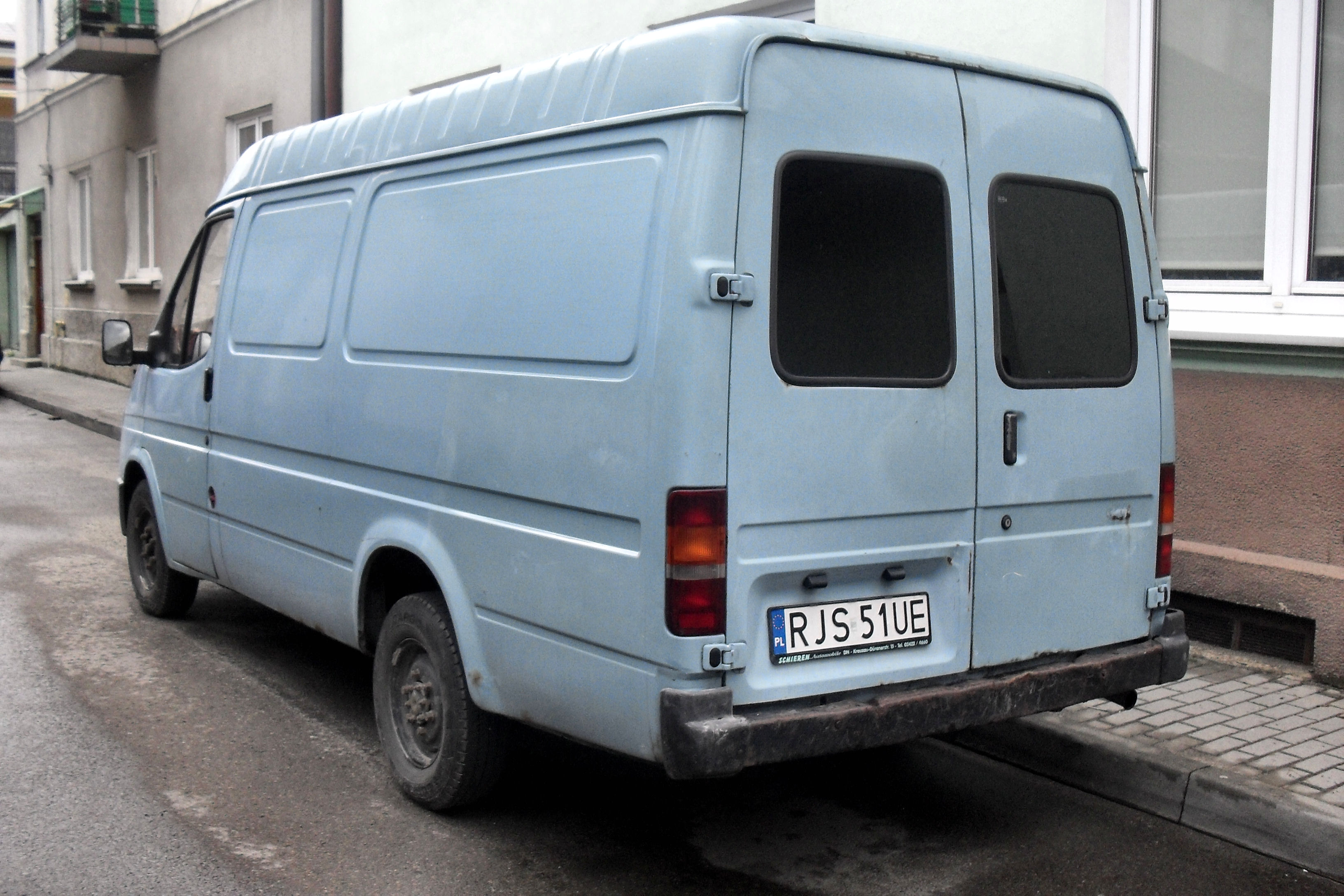
Pre facelift Ford Transit rear

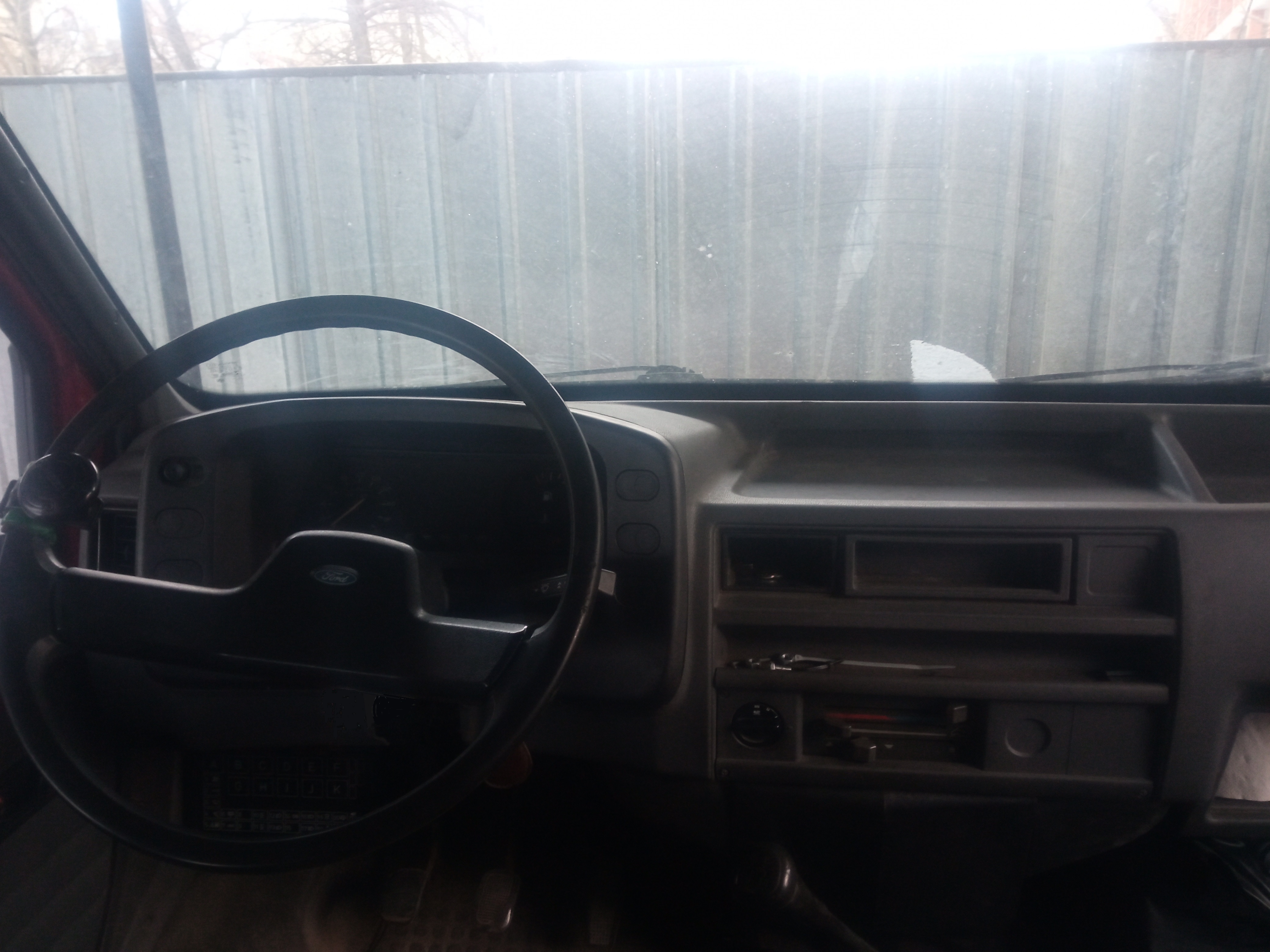
Pre facelift Ford Transit

Codenamed VE6, the second generation Transit platform appeared in January 1986 and was notable for its all-new bodyshell which was of "one-box" design (i.e. the windscreen and bonnet are at close to the same angle), and the front suspension was changed to a fully independent configuration on SWB versions. Initially fitted with Chubb AVA locks, Tibbe barrels were fitted soon after. The engine range was carried over largely unchanged from the last of the 1978–1985 Mk.1 facelift model, although in 1989 the high-performance 3.0 Essex V6 petrol was replaced by the Cologne 2.9 EFI V6, mainly because of emissions regulations as the Essex V6 design was nearly 25 years old by then and still used a carburettor. The third generation Transit was developed under the "Triton" code name.

=== Facelift (1992) ===
A subtle facelift in 1992 saw the fully independent front suspension adopted across the range, whilst a redesigned floor plan allowed the use of single, rather than paired, rear wheels on the LWB derivative, further increasing payload—these models are identifiable by the slightly more rounded front headlamps. In Australia, the third generation Transit did not go on sale until March 1994, after a 13-year absence from that market.

=== Facelift (1994) ===
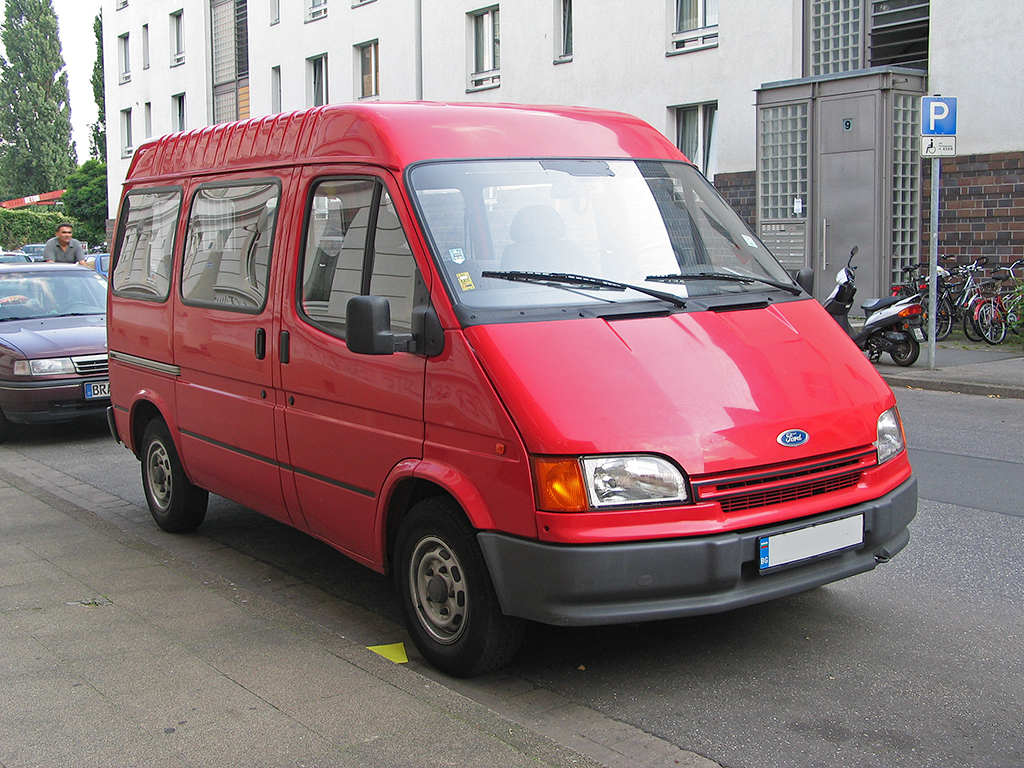
1991–1994 Ford Transit (first facelift)

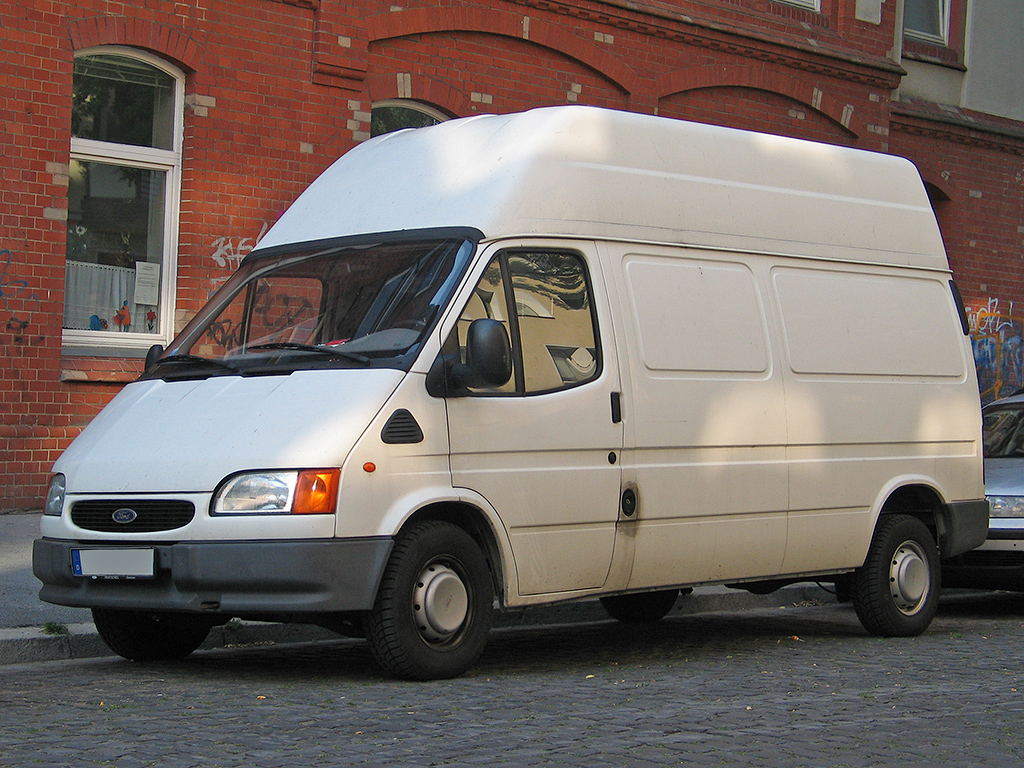
1994–2000 (in Europe) Ford Transit (second facelift)

A major facelift to the Transit in 1994 gave the Transit a new nose and dashboard, along with the 2.0 L DOHC 8-valve engine as found in the 1994 to 1998 Ford Scorpio. It is similar to the earlier Sierra DOHC unit but without the distributor and uses the updated OBD II-compliant EEC-V level engine control unit. At the same time air conditioning, electric windows, central locking, electric mirrors and airbags were all made available as optional extras.

In 1994, a campervan conversion produced by Auto-Sleepers converted in Willersey, Gloucestershire, known as the Auto-Sleepers Duetto was available. It was available with the high-top roof.

The naturally aspirated diesel engines came in 70 PS (51 kW) and 76 PS (56 kW) variants.The turbo diesel version came in 85 PS (63 kW) or 100 PS (74 kW) variants, and in 1998 a 115 PS (85 kW) intercooled version became available; all turbodiesels had an electronic fuel injection pump made by Lucas.

For the 30th anniversary of the Transit in 1995, Ford released a limited-edition model called the Transit Hallmark. Six hundred were made and were available in three colours, with 200 being made in each.

In Europe the VE83 Transit was available up to 2000, but in Vietnam it was built up to 2003 when it was exchanged in June for the new generation.

== Third generation (2000) ==
Third generation MK6 & MK7
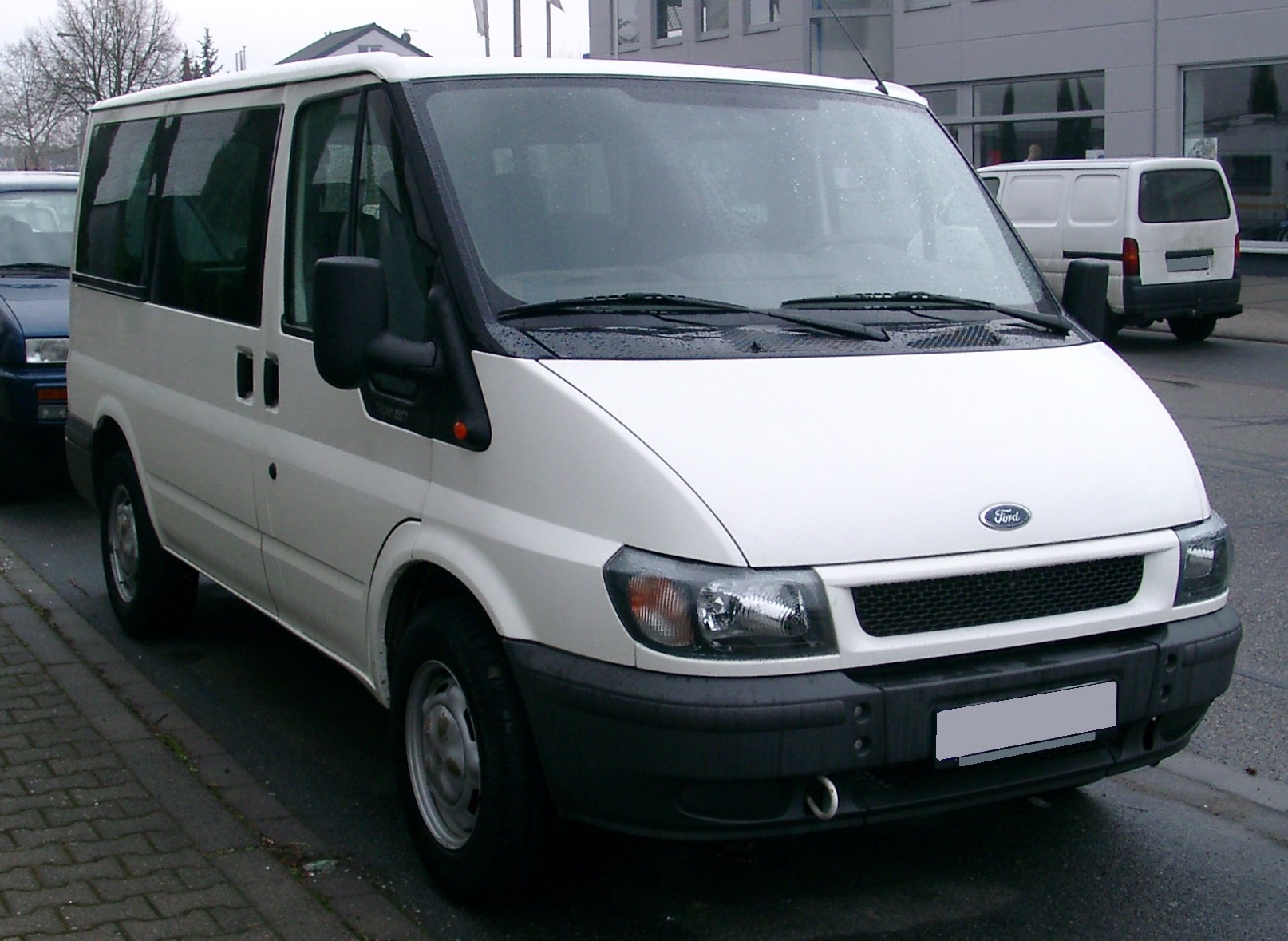

Overview
- Also called: Ford Tourneo; Ford Transit Pro (China, 2021–2024); JMC Fushun (China, 2022–present)
- Production: 2000–2014; 2008–present (China); 2014–2016 (Malaysia)
- Model years: 2009–present (China)
- Assembly: United Kingdom: Southampton (Ford Southampton plant: 2000–2013); Turkey: Gölcük, Kocaeli (Ford Otosan); Belarus: Apchak (Ford Union: 2000); Malaysia: Kulim, Kedah (Inokom: 2014–2016); Vietnam: Hai Duong (Ford Vietnam); Russia: Tatarstan (Ford Sollers); China: Nanchang (Jiangling: 2008–present)

Body and chassis
- Body style: 3/4-door van 2-door pickup 4-door minibus 4-door crew cab 2-door chassis cab
- Layout: Front-engine, front-wheel drive / rear-wheel drive or four-wheel drive

Powertrain
- Engine: 2.3 L I4; 2.0 L I4; 2.2 L Duratorq TDCi I4; 2.4 L Duratorq TDCi I4; 3.2 L Duratorq TDCi I5; 2.3 L Duratec I4
- Transmission: 5-speed Ford MT75 manual; 6-speed manual (from 2004); 5-speed Durashift-EST automated manual

=== Pre-facelift (2000) ===
The Transit, introduced in July 2000, was the third all-new design, and borrowed styling cues from Ford's "New Edge" designs, like the Focus and Ka. Developed by Ford in the United States, the main innovation is that it is available in either front- or rear-wheel drive. Ford nomenclature makes this the V184 (rear-wheel-drive) or V185 (front-wheel-drive) model. This model features the "Puma"-type Duratorq turbo diesel engine also used in the 2000 Mondeo and Jaguar X-Type, with the petrol versions moving up to the 2.3 L 16-valve edition of the straight-4 engine.

A demonstration of this model's speed with the smallest panel van body, rear-wheel-drive, highest output 136 PS 2.4 Duratorq turbo-diesel engine and optional 6-speed manual gearbox was shown in series 6 of Top Gear in 2005, where German race driver Sabine Schmitz attempted to drive it around the Nürburgring in under ten minutes, matching Jeremy Clarkson's time in a turbodiesel Jaguar S-Type; after weight reduction and aerodynamic modifications, she was only just unsuccessful, marking her fastest lap at 10m 8s.

This version won the International Van of the Year 2001.

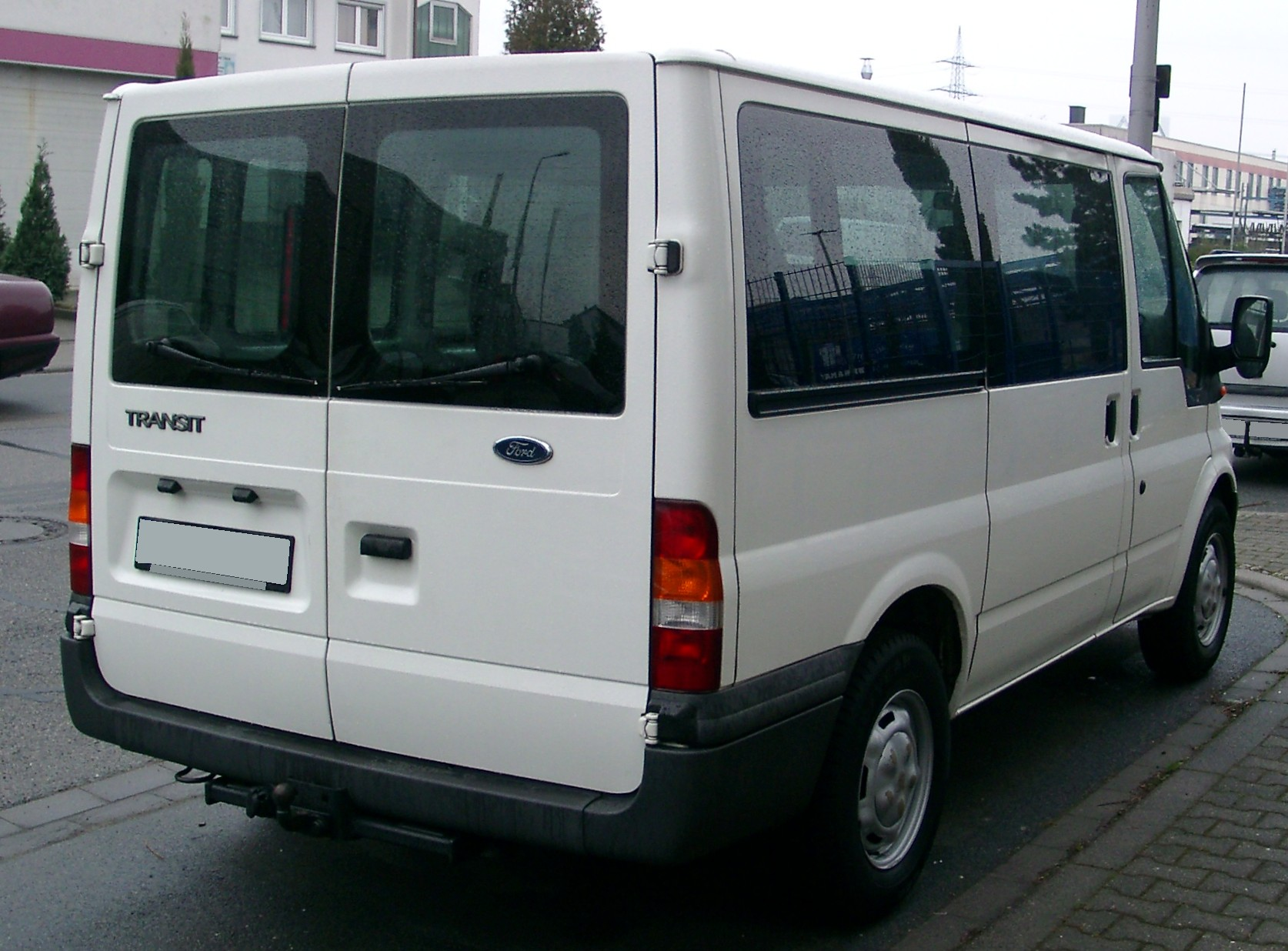
Ford Transit pre-facelift

The Durashift EST automatic transmission (optional on all rear-wheel-drive models) features controls mounted on the dashboard, a specially adapted manual mode, tow-haul mode, economy mode and winter mode. This is known as the ASM (automatically shifting manual) system in the Australian market.

2002 saw the introduction of the first High Pressure Common Rail diesel engine in the Transit, with the launch of the 125 PS (92 kW) HPCR 2.0-litre in the FWD. Production of the van started at the new Ford-Otosan plant in Kocaeli, Turkey which saw the end of all production at the Genk, Belgium plant which had been producing Transits since 1965. This coincided with the introduction of the Transit Connect (also produced in Kocaeli), a smaller panel van based on the C170 (Focus) platform and aimed at replacing the older Escort and Fiesta based models. Despite the name, the Connect has no engineering commonality with the full-size Transit.

2003 saw a new instrument cluster with a digital odometer.

2004 saw the launch of the first RWD HPCR, the 135 PS (99 kW) 2.4-litre variant that also introduced the 6-speed MT-82 RWD manual gearbox.

The five millionth Transit rolled off the Southampton line on Monday, July 18, 2005, and was donated to an English charity.

=== Facelift (2006) ===
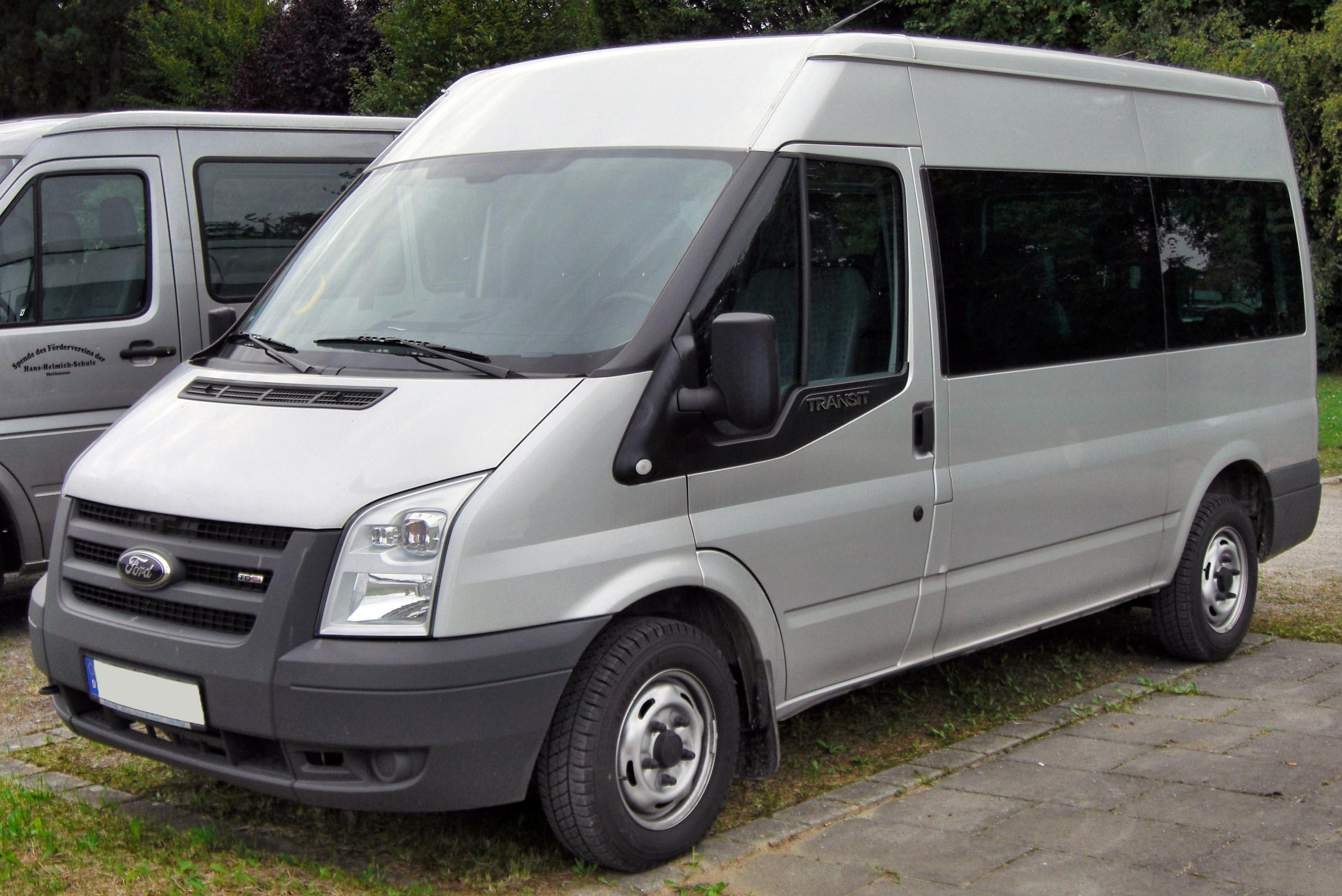
Ford Transit (facelift)

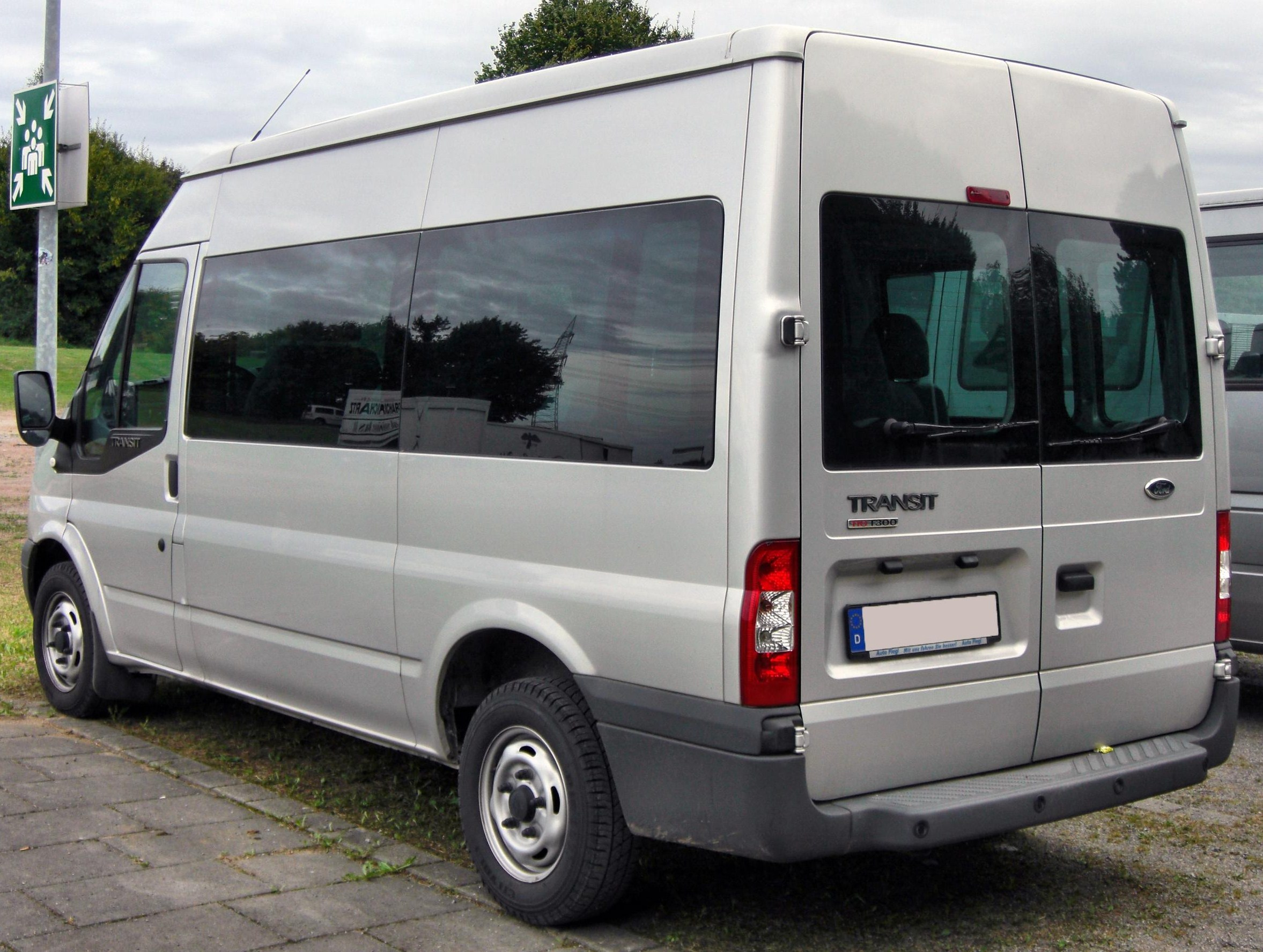
Ford Transit (facelift)

The third-generation Transit received a facelift to the body, introduced in July 2006, including new front and rear lights, a new front end and a new interior featuring the gearstick on the dashboard and Ford's new corporate radio design. Besides the styling changes, the powertrains were revised. The old petrol engine was replaced with one from the Ford Ranger, the front-wheel-drive diesel went from 2.0 to 2.2 litres capacity, and all diesel engines gained high-pressure common rail (TDCi) systems. The powertrains were changed to meet new emissions legislation. Additionally, the facelift introduced CAN bus electronics to the Transit for the first time. The new version (Ford nomenclature V347 for front-wheel drive and V348 for rear-wheel drive) won International Van of the Year for 2007 despite tough competition from several all-new rivals. This Transit arrived in Mexico to replace the Freestar after the 2007 model year. This was the first Transit with a five-cylinder engine available (in the 3.2L 200PS version).

Mid-2006 saw the launch of the "Sport Van", a production van featuring the 130 PS (96 kW) engine with additional styling parts, "Le Mans" stripes and 18-inch alloy wheels.

Late-2007 saw the launch of the 140 PS (103 kW) engine for front-wheel-drives (replacing the 130 PS) complete with the VMT6 6-speed manual transaxle to cope with the extra power.

The 6-speed transaxle was introduced on the mid-power FWD in late 2008 when the 110 PS (81 kW) engine was upped to 115 PS (85 kW).

In late 2008, the "coated Diesel Particulate Filter" (cDPF)—designed to meet higher emission standards than the current Euro IV requirement—was introduced as an option on all diesel engines. Production ended in 2013, with the Southampton plant closing down making this generation the last of the British built Transits, but returned in China in two modified forms.

Engines

- 2.2 L Diesel, 63 kW (86 PS); 2006–2014
- 2.2 L Diesel, 81 kW (110 PS); 2006–2008
- 2.2 L Diesel, 85 kW (116 PS); 2008–2014
- 2.2 L Diesel, 96 kW (131 PS); 2006–2007
- 2.2 L Diesel, 103 kW (140 PS); 2007–2014
- 2.4 L Diesel, 74 kW (101 PS); 2006–2014
- 2.4 L Diesel, 85 kW (116 PS); 2006–2014
- 2.4 L Diesel, 103 kW (140 PS); 2006–2014
- 3.2 L Diesel, 147 kW (200 PS); 2007–2014
- 2.3 L Petrol, 107 kW (145 PS); 2006–2014

=== Safety ===
ANCAP test results* Ford Transit short wheelbase, low roof, front-wheel-drive variants (2008)
Test	Score
Overall	3 /5 stars
Frontal offset	6.53/16
Side impact	16/16
Pole	Not Assessed
Seat belt reminders	0/3
Whiplash protection	Not Assessed
Pedestrian protection	Poor
Electronic stability control	Optional

== Fourth generation (2014) ==
Fourth generation
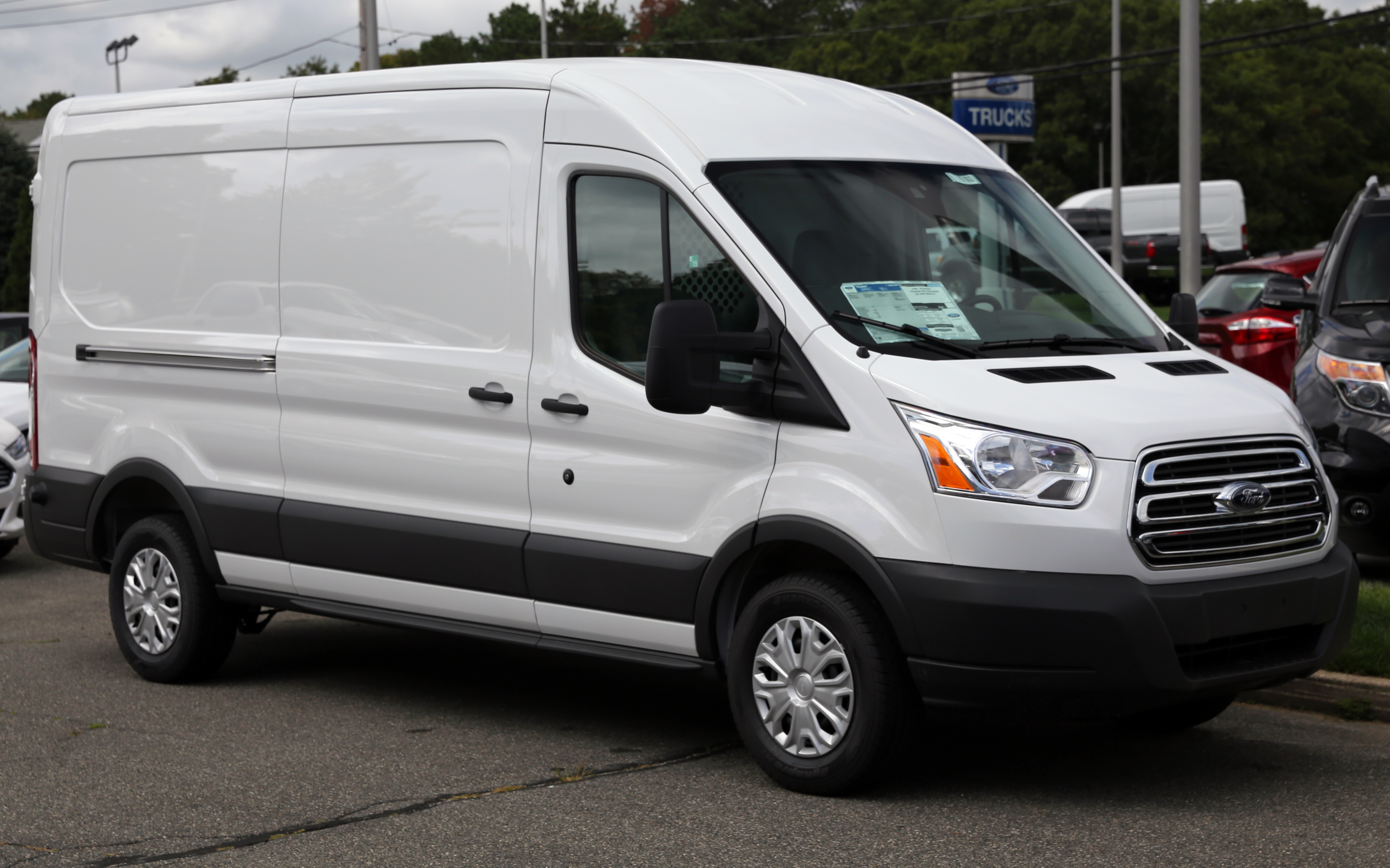

Overview
- Also called: Ford Tourneo (passenger van, outside North America); Ford T-Series; StreetScooter Work XL (Electric van, Germany); Ford Transit T8 (China)
- Production: 2014–present
- Model years: 2015–present
- Assembly: Turkey: Gölcük, Kocaeli (Ford Otosan); United States: Claycomo, Missouri (Kansas City Assembly); Russia: Yelabuga (Ford Sollers: 2014–2022); Uruguay: Montevideo (Nordex S.A.); China: Nanchang (Jiangling: 2023–present)
- Designer: Paul Campbell

Body and chassis
- Class: Full-size van
- Body style: Cargo van Passenger van Chassis cab Cutaway van
- Layout: Front engine, rear wheel drive Front engine, all wheel drive (Europe and North America only); Front engine, front wheel drive (Excludes North America); Rear motor, rear wheel drive (E-TRANSIT)

Powertrain
- Engine: Diesel engines 2.0 L EcoBlue TDCi I4; 2.0 L Duratorq TDCi I4 (China only); 2.2 L Duratorq TDCi I4 (Europe and Australia only); 2.4 L Duratorq TDCi I4 (Europe only); 3.2 L Duratorq TDCi/Power Stroke I5 (All markets except for South America); Diesel Mild Hybrid engines 2.0 L EcoBlue Hybrid mHEV TDCi I4; Petrol engines 2.0 L EcoBoost I4 (China only); 2.3 L Duratec I4 (Europe only); 3.5 L Ti-VCT V6 (North America only); 3.7 L Ti-VCT V6 (North America only); 3.5 L EcoBoost V6 (North America and South America only include Transit Prisoner Transport Vehicle)
- Electric motor: 11.5 kW (15.4 hp) belt-driven integrated starter/generator (BISG) (Transit EcoBlue Hybrid); 198 kW (266 hp) DC permanent-magnet electric motor (E-TRANSIT)
- Transmission: 6-speed 6R80 automatic 6-speed Getrag MT82-D4 manual (Outside North America); 5-speed manual (China only) single-speed automatic (Electric); 10-speed 10R80 automatic (2020–present); 8 speed automatic (China; 2023–present)
- Hybrid drivetrain: EcoBlue Mild Hybrid mHEV (Transit EcoBlue Hybrid)
- Battery: 48-volt battery pack (MHEV); 68kWh Li-ion High-Voltage Battery (EV)
- Plug-in charging: V2L: 2.4 kW (EV)

Dimensions
- Wheelbase: Cargo & passenger van 129.9 in (3,300 mm) (regular); 147.6 in (3,750 mm) (long); Cab chassis & cutaway 138.0 in (3,505 mm) (short); 155.7 in (3,955 mm) (regular); 178.0 in (4,520 mm) (long)
- Length: 217.8–266.1 in (5,532.1–6,758.9 mm)
- Width: 80.8–83.7 in (2,052.3–2,126.0 mm)
- Height: 82.2–120.1 in (2,087.9–3,050.5 mm)

Chronology
- Predecessor: Ford E-Series (North America)

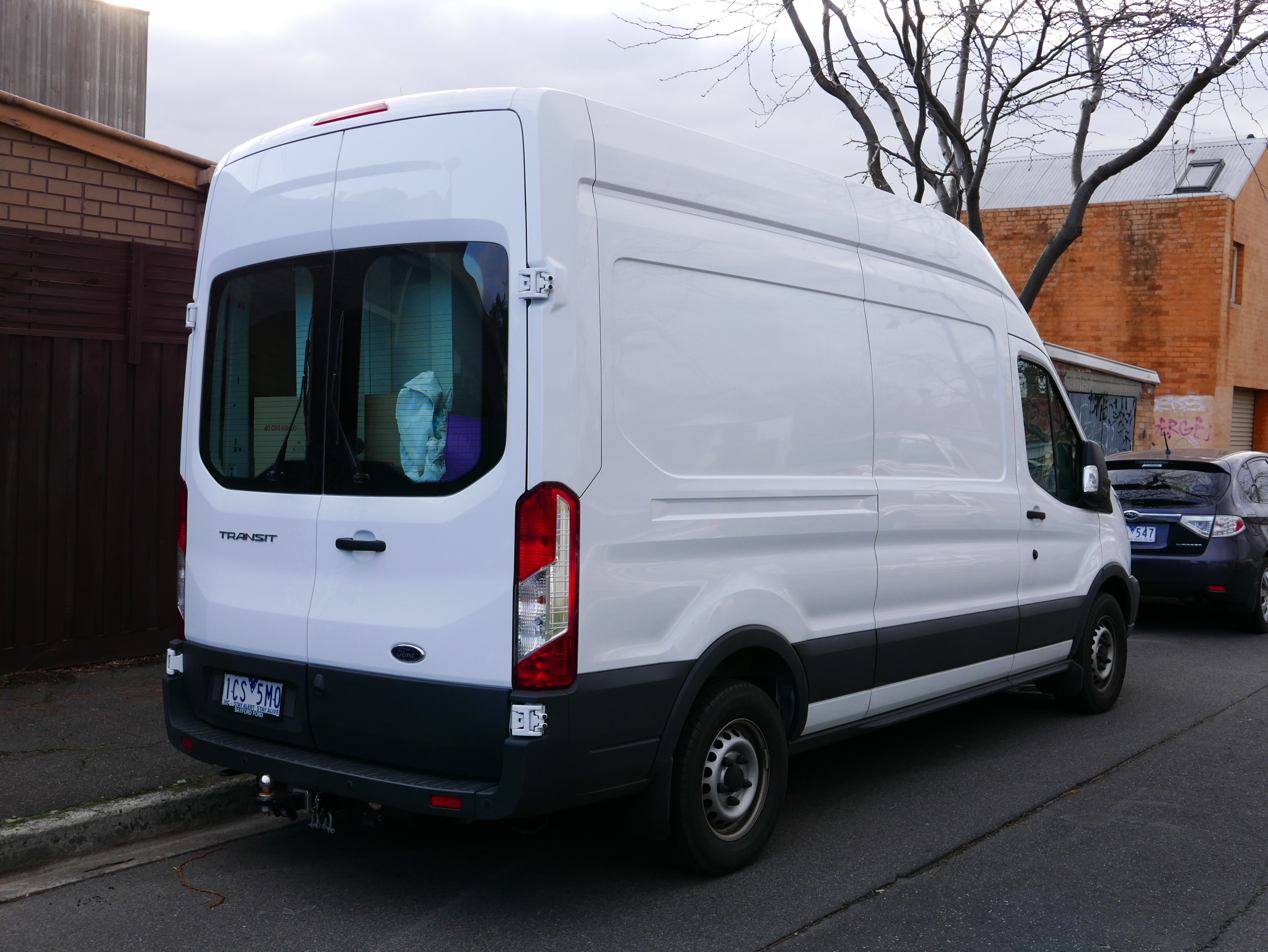
2014 Ford Transit 350E cargo van (Australia), rear view

The fourth-generation Transit was launched in January 2013 at the 2013 North American (Detroit) International Auto Show. In contrast to the previous generation developed in the United States (but never sold there), the fourth-generation Transit was co-designed by Ford of Europe and Ford in North America. After entering production for worldwide sale in 2013, Ford began production of the Transit in Kansas City Assembly in April 2014 for the 2015 model year. Sold worldwide by Ford for the first time, the fourth-generation Transit competes against the Chevrolet Express/GMC Savana, Mercedes-Benz Sprinter, Fiat Ducato (and its variants), and the Volkswagen Crafter.

The first generation sold in the United States and Canada, the fourth-generation Transit directly replaced the 1992-2014 E-Series Van and Wagon (with the preceding model line remaining in production, solely as a cutaway/chassis cab). While the Transit is also sold as a cutaway/chassis cab, Ford does not sell the single/double-cab pickup truck variants of the Transit in North America, where it sells the full F-Series line.

The debut of the fourth generation saw Ford transition the Transit from a single model line into a commercially-oriented Ford sub-brand. Alongside the namesake full-size vehicle and the MPV-sized Transit Connect, the Transit Custom was introduced as a mid-size van (sized between the Transit and Transit Connect), replacing the previous front-wheel drive Transit with a distinct model line. In 2014, the Fiesta-based Transit Courier debuted as the smallest model of the product range.

=== Chassis ===
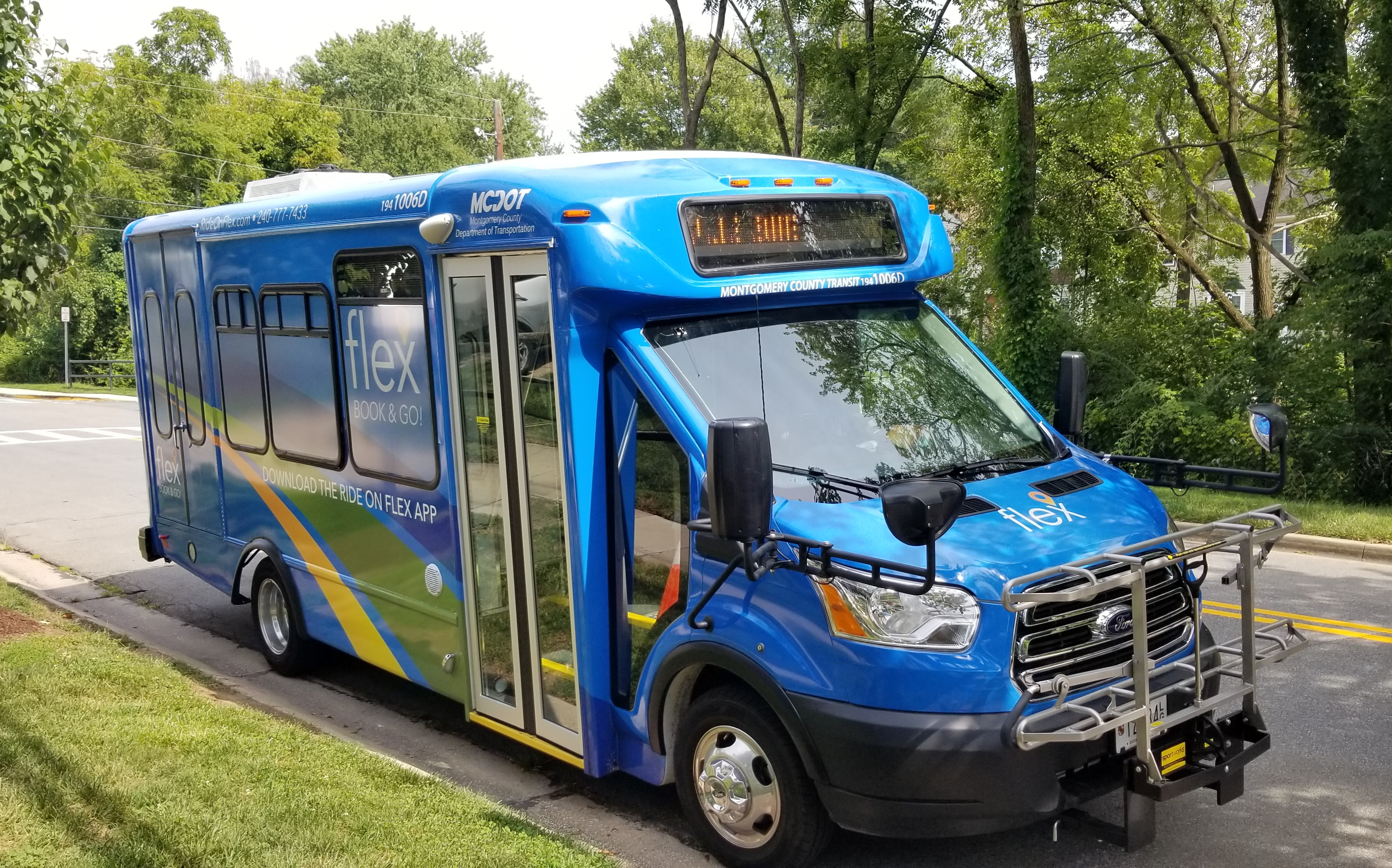
Public transit minibus (based on 350 HD cutaway with factory Shuttle Bus Prep Package, without a passenger door)

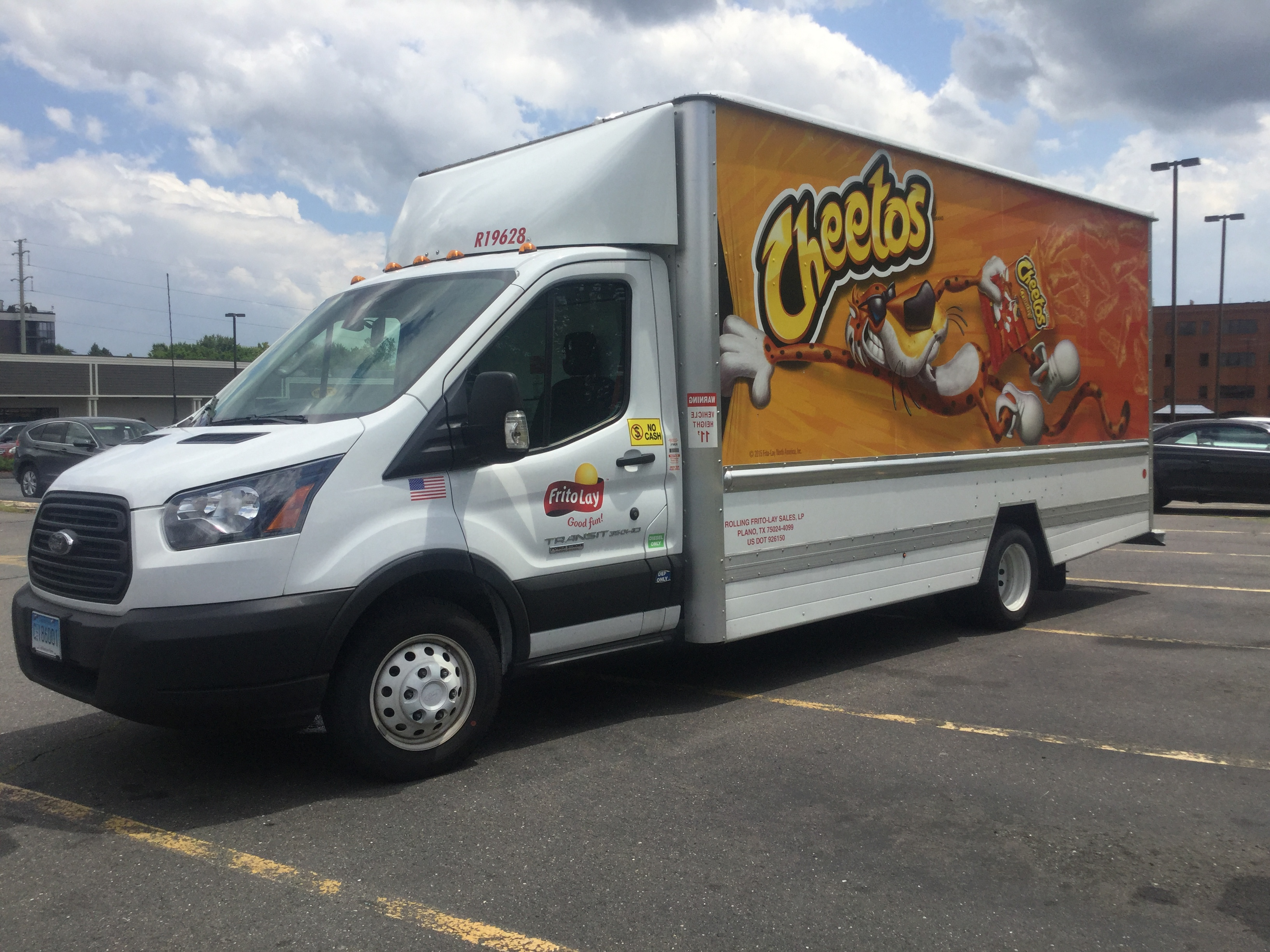
Ford Transit 350HD 3.2L chassis cab

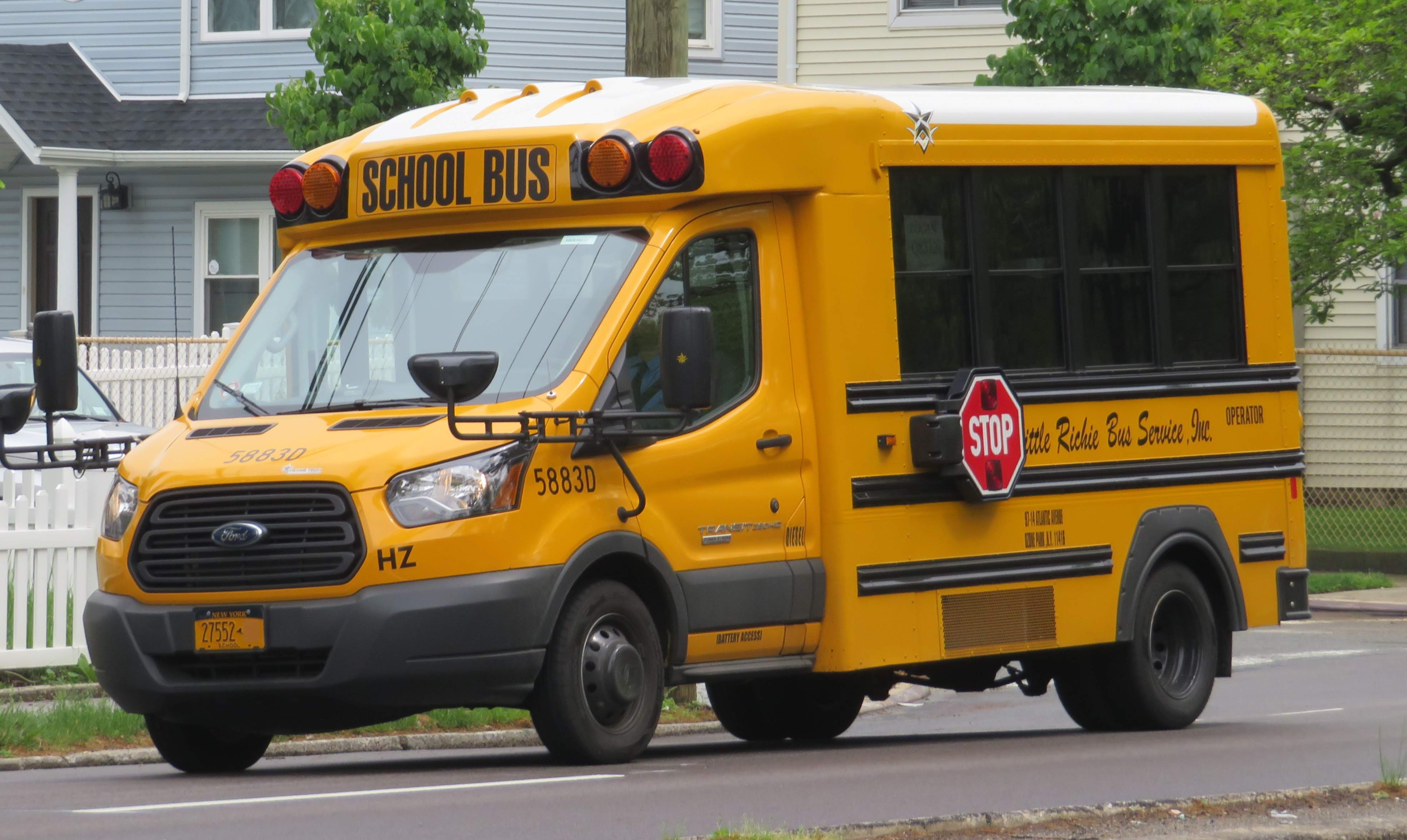
Ford Transit 350HD with type-A school bus body

The fourth-generation Transit is offered in a rear-wheel drive powertrain layout; the front-wheel drive version of the previous generation has been replaced by the Transit Custom. The Transit van is offered in two wheelbases (129.9 inches and 147.6 inches) while the chassis cab/cutaway van is offered in three wheelbases (138 inches, 155.7, and 178 inches). As with previous-generation vans, extended-wheelbase vans were produced with either single or dual rear-wheel axles.

In a major change from the E-Series, the Transit uses a unibody chassis design instead of a separate frame; while no longer using a separate chassis, the high use of boron steel allowed for increase in payload capacity of up to 600 pounds (over a similar-configuration E-Series). The long-running Twin I-Beams of the E-Series were retired, as the fourth-generation Transit uses MacPherson struts for the front suspension; the live rear axle is leaf-sprung. The model line is fitted with four-wheel disc brakes.

==== Powertrain ====
For its worldwide introduction in 2013, the fourth-generation Transit inherited the Duratorq diesel engines from the previous generation, shared with the Ranger and Mondeo. A 2.0L inline-four was introduced (for China), shared with the 2.2 and 2.4-litre inline-fours (the former, for Europe and Australia; the latter, Europe); the largest engine was a 3.2-liter inline-five (for markets outside South America). Gasoline engines were also offered, including a 2.0-liter EcoBoost inline-four (for China) and a 2.3-liter Duratec inline-four.

For production in the Americas, the Transit was offered with higher-displacement gasoline engines (shared with the F-Series). A 275 hp 3.7L V6 was the standard engine in North America, with a 310 hp 3.5L twin-turbo EcoBoost V6 offered in both North and South America; the 185 hp 3.2L inline-5 was offered beginning in 2015 (renamed as a Power Stroke diesel). From 2015 to 2019, all engines were paired to a 6-speed automatic transmission, replaced by a 10-speed automatic for 2020.

As an option through Ford, the 3.7L engine can be converted to run on compressed natural gas (CNG) or liquefied petroleum gas (propane).

=== Body configuration ===
In a design shift, the Transit (and Transit Custom) moved from the New Edge styling of the previous generation to the Kinetic design language; the interior was influenced by the third-generation Ford Focus. The fourth-generation Transit as both a van and as a chassis cab/cutaway cab; the pickup truck of the previous generation has been discontinued. The van is offered in three different roof lengths and three different roof heights.

Available Transit (4th gen) cargo van configurations & interior dimensions
Body length Body height			Regular		Long	Extended
Body length Body height			217.8–219.9 in (5,530–5,590 mm)		235.5–237.6 in (5,980–6,040 mm)	263.9 in (6,700 mm)
Body length Body height			WB	130 in (3,300 mm)	148 in (3,800 mm)	
Low	83.6 in (2,120 mm)	Volume	280.9 ft^{3} (7.95 m^{3})		311.9 ft^{3} (8.83 m^{3})	No
Low	83.6 in (2,120 mm)	Interior (L×W×H)	126.0 in × 54.8 in × 56.9 in (3,200 mm × 1,390 mm × 1,450 mm)		143.7 in × 54.8 in × 56.9 in (3,650 mm × 1,390 mm × 1,450 mm)	No
Low	83.6 in (2,120 mm)	GVWR	8,670 lb (3,930 kg) T-150; 9,070 lb (4,110 kg) T-250; 9,500 lb (4,300 kg) T-350		8,670 lb (3,930 kg) T-150; 9,070 lb (4,110 kg) T-250; 9,500 lb (4,300 kg) T-350; 9,950 lb (4,510 kg) T-350HD SRW	No
Medium	100.8 in (2,560 mm)	Volume	358.7 ft^{3} (10.16 m^{3})		400.5 ft^{3} (11.34 m^{3})	No
Medium	100.8 in (2,560 mm)	Interior (L×W×H)	126.0 in × 54.8 in × 72.0 in (3,200 mm × 1,390 mm × 1,830 mm)		143.7 in × 54.8 in × 72.0 in (3,650 mm × 1,390 mm × 1,830 mm)	No
Medium	100.8 in (2,560 mm)	GVWR	8,670 lb (3,930 kg) T-150; 9,070 lb (4,110 kg) T-250; 9,500 lb (4,300 kg) T-350		8,670 lb (3,930 kg) T-150; 9,070 lb (4,110 kg) T-250; 9,500 lb (4,300 kg) T-350; 9,950 lb (4,510 kg) T-350HD SRW	No
High	110.1 in (2,800 mm)	Volume	No		453.4 ft^{3} (12.84 m^{3})	536.4 ft^{3} (15.19 m^{3})
High	110.1 in (2,800 mm)	Interior (L×W×H)	No		143.7 in × 54.8 in × 81.5 in (3,650 mm × 1,390 mm × 2,070 mm)	172.2 in × 54.8 in × 81.5 in (4,370 mm × 1,390 mm × 2,070 mm); Width 45.4 in (1,150 mm) for dual rear wheels
High	110.1 in (2,800 mm)	GVWR	No		9,070 lb (4,110 kg) T-250; 9,500 lb (4,300 kg) T-350; 9,950 lb (4,510 kg) T-350HD SRW	9,070 lb (4,110 kg) T-250; 9,500 lb (4,300 kg) T-350; 9,950 lb (4,510 kg) T-350HD SRW; 9,950–11,000 lb (4,510–4,990 kg) T-350HD DRW

In most worldwide markets, the Transit passenger van is primarily marketed under the Ford Tourneo name, with Ford using the Transit name for both cargo and passenger vans in the United States and Canada. In line with other Ford trucks in North America, the Transit is marketed in XL and XLT trims. In line with the F-Series trucks (and its E-Series predecessor), in North America, the Transit is marketed in 150/250/350 (and 350HD) payload series, determined by wheelbase, body length, and roof height.

As with the E-Series and the previous-generation Transit, the model line serves as the basis for multiple commercial vehicles, including ambulances, buses, and recreational vehicles.

=== 2020 update ===
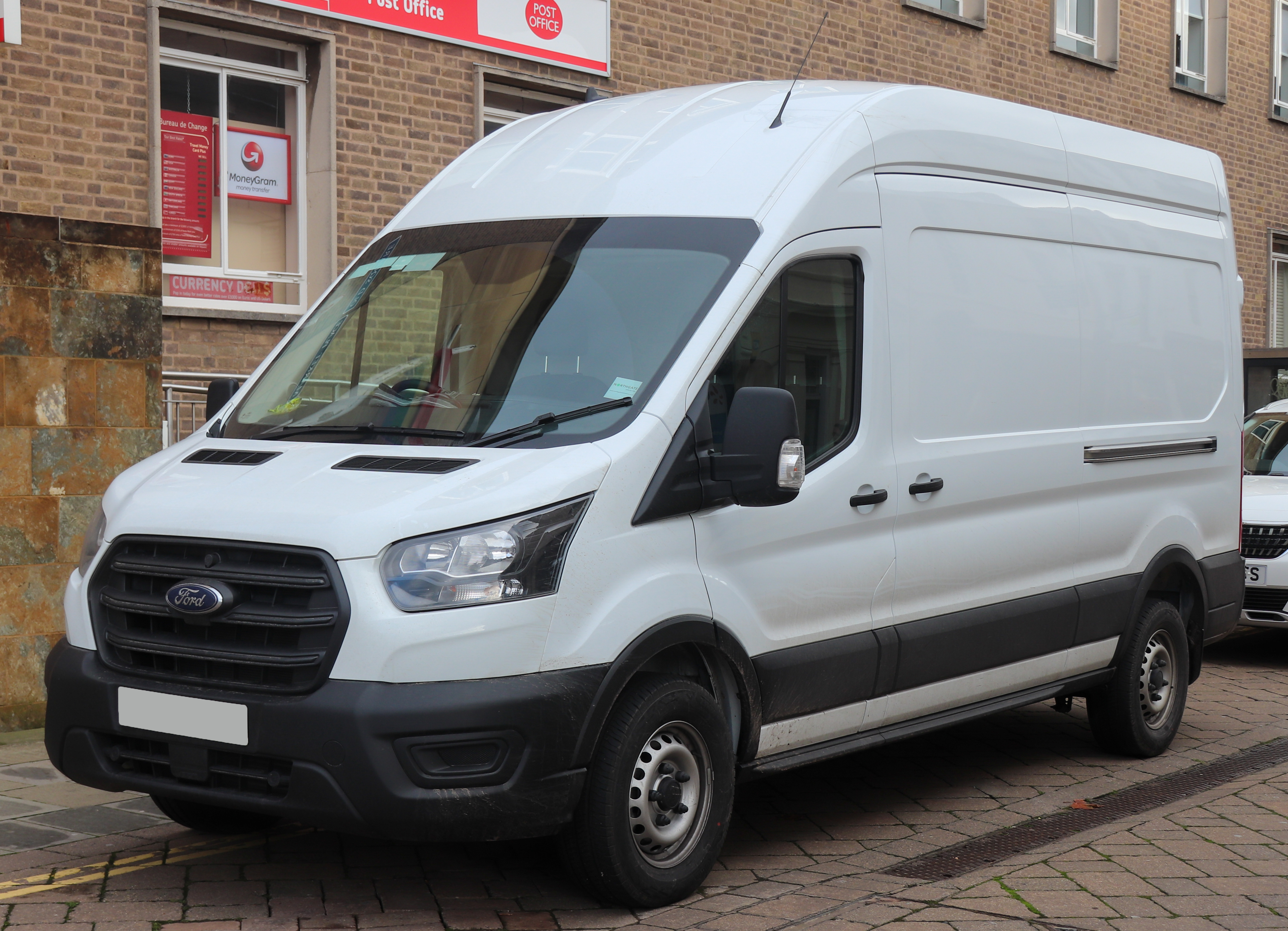

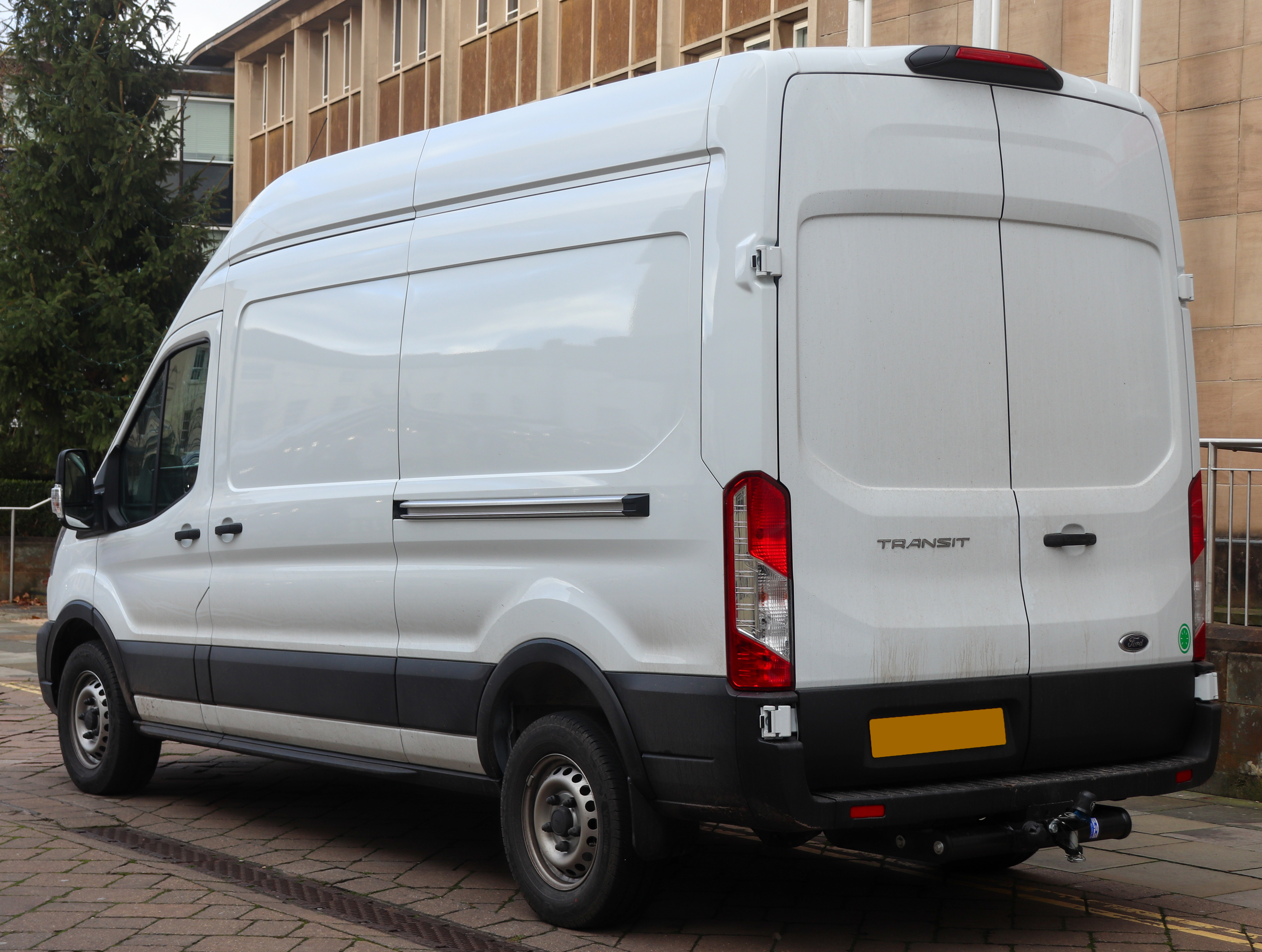
2020 facelift

For 2020 production, the Ford Transit underwent a mid-cycle model revision, distinguished by an update of the front fascia and dashboard. In both Otosan and Claycomo-produced examples, the powertrain saw several updates. For North America, a naturally-aspirated 275 hp 3.5L V6 with port and direct injection replaced the 3.7L V6; the 3.5L twin-turbo V6 remained an option. For markets outside the Americas, the four Duratorq diesel engines were replaced by a single 2.0L EcoBlue inline-4 turbodiesel (shared with the Ranger outside of North America). Offered in multiple power outputs (105, 130, 170, 185 PS), the EcoBlue engine is also offered with a mild-hybrid option (with the 130 PS engine). Initially intended for North American sale (alongside the Transit Connect), the EcoBlue option was dropped shortly before its introduction.

All-wheel drive is again an option for the model line. A new trim level marketed as Transit Trail was also made available for the Transit and Transit Custom. It features a Quaife locking differential and design elements of the North-American market Ford F-150 Raptor. A crew van body style was introduced as a new option; known as a double cab in Europe, the design combines the design of a passenger and cargo van, offering 5-passenger seating and a large rear cargo space. The 2020 Transit also adopted power-sliding doors and dual sliding doors (for cargo vans) as options.

=== E-Transit ===
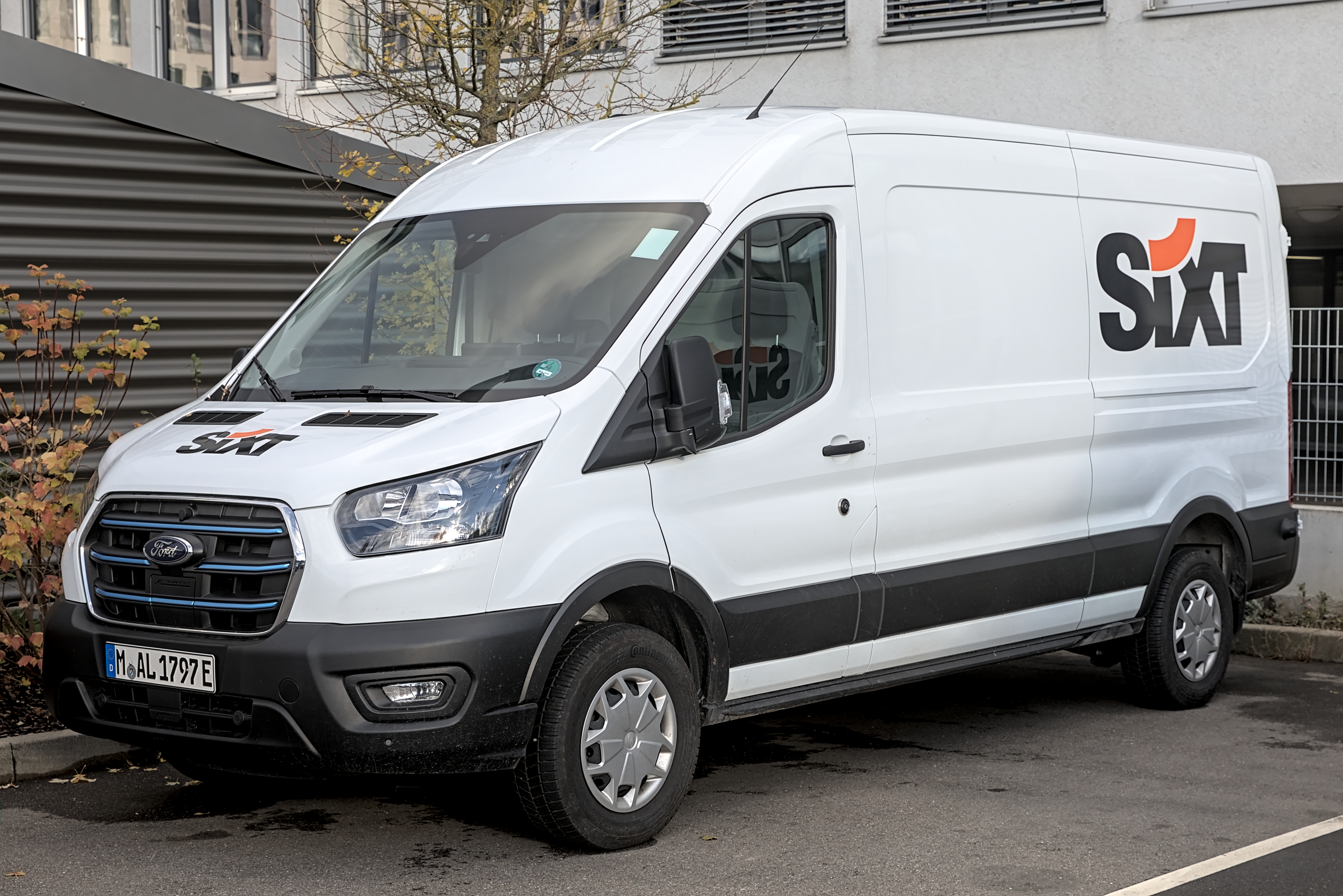
E-Transit

In November 2020, Ford announced the 2022 E-Transit battery electric cargo van; key specifications include a 3,880 lb (1,760 kg) / 487.3 ft^{3} (13.80 m^{3}) maximum cargo capacity, 68 kWh (usable capacity) battery and up to 126 mi (203 km) range, based on the U.S. EPA Multi-Cycle Test (MCT) procedure. The E-Transit began production at Ford's Kansas City Assembly Plant in November 2021. The first E-Transits were delivered to American customers in February 2022; according to Ford, they had received more than 10,000 orders for the E-Transit from 300 commercial fleets. E-Transit production for the European market began at Otosan in April 2022 to fill orders totaling more than 5,000 vehicles.

The E-Transit has a unique chassis to accommodate the traction battery between the frame rails, but is fitted with the same bodies as the conventional Transit. Under the bonnet, Ford have fitted cooling pumps for the high-voltage traction battery and motor, along with cabin climate control equipment and other electrical gear, including the DC-DC converter. Externally, the E-Transit can be distinguished by its rear axle, which carries the traction motor and has an independent suspension using semi-trailing arms and coil springs, rather than the live axle and leaf springs of the conventional Transit.

The liquid-cooled traction battery is sourced from the Mustang Mach-E; usable capacity is 68 kWh with a gross capacity of 77 kWh. Maximum charging speeds are 11.3 kW (AC) or 115 kW (DC). The Combined Charging System vehicle inlet is on the front of the car, below the manufacturer's emblem. The traction motor of the E-Transit is shared with the Ford F-150 Lightning, with a nominal output of 266 hp (198 kW) and 317 lb⋅ft (430 N⋅m); in the UK, it is offered with a choice of two traction motor outputs, 181 or 265 hp (135 or 198 kW); both produce the same torque as the US model. Operating in Eco mode, power is limited to 133 hp (99 kW). The advertised maximum range of 126 mi (203 km) (EPA) is accomplished with the low-roof model. Under the WLTP cycle, maximum range is 317 km (197 mi). When equipped with the Pro Power Onboard option, the E-Transit can supply up to 2.4 kW of electrical power for tools and accessories through conventional AC outlets.

In 2024, Ford introduced a larger battery, increasing the usable capacity from 68 kWh to 89 kWh.

There are 25 combinations of height (2 choices), wheelbase (3), and gross vehicle weight rating (3) in the UK. In the United States, purchasers are given a choice of three body lengths (Regular, Long, or Extended), two wheelbases (130.0 or 148.0 in (3,300 or 3,760 mm)), three roof heights (Low, Medium, or High), and three chassis preparations (cargo van, cutaway, or chassis cab; the latter two are offered with a 178.0 in (4,520 mm) wheelbase only); all US versions are sold as a single T-350 model with a GVWR of 9,500 lb (4,300 kg).

What Car? named the E-Transit its Van of the Year in 2022.

=== Safety ===
ANCAP test results Ford Transit diesel variants MY23 onwards (2020)
Overall
Grading:	63% (Gold)

ANCAP test results Fourth generation diesel van variants (2024)
Overall
Grading:	93% (Platinum)

Euro NCAP test results Ford Transit (2025)
Test	Score
Overall:	5 /5 stars
Safe driving	78%
Crash avoidance	93%
Post crash	80%

=== Assembly ===
Worldwide production of the fourth-generation Transit is sourced from two Ford facilities. All Transit production for Europe and Asia is sourced from Ford Otosan in Kocaeli Province, Turkey; this factory provides a percentage of global exports. North American and South American production is primarily sourced from Kansas City Assembly in Claycomo, Missouri; production at the Kansas City Assembly Plant began on April 30, 2014.

In North America, the model line was launched as a 2015 model, adopting the Transit name for both cargo and passenger vans (rather than using the Tourneo name used in other markets for passenger vans).

=== Sales ===
Calendar year	U.S. sales
2014	20,448
2015	117,577
2016	143,244
2017	127,360
2018	137,794
2019	153,868
2020	131,557
2021	99,745
2022	99,382 (inc. 6,500 E-Transit)
2023	129,009 (inc. 7,672 E-Transit)
2024	152,738 (inc. 12,610 E-Transit)
2025	161,797 (inc. 5,186 E-Transit)

== Chinese production ==
=== Second generation Transit (1997–2017) ===
Introduced in 1997, the Ford Transit VJX6541DK-M is a license-built version of the Transit assembled by Jiangling Motors (JMC) in Nanchang. Produced solely for the Chinese domestic market, it was derived from the second-generation VE6/VE83/VE94 platform. Over its Ford predecessor produced from 1986 to 2000, JMC made 70 major updates to the design. The exterior was distinguished by revision to the front fascia, including larger front headlamps and a redesigned grille and front bumper. The interior saw several ergonomic improvements, along with the standardization of power windows. ABS was offered as an option. The top speed is specified at 68.35 mph (110 km/h).

Sharing its underpinnings with the second-generation Transit, the JMC-built Transit differed substantially in its powertrain configuration. In place of Ford produced engines, the model line used a 92 kW Mitsubishi-produced 2.4 L inline-4. Two Isuzu-produced 2.8 L inline-4 diesels were offered; a naturally aspirated version offering 67.6 kW-68 kW and a turbocharged, intercooled version, offering 80–85 kW.

In 2008, Ford commenced sales of the V347/V348 Transit in China alongside its JMC-produced counterpart, branded the Ford-produced van as the New Transit and the JMC van as the Transit Classic. Between the two manufacturers, a combined 210,000 examples of both generations were sold in China; in 2012, Ford expanded operations, allowing production capacity to expand to 300,000 vehicles. In January 2010, the Toyota recalls affected the Transit Classic, as Ford/JMC utilized the same supplier of accelerator pedals (CTS Corporation), suspecting the units were defective and posed a risk of unintended acceleration. Approximately 1600 Ford Transit Classics in China were affected by the recall.

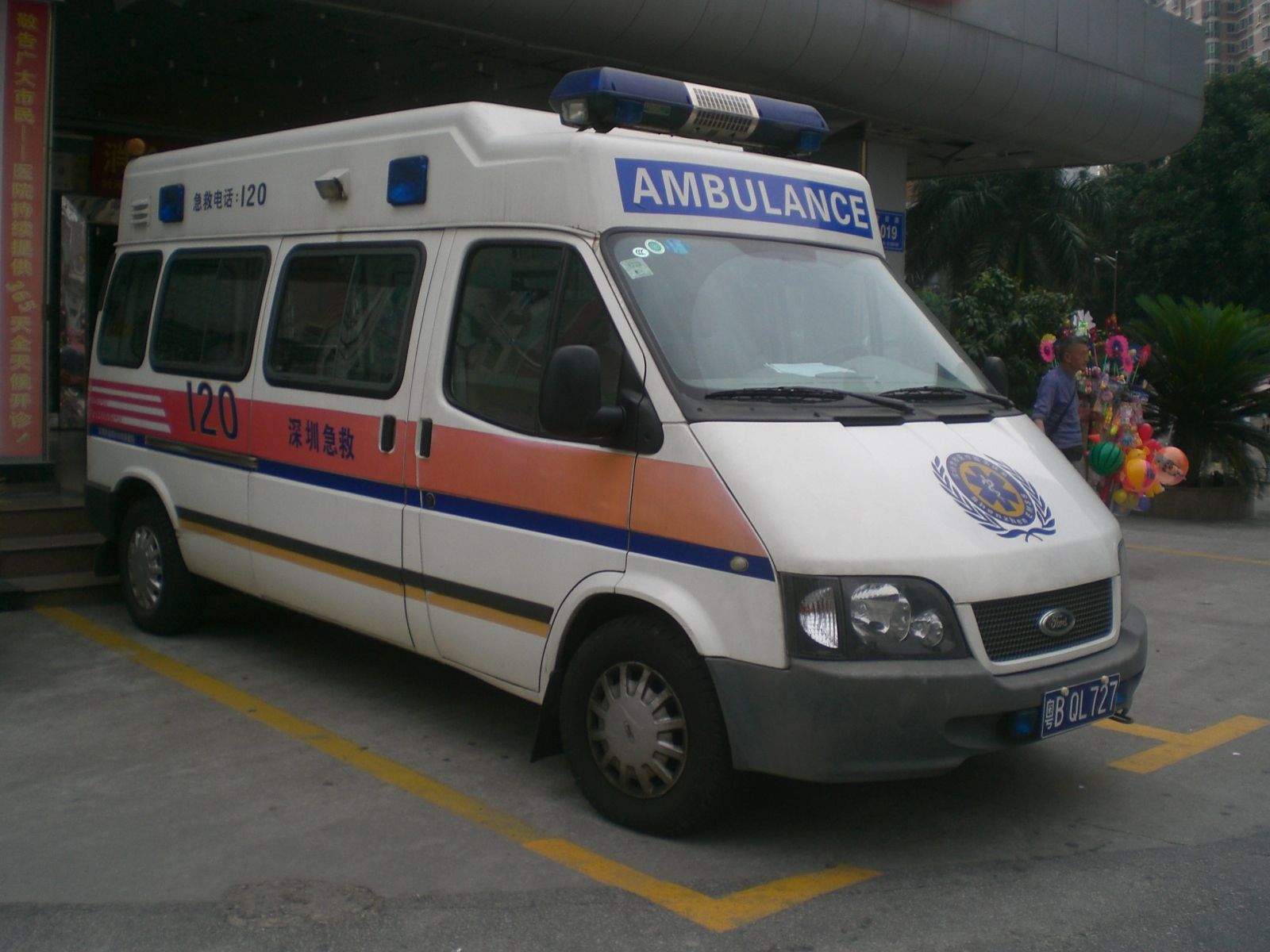
Ford/JMC Transit Classic ambulance in Shenzhen

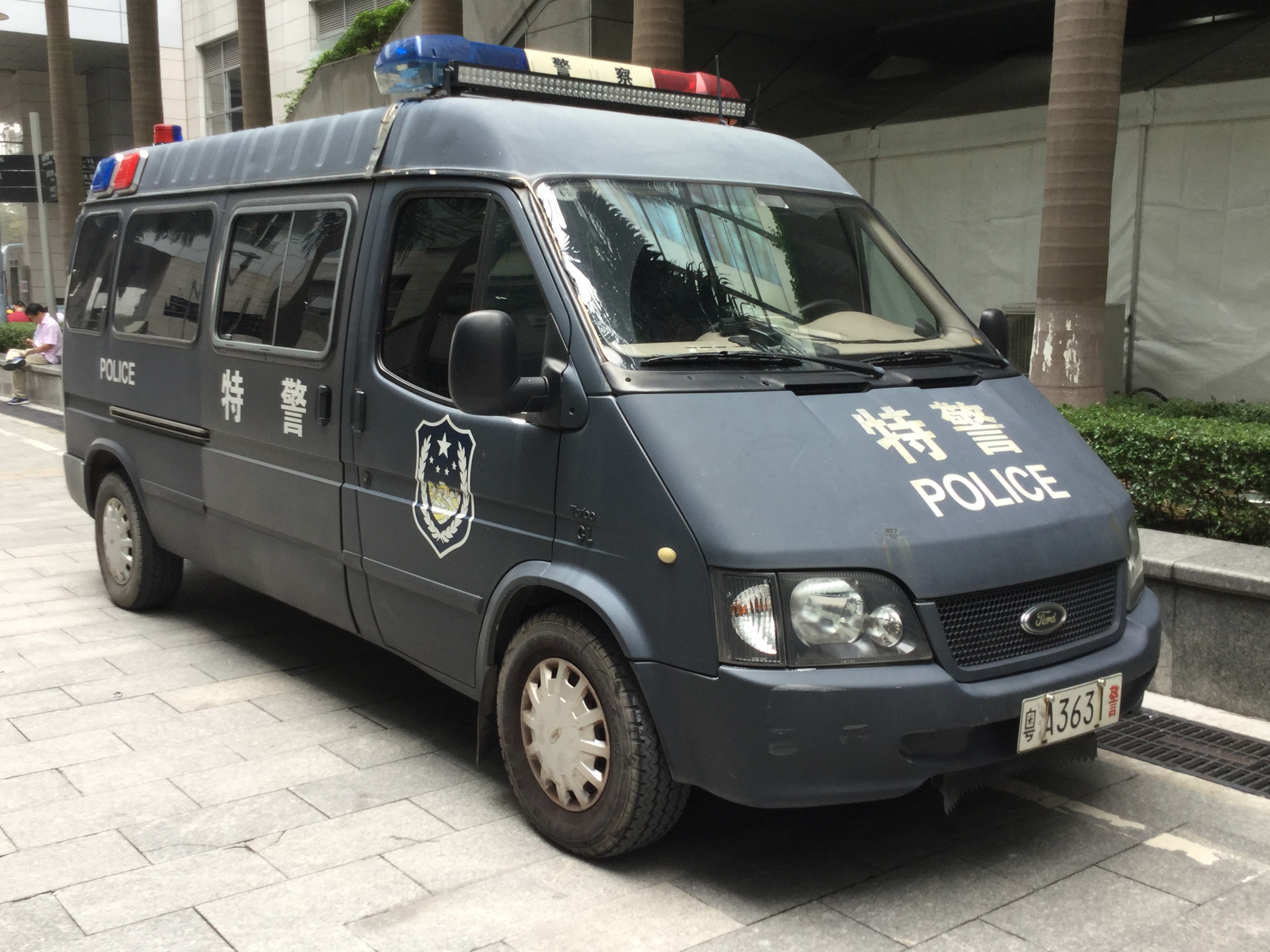
Ford-JMC Transit Classic police van (Guangzhou Public Security Police)

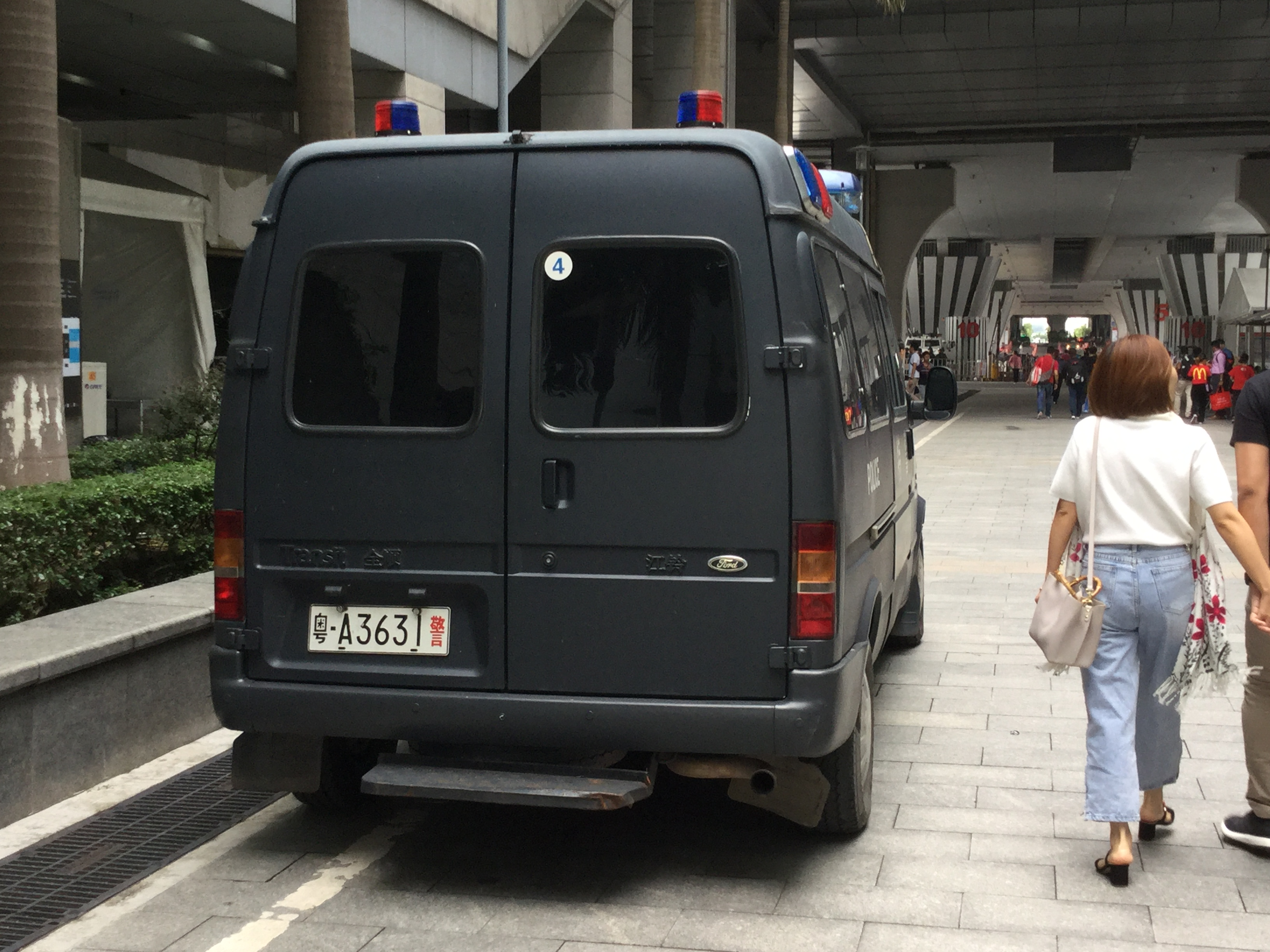
Ford-JMC Transit Classic police van, rear view

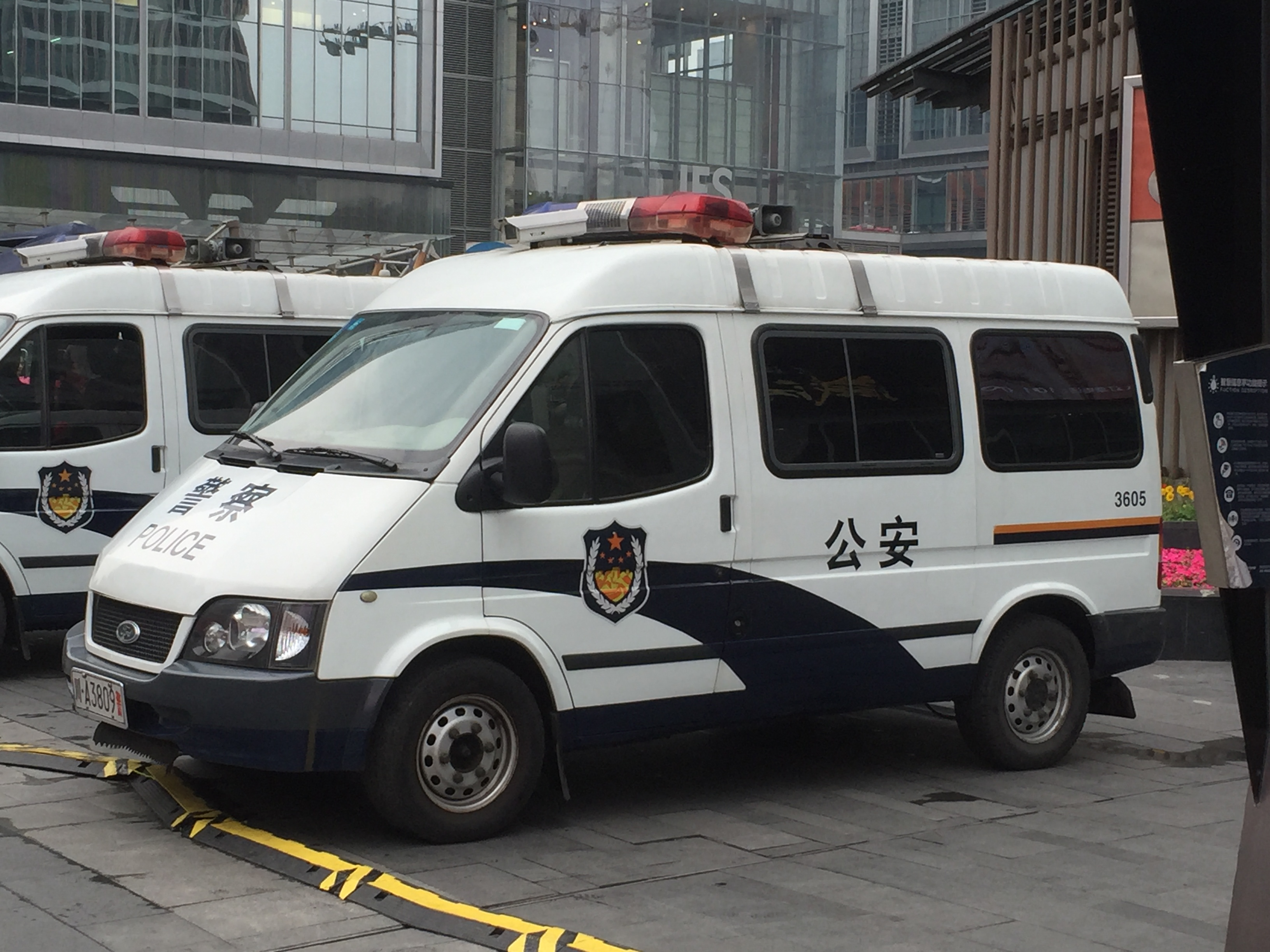
Ford-JMC Transit Classic police van (Chengdu Public Security Police)

==== JMC Teshun ====
Starting from May 2017, Jiangling Motors replaced the license-built Ford Transit with the JMC Teshun range of vans. While sharing much of its body with its predecessor, the Teshun underwent a redesign of the front fascia with a larger front bumper and grille. The interior underwent an update to the dashboard, along with the introduction of a front bench seating configuration.

Retaining the VE83 platform of the second-generation Transit, the gasoline Teshun is offered with a Mitsubishi-produced 100 kW (136 PS) and 200 N⋅m (148 lb⋅ft) 2.4 L inline-4 (Engine code: 4G69S4N) and the diesel Teshun offered with an Jiangling-produced 85 kW (116 PS) and 285 N⋅m (210 lb⋅ft), 2.8 L Turbo-diesel inline-four (engine code JX493ZLQ, essentially a modified version of the Isuzu 4JB1 engine); both engines are paired with a 5-speed manual transmission.

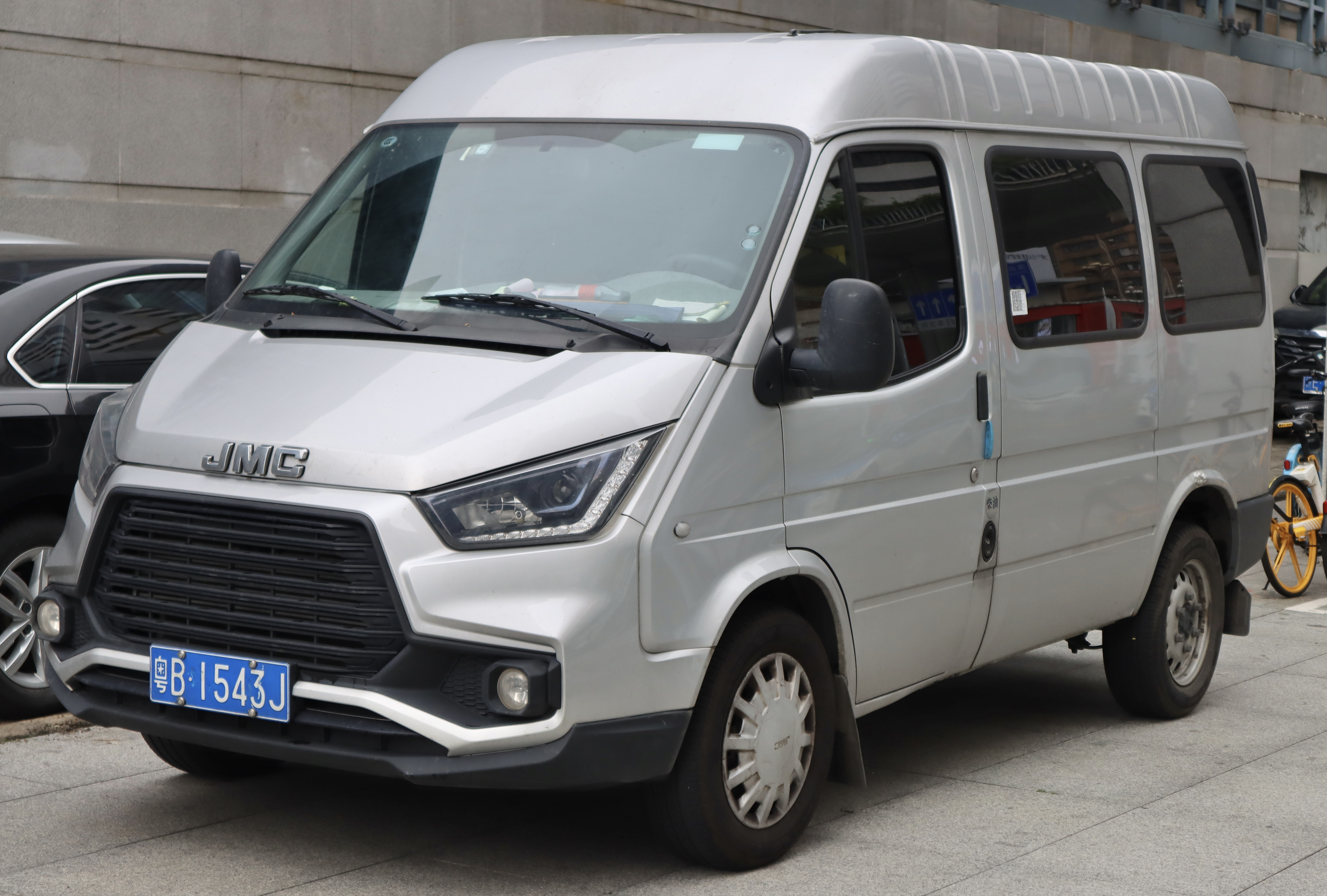
JMC Teshun

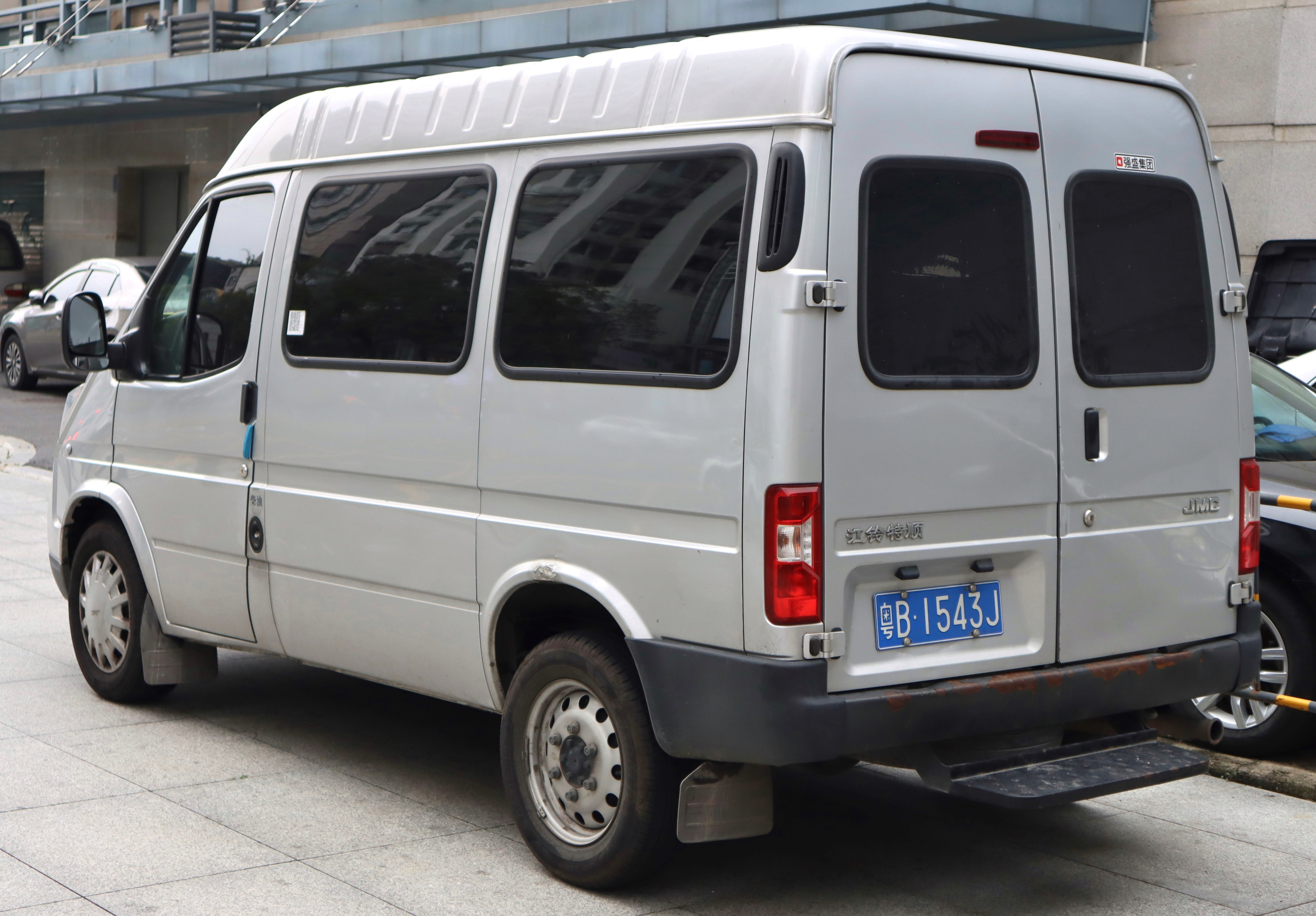
JMC Teshun, rear

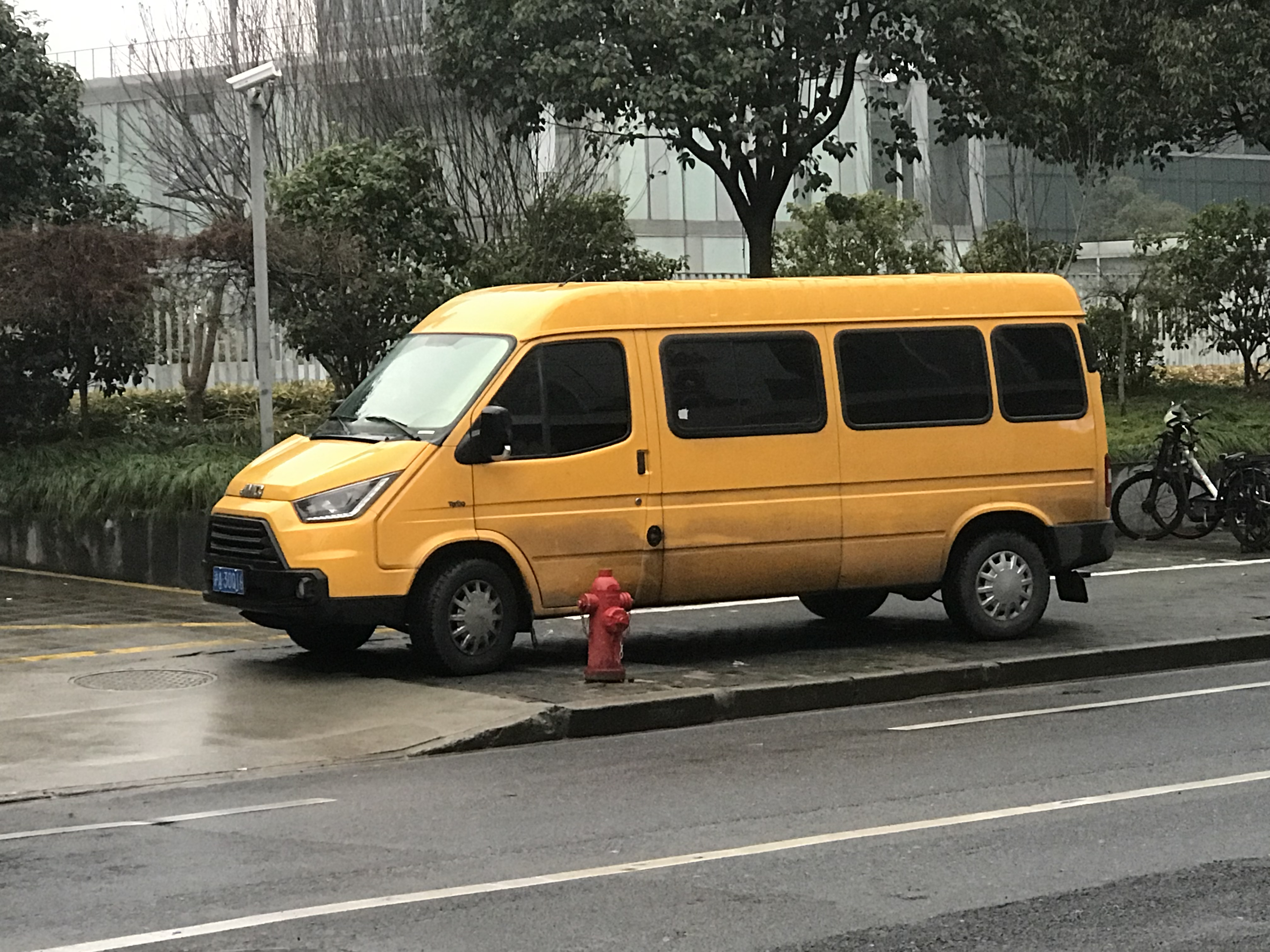
JMC Teshun long wheel base

In August 2021, a facelift of Teshun was unveiled, updates include a redesign of the front fascia, grille, headlamps, and front bumper. The rear of the car has not changed. In terms of power, the 2.4-liter gasoline engine was removed. The original 2.8L turbo-diesel inline-four engine has been upgraded to increase the output to 90 kW (122 PS) and 285 N⋅m (210 lb⋅ft).

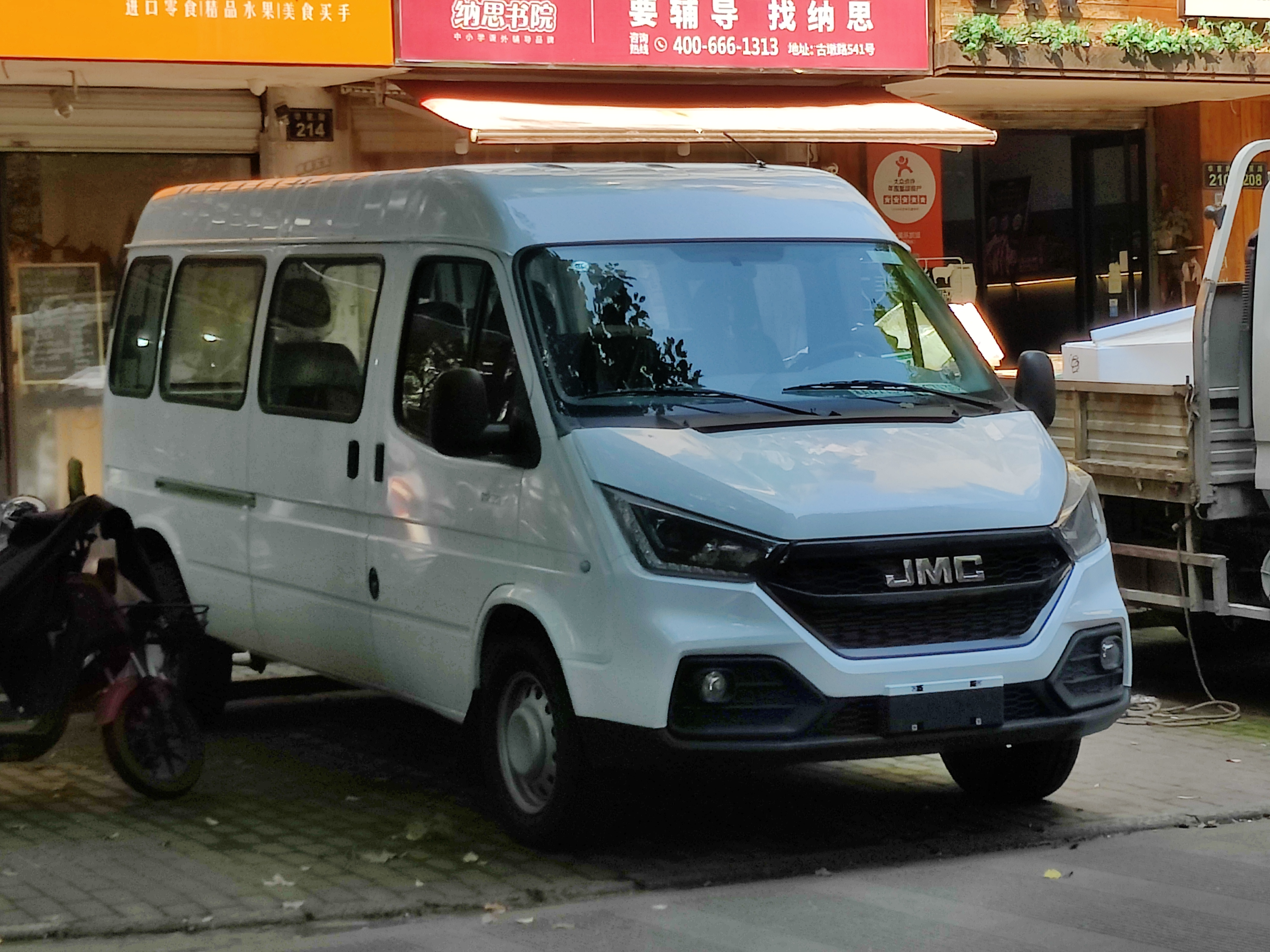
JMC Teshun Front (After facelift)

=== Third generation Transit (2009–2023) ===
The third-generation Ford Transit commenced production in China in 2008 for the 2009 model year. Engine choices consisted of the 2.2-litre turbo diesel, a 2.3-litre petrol for 2009 models and a 2.4-litre turbo diesel. The Transit in China was given a facelift for the 2013 model year onwards with new headlights and taillights. From 2019 to 2023, the 2.2-litre turbo diesel engine and 6 speed manual gearbox is standard across the range.

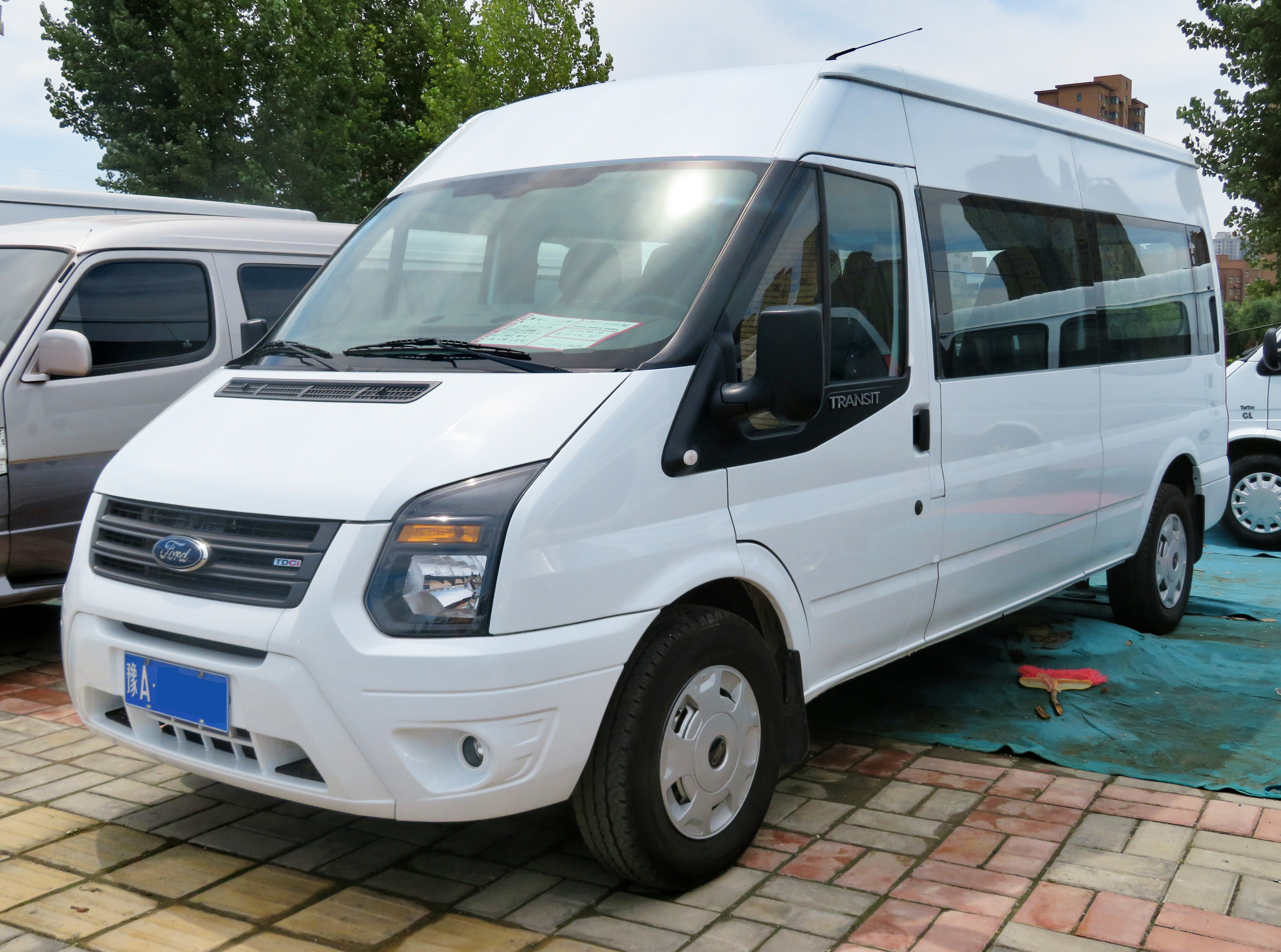
2013 facelift

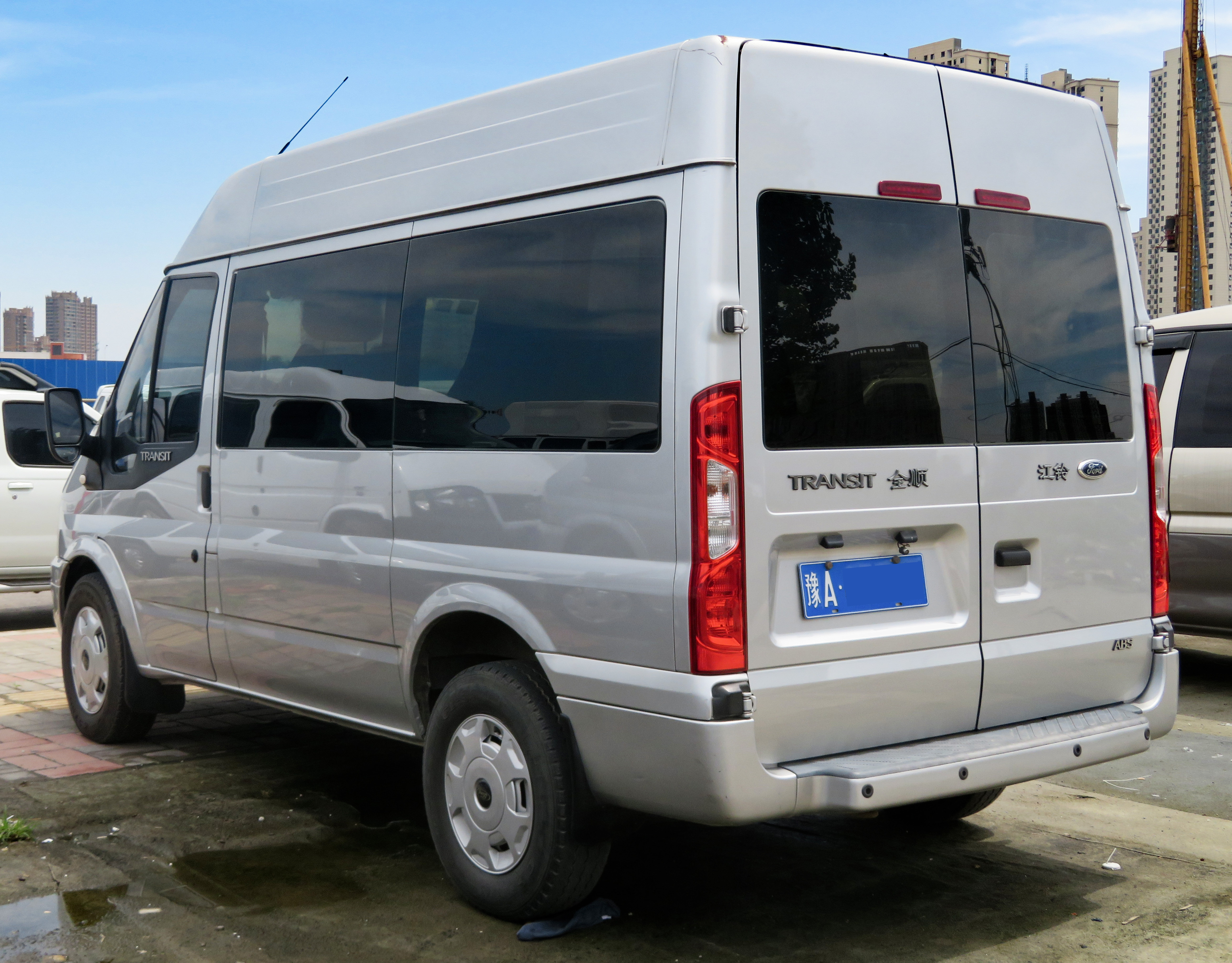
2013 facelift (rear)

==== 2021 Ford Transit Pro ====
The model line received a facelift for 2021 production, unveiled as the Ford Transit Pro at the 2020 Beijing Auto Show. Distinguished by a restyled front end and restyled taillamps, the revision included an updated powertrain to fulfill the National Standard VI emissions standard in China. The updated engine is a 140 kW (190 PS) and 360 N⋅m (266 lb⋅ft) 2.2-litre diesel engine paired to a 6-speed manual transmission.

The Transit Pro was also manufactured and sold in Vietnam as the Ford Transit in 2022, powered by a 100 kW (136 PS) 2.2L turbodiesel engine, also using a 6-speed manual transmission.

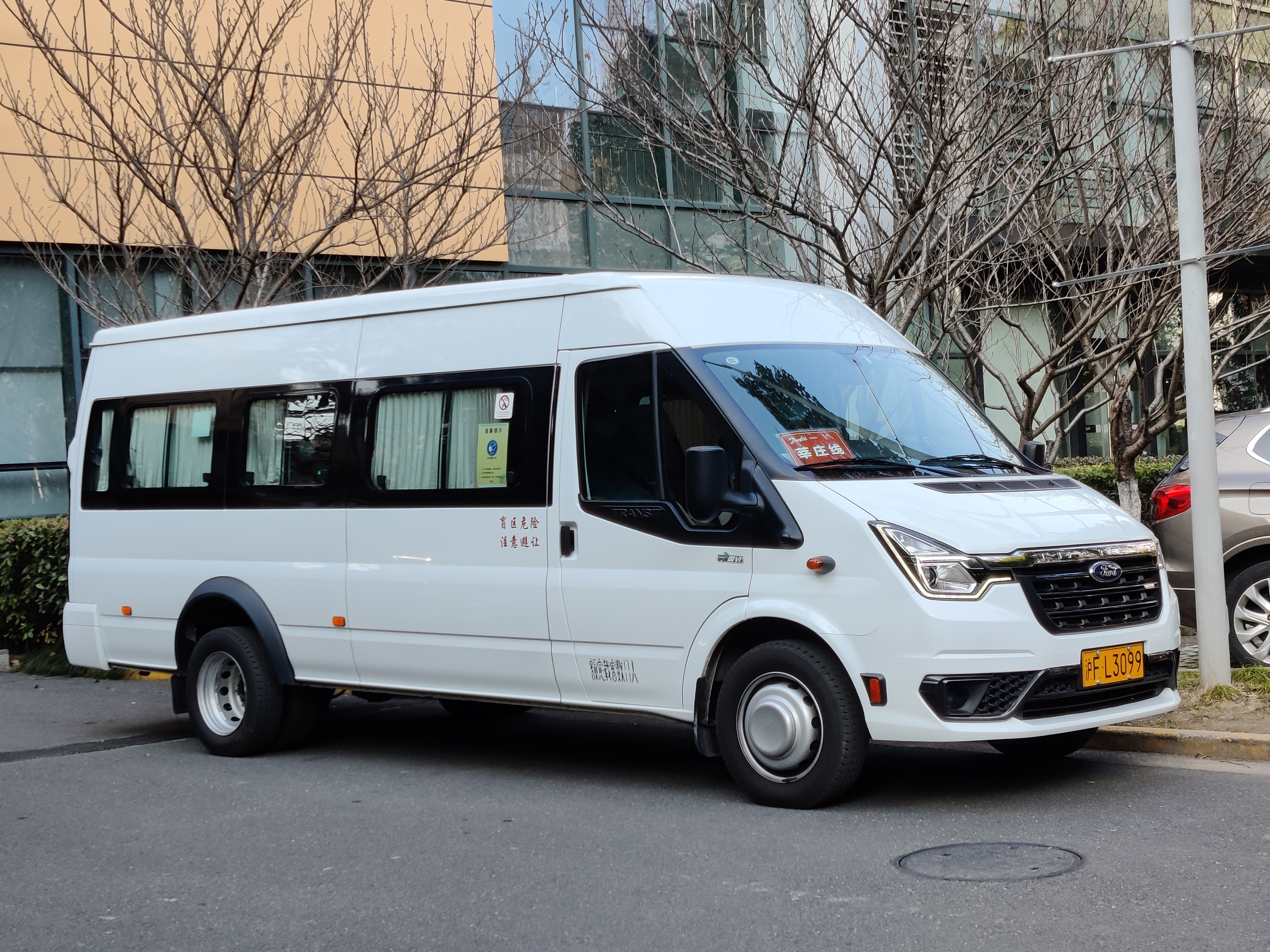
2021 Ford Transit Pro

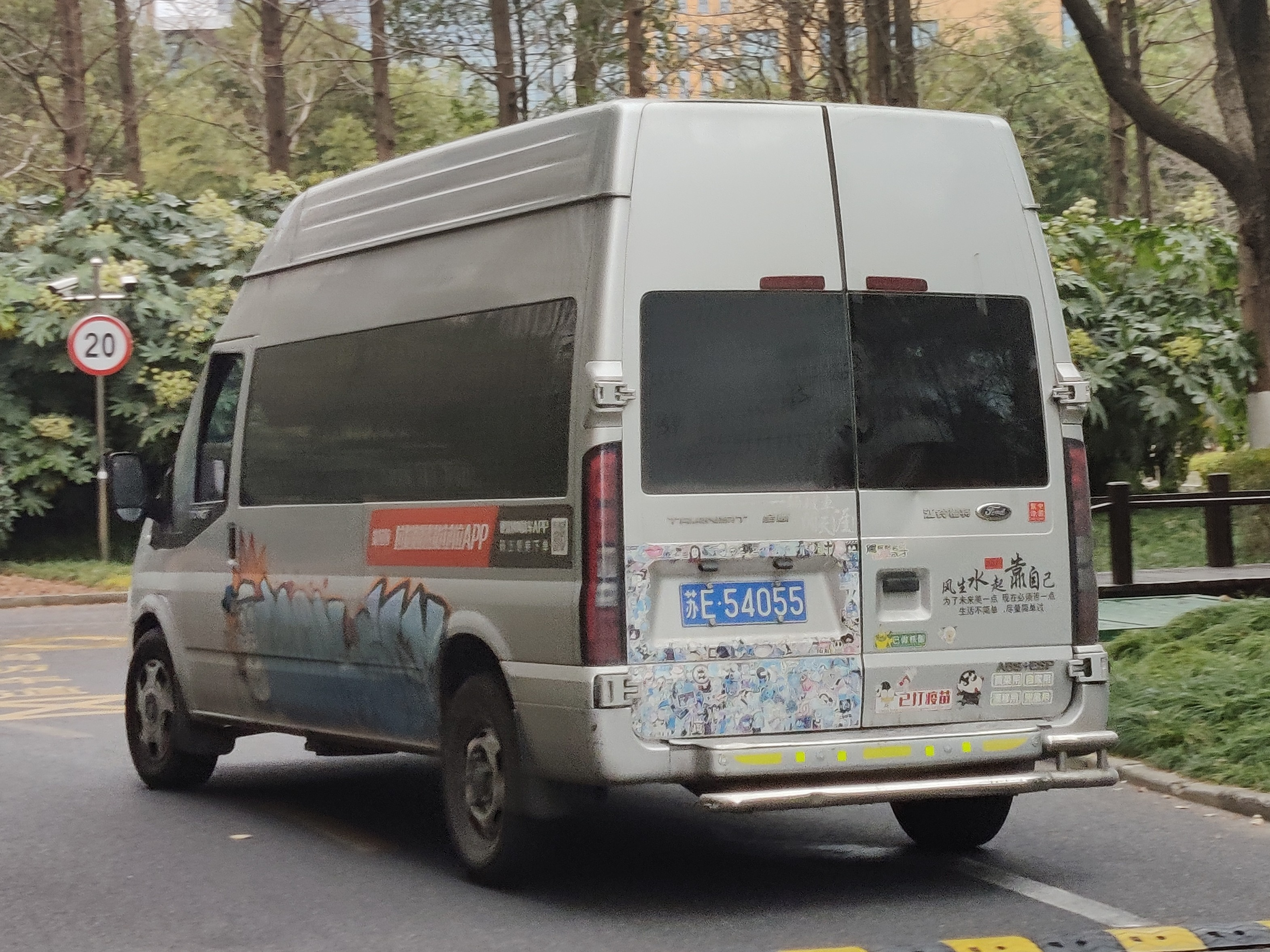
2021 Ford Transit Pro (rear)

==== 2022 JMC Fushun ====
In mid-2022, Jiangling Motors released the JMC Fushun based on the Transit Pro. According to the official data, the model was equipped with a 2.0-litre inline-four turbodiesel engine (engine code JX4D20A6H, a modified Ford ZSD-420 engine) with an output of 107 kW (146 PS) and 355 N⋅m (262 lb⋅ft) paired with a 6-speed manual transmission.

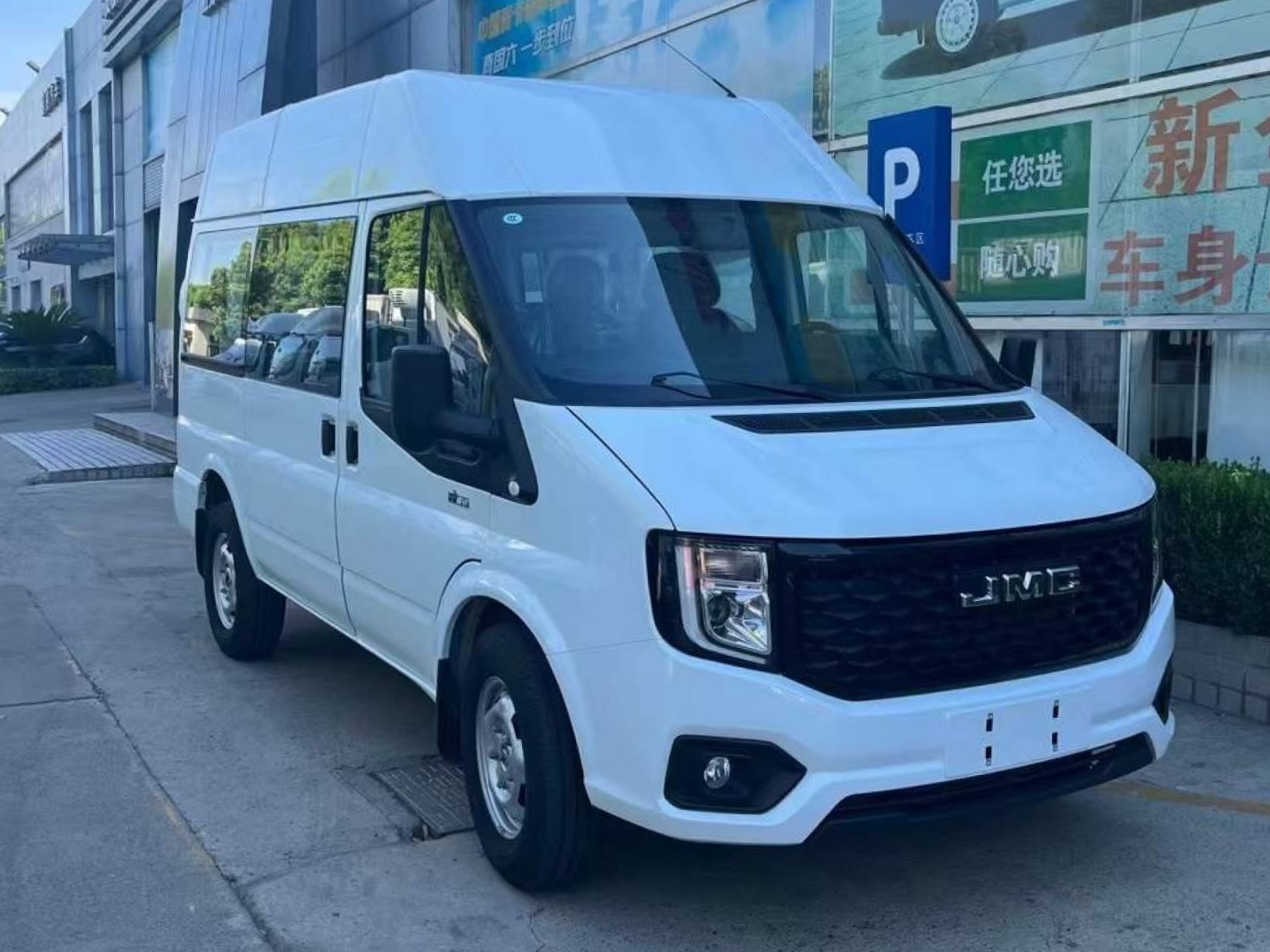
JMC Fushun

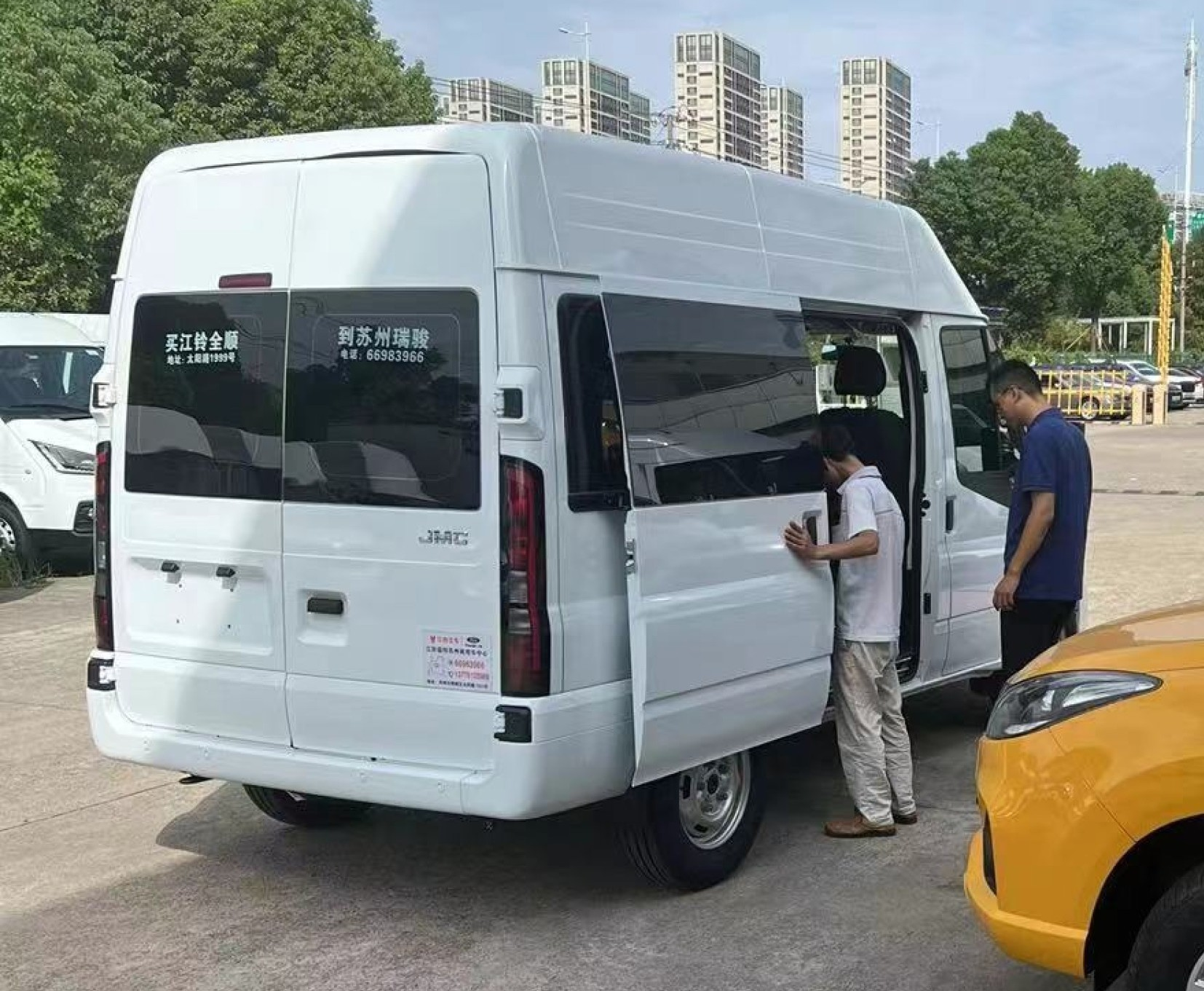
JMC Fushun (rear)

JMC Fushun 2026 facelift in police livery

=== Transit T8 (2023-present) ===
In August 2023, the fourth-generation Ford Transit was introduced to the Chinese market for the first time by JMC Ford. Restyled and named the Transit T8, the vehicle was originally codenamed Transit V363. Currently, JMC Ford offers the Transit T8 with either an electric motor or two different diesel engines: either the 2.3L turbo fifth generation Ford Puma diesel engine or a 2.0L turbodiesel engine. A 6-speed manual transmission option is available alongside an 8-speed automatic option.

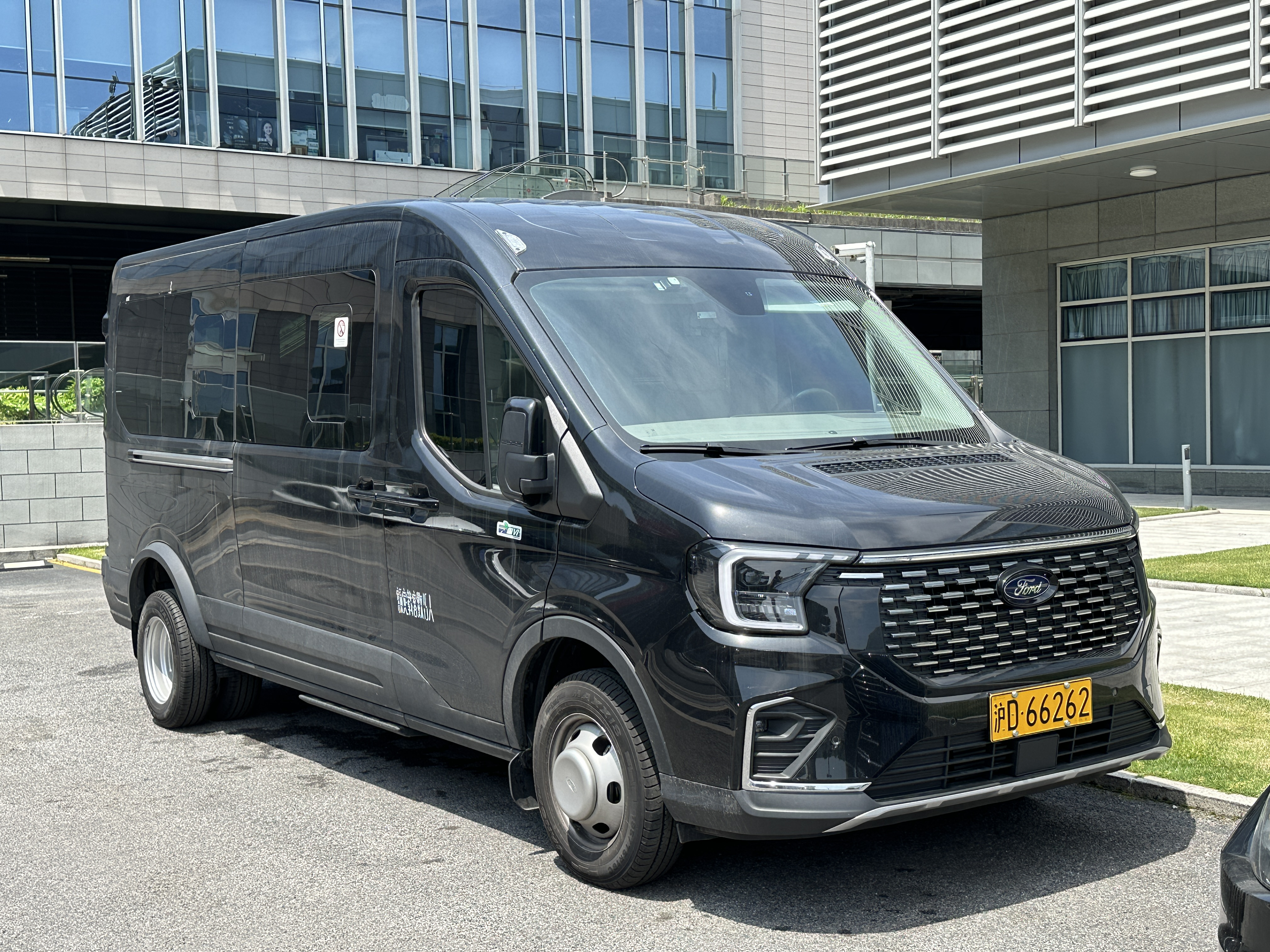
Ford Transit T8

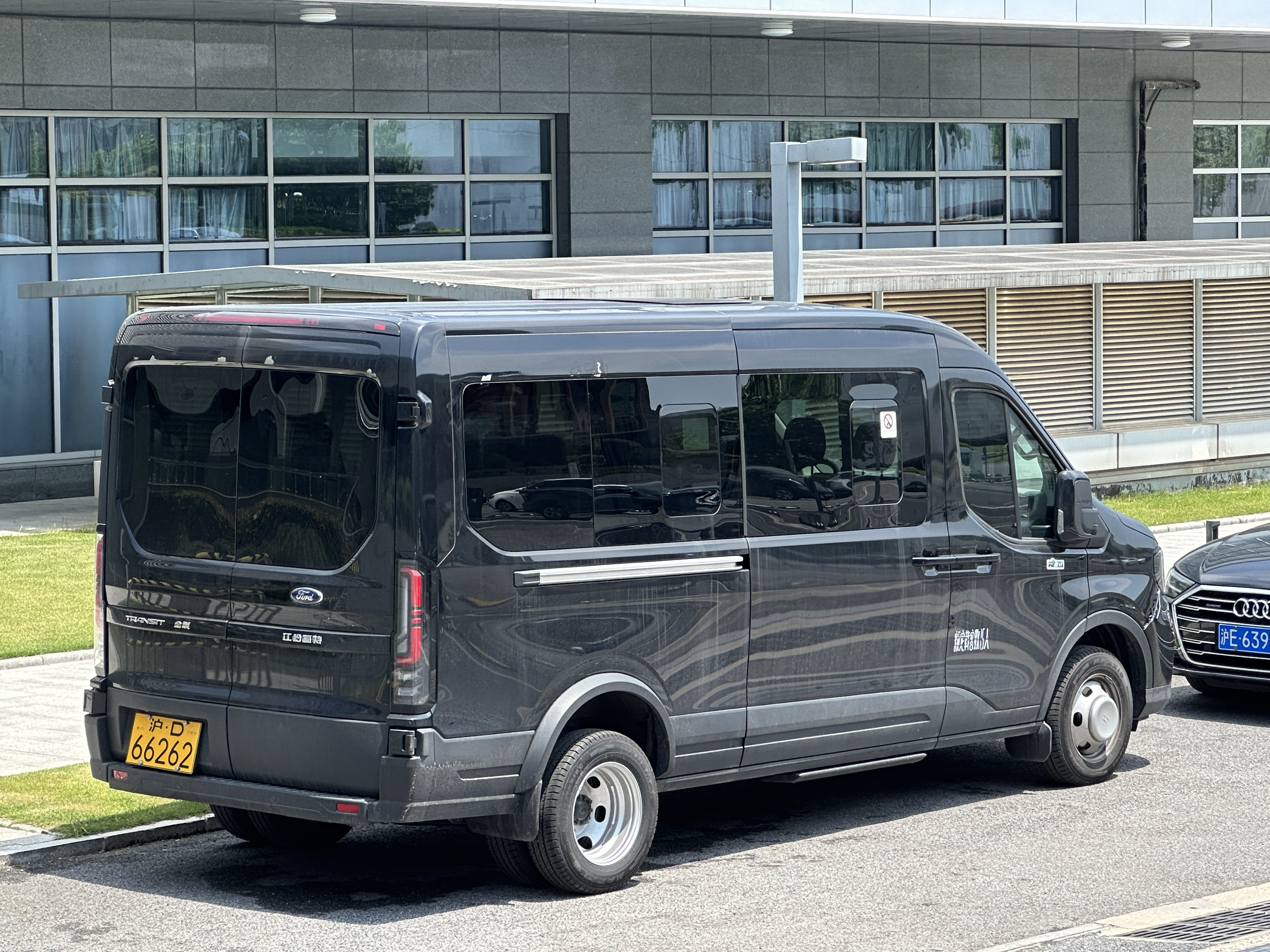
Ford Transit T8 (rear)

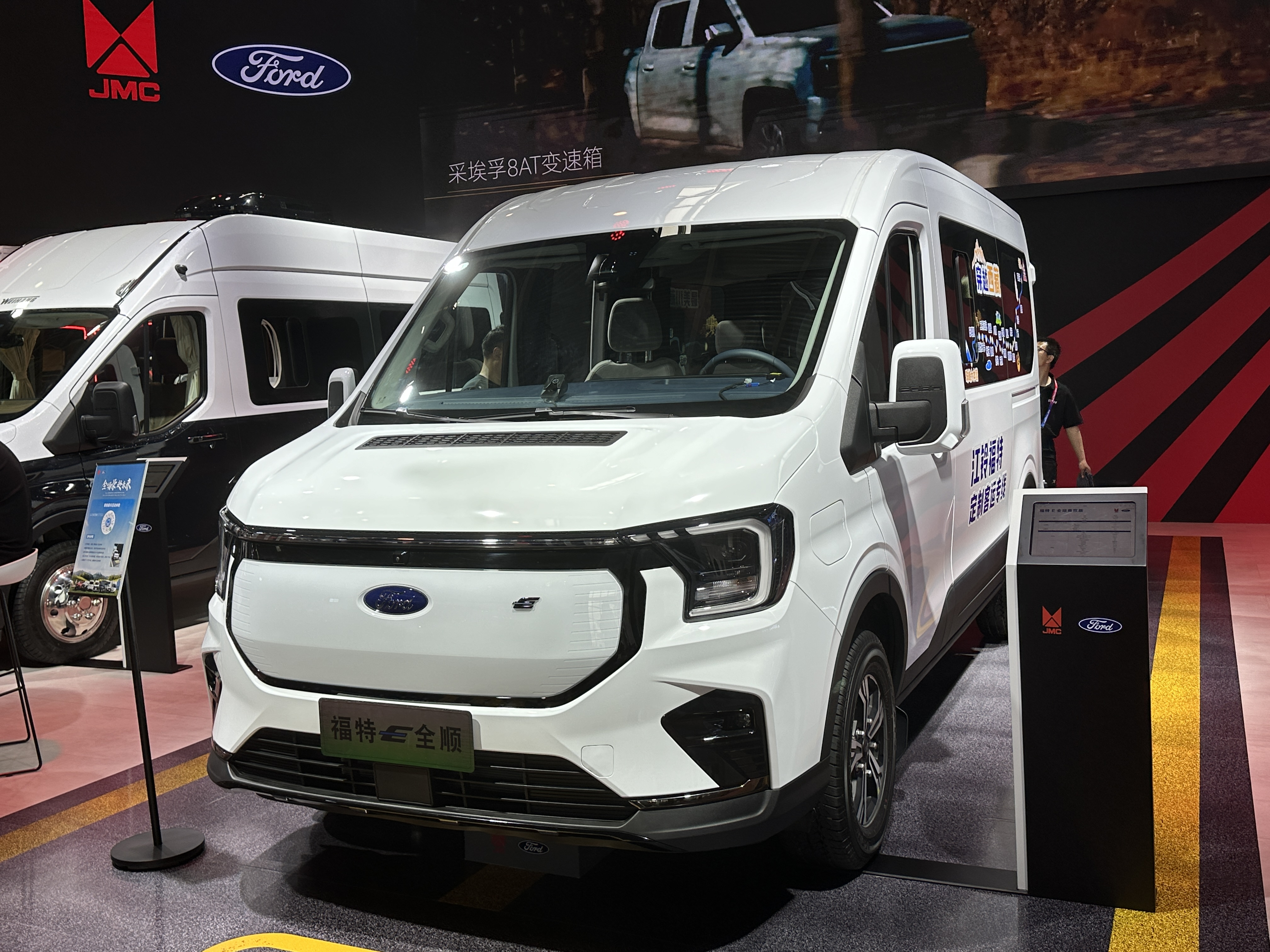
Ford E-Transit

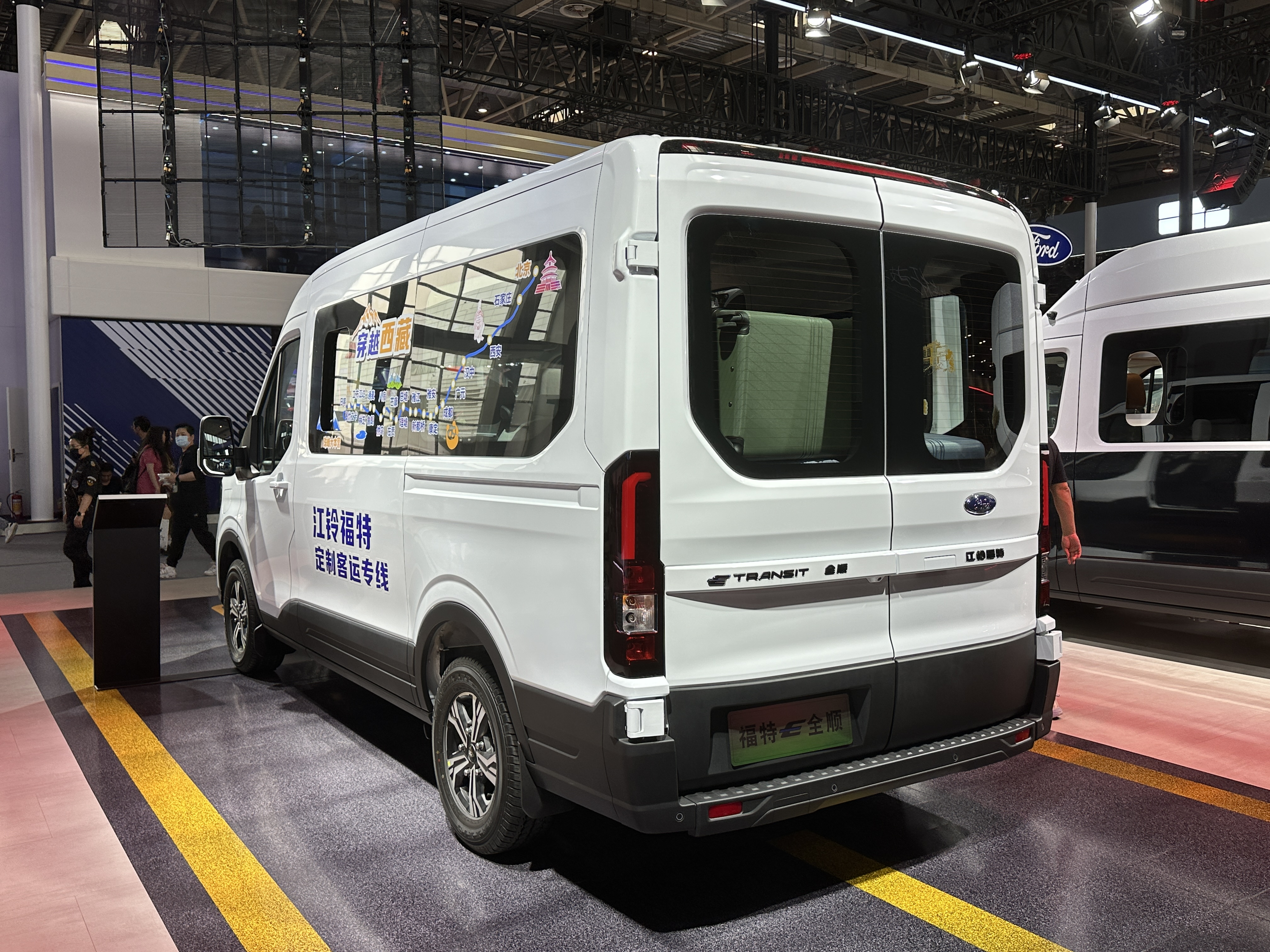
Ford E-Transit (rear)

=== Ford Transit City (2026-present) ===
In 2026, Ford, partnering with Jiangling Motors, will release the Transit City. It is a battery electric van that is related to the JMC E-Fushun.

== Variants ==
=== Tourneo ===
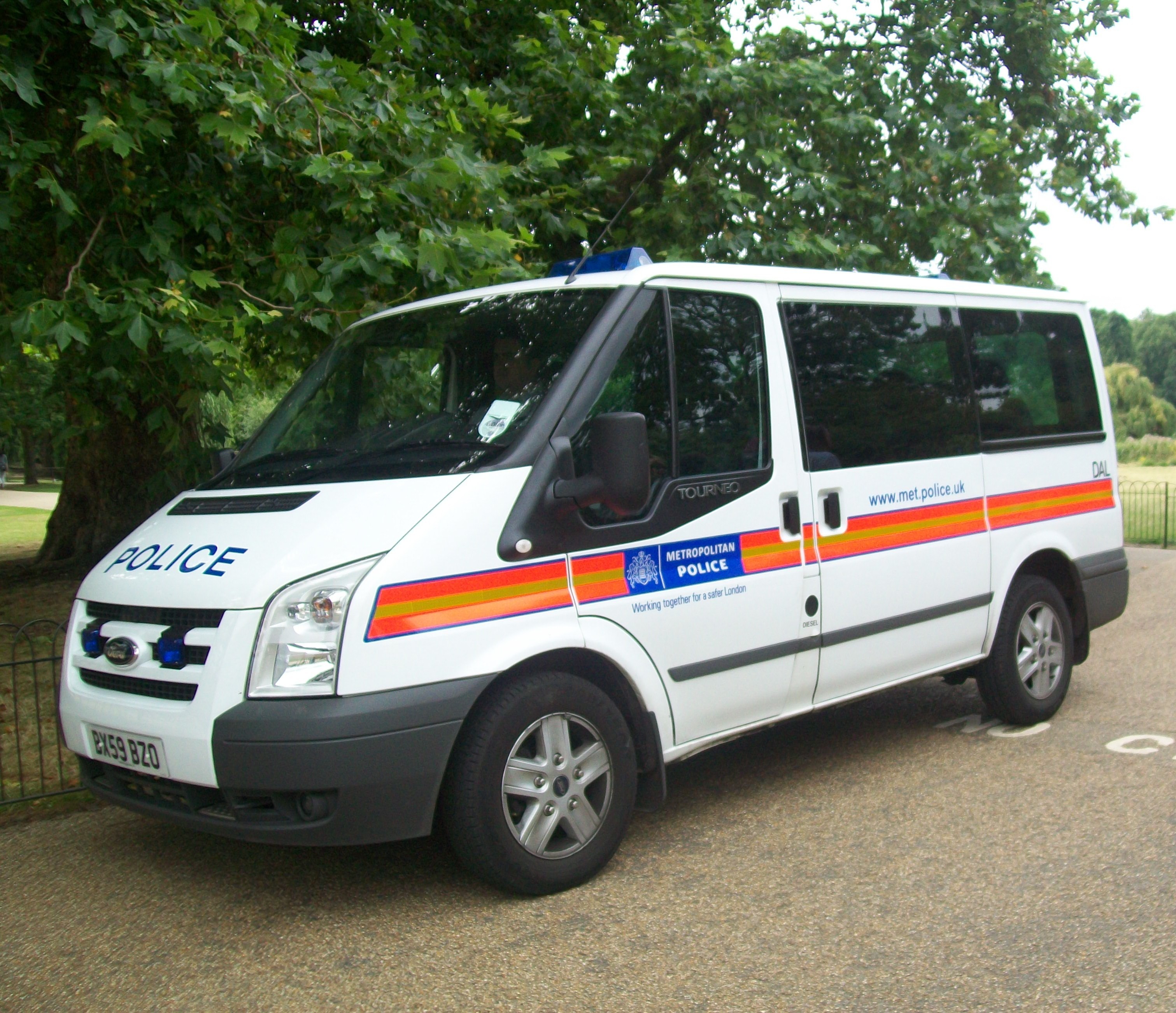
Ford Tourneo with Metropolitan Police, based on the third generation Transit

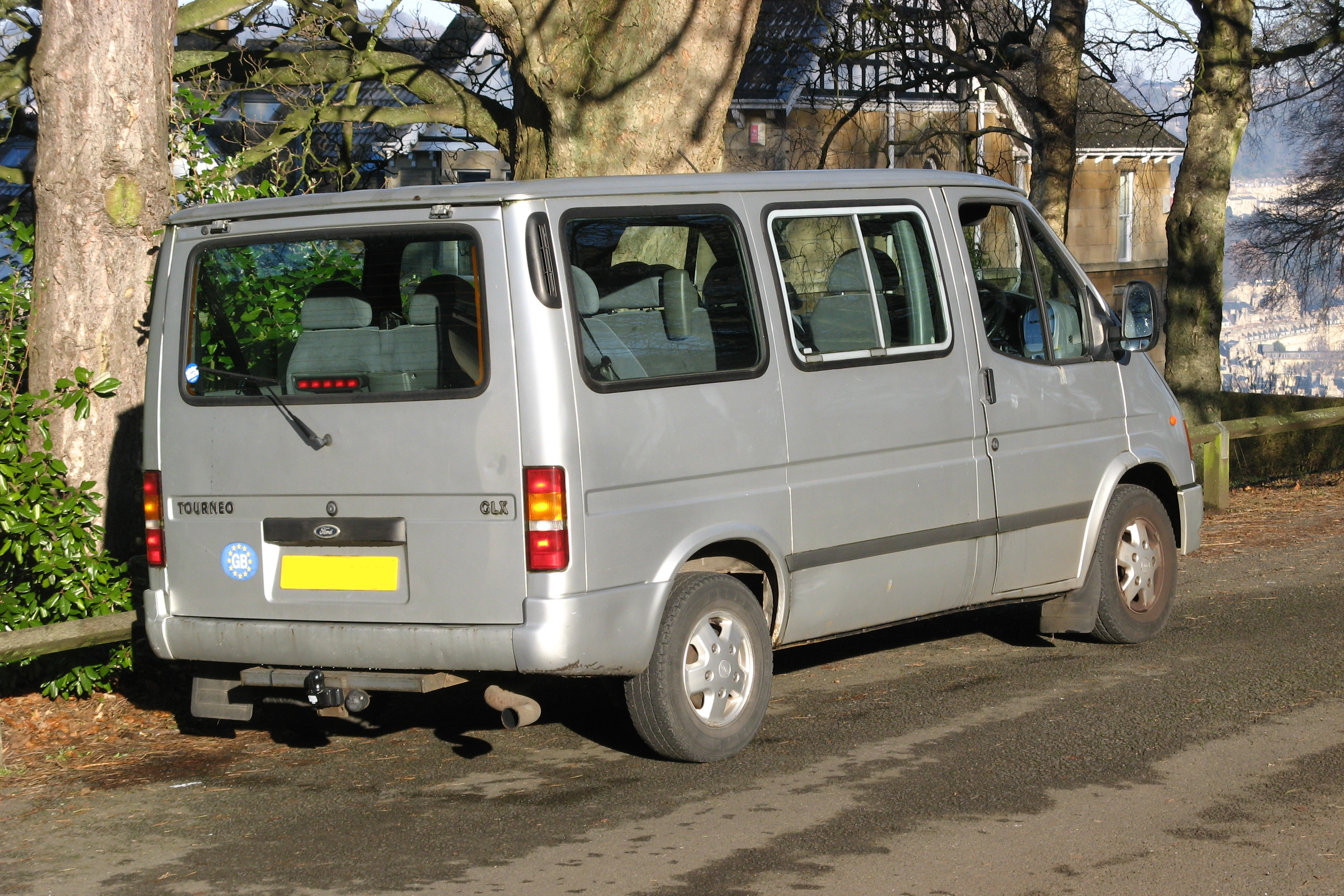
Ford Tourneo based on the second generation Transit

Introduced as part of the 1994 redesign of the Transit, the Tourneo is a Transit-based 8 or 9-seat minibus, but over the years has become increasingly better trimmed up to the point where it can almost be classified as a large MPV. Featuring back seats, back windows, and tailgate similar to a minivan, the Tourneo is also considered an executive transport vehicle and is often supplied with alloy wheels. Since its introduction, the Tourneo has followed the same development cycle as the Transit; both versions receive updates at the same time.

A smaller MPV version of the Tourneo was introduced in 2002; branded the Tourneo Connect, it was based on the Transit Connect mini MPV.

The version based on the fourth generation Transit is marketed as the Ford Tourneo Custom, and from 2019 has a plug-in hybrid engine option.

=== County 4×4 ===
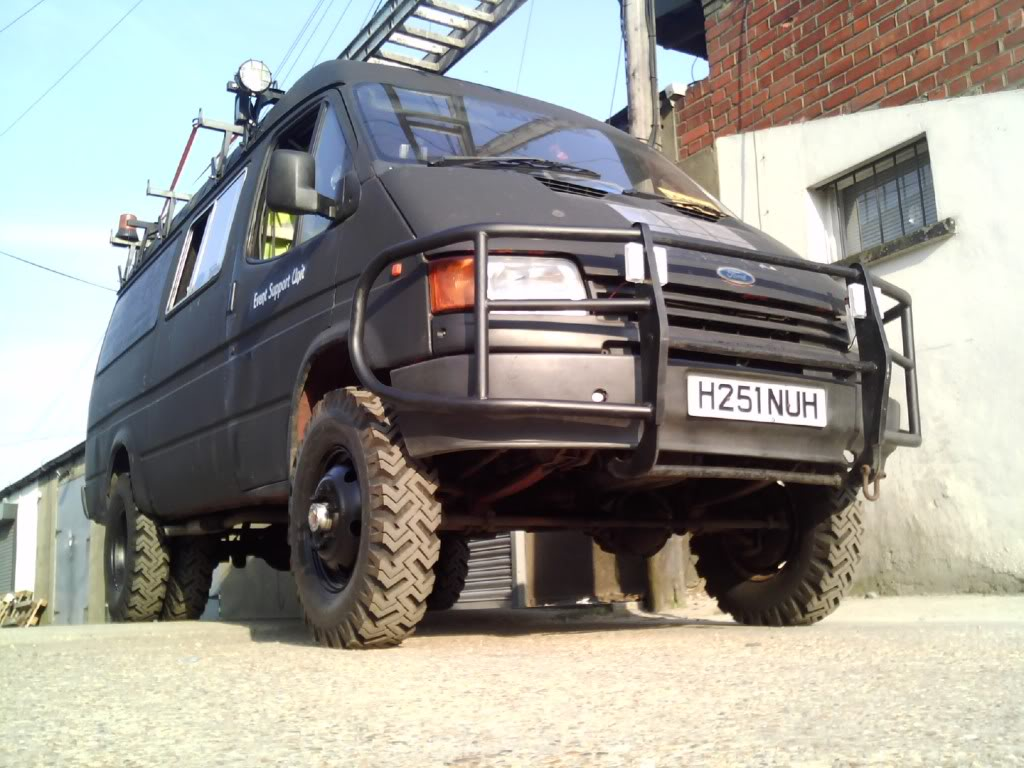
Mk3 County 4×4 Transit

A handful of companies offered four-wheel-drive conversions, such as County Tractors of Knighton in Powys, Wales who converted vans on behalf of Ford as a Special Vehicle Operations factory option. The first Transit County models were based on the Mk2 Transit model, both long and short wheelbase. The conversion used a Dana 44F front axle and a NP208 transfer box, both lifted from the Ford Bronco, coupled to the regular Transit engine, gearbox and rear axle using three custom propshafts. The Transit rear axle was retained, mounted to a rear subframe or 'lift cradle' to give the extra ride height. Other modifications were 16-inch wheel rims, locking front hubs, a heavy-duty steering box and 305 mm diameter front brake discs.

With the introduction of the Mk3 Transit in 1986 came the next generation of the County 4×4. This would prove to be a very popular and successful version of the County Transit 4×4, and the last to use the Dana beam axle layout. Later County 4×4 models switched to using an independent front suspension setup which was inherently more complex in design than the earlier beam axle models. Later panel vans also lost the twin-wheel rear axle that had been fitted on earlier LWB versions.

Mainly used by utility companies such as National Grid (UK), the Ministry of Defence (UK), and by mountain rescue teams, the Transit County 4×4 proved to be a capable vehicle both on and off-road, with the ability to carry both crew and equipment just about anywhere.

Design and supply of drivetrain components for County 4×4 models passed to Countytrac, a division of M.J. Allen Ltd, who are still involved in the development of the latest Mk7 AWD Transit and Connect models.

=== Transit Trail ===
The Ford Transit Trail is an off-road AWD motorhome version of the van and comes with a 310 hp (230 kW) twin-turbo V6 engine and all-wheel drive.

=== Transit Custom ===
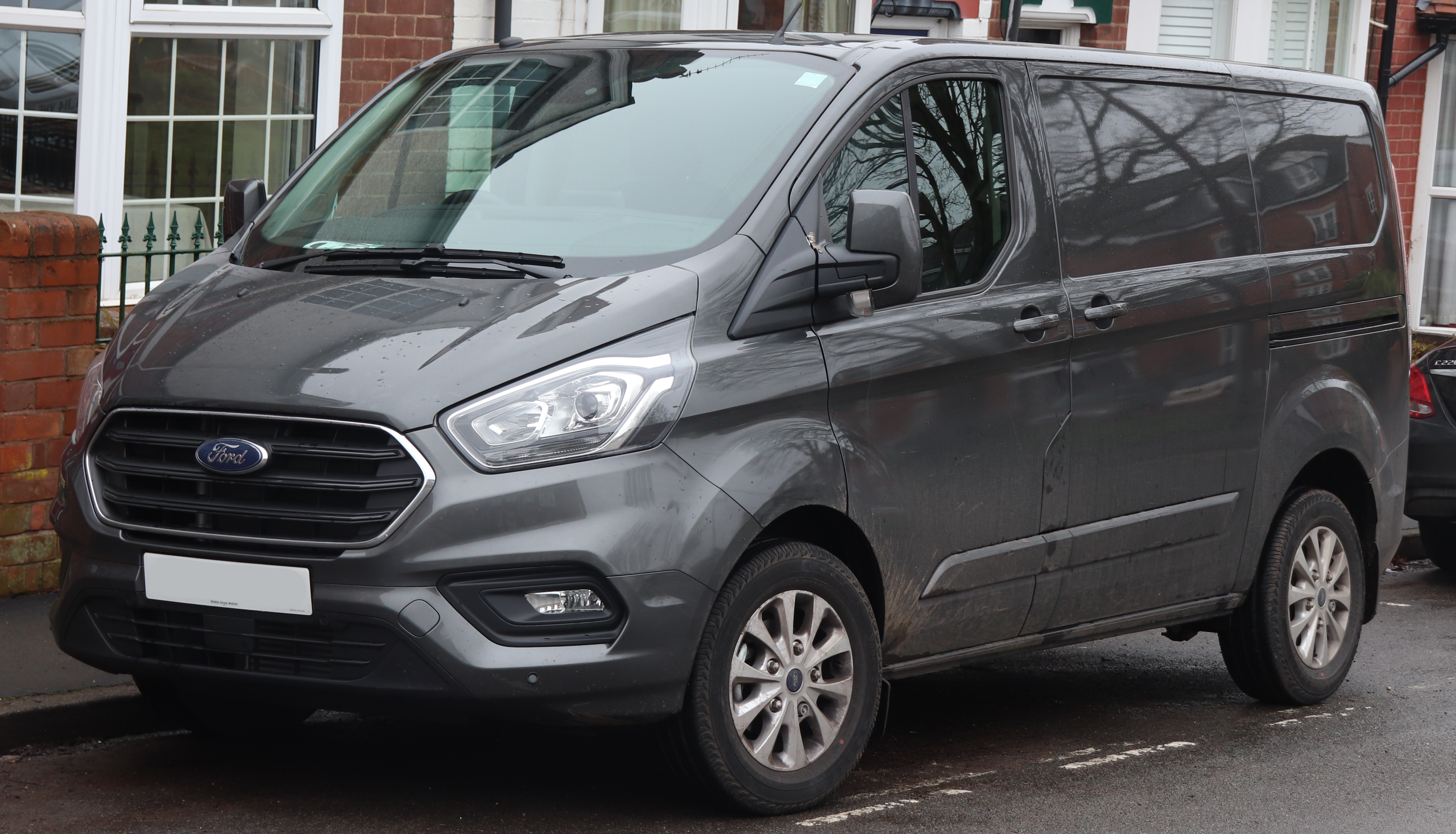
2018 Ford Transit Custom 300 Limited

Replacing the previous front-wheel drive Transit/Tourneo, the Ford Transit Custom is a mid-size cargo and passenger van. Competing against the Mercedes-Benz Vito/Viano, Peugeot Expert, Renault Trafic and Volkswagen Transporter, the Custom is offered in two body lengths and two roof heights. Offered in most worldwide markets, the Transit Custom is not currently sold in the United States and Canada; it is sold in Mexico (where the predecessor front-wheel-drive Transit replaced the Freestar minivan).

For 2018 production, the model line received an exterior update, distinguished by a new grille (in line with the larger Transit); the interior received a new dashboard (styled in line with the Fiesta).

=== XXL ===
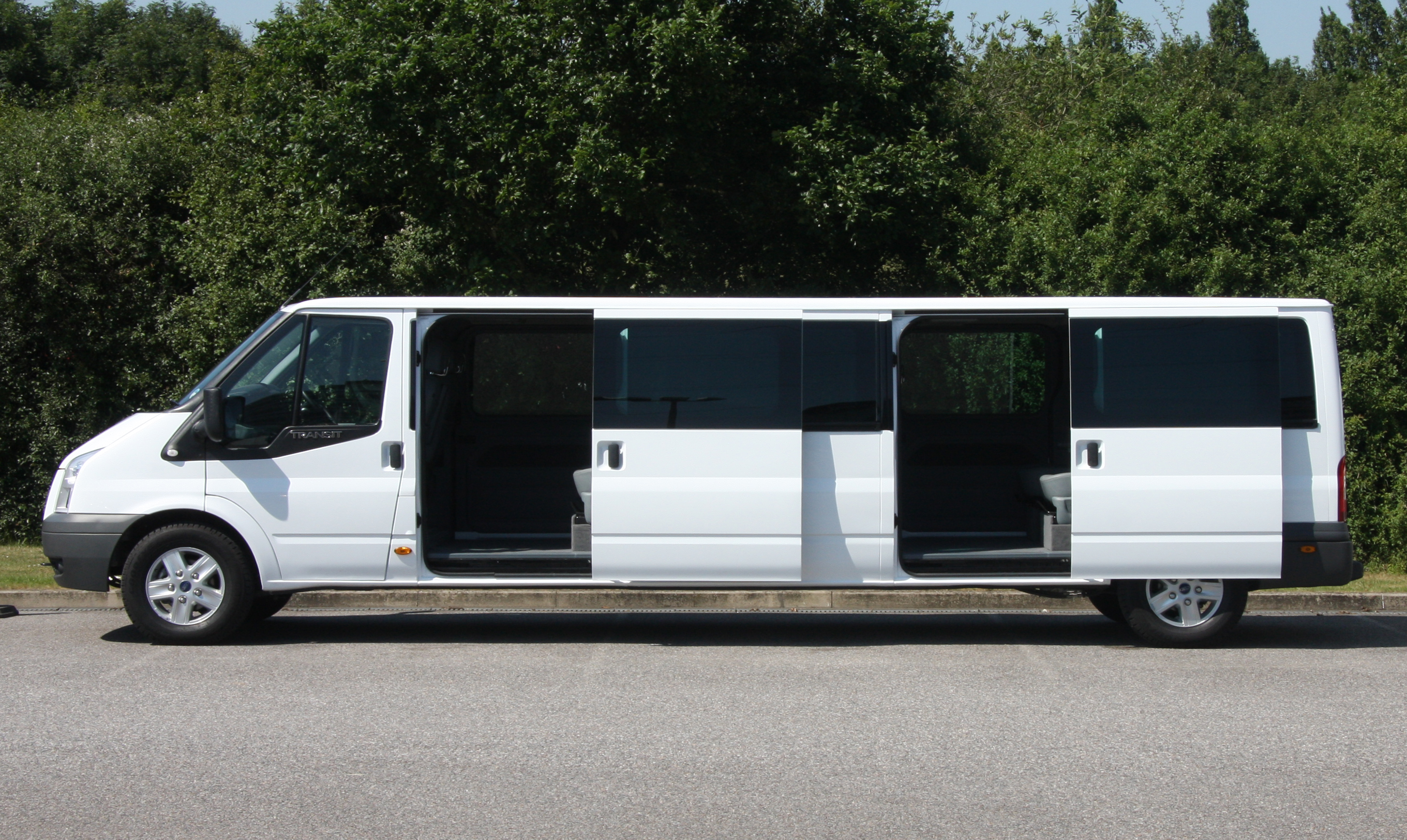
Ford Transit XXL

To celebrate the Transit's status as International Van of the Year 2007, Ford built a stretch limousine style van – the Transit XXL. This version is the most expensive Transit ever made.

=== SuperSportVan ===
The Ford Transit SuperSportVan was a one-off, high-performance version of the third-gen Transit built by Ford Europe. It uses a 3.2L turbocharged Duratorq I5, producing 198 horsepower, borrowed from a larger Transit model, mated to a 6-speed transmission.
