= Cunliffe-Owen =

Cunliffe-Owen is a surname, and may refer to:

- Sir Philip Cunliffe-Owen (1828–1894), English exhibition organizer and museum director
- Sir Hugo Cunliffe-Owen (1870–1947), English tobacco industrialist
- Frederick Cunliffe-Owen (1855–1926), British-born American journalist
- Cunliffe-Owen baronets, a title in the Baronetage of the United Kingdom created in 1920 for Hugo Cunliffe-Owen

== See also ==
- Cunliffe-Owen Aircraft, a British aircraft manufacturer of the World War II era founded by Hugo Cunliffe-Owen
