= Swaythling and Bassett Covenant of Churches =

Ecumenical group of churches in England

The Swaythling and Bassett Covenant of Churches is an ecumenical group made up of the following churches:

- All Saints' Church, Bassett
- Church of the Immaculate Conception
- Swaythling Baptist Church
- Swaythling Methodist Church, Burgess Road
- St. Alban's, Burgess Road
- St. Mary's, South Stoneham
- St. Nicolas', North Stoneham
- St. Michael and All Angels, Bassett Avenue

Bassett and Swaythling are districts of Southampton.
