= Grade II listed buildings in Southampton: A–B =

In total there are 317 listed buildings in the city of Southampton, of which 14 are Grade I, 20 are Grade II* and the remainder Grade II.

In England, a building or structure is defined as "listed" when it is placed on a statutory register of buildings of "special architectural or historic interest" by the Secretary of State for Culture, Media and Sport, a Government department, in accordance with the Planning (Listed Buildings and Conservation Areas) Act 1990. English Heritage, a non-departmental public body, acts as an agency of this department to administer the process and advise the department on relevant issues. There are three grades of listing status. The Grade II designation is the lowest, and is used for "nationally important buildings of special interest". Grade II* is used for "particularly important buildings of more than special interest", while Grade I (defined as being of "exceptional interest" and greater than national importance), is the highest of the three grades.

This list summarises 48 Grade II-listed buildings and structures whose names begin with A or B. Numbered buildings with no individual name are listed by the name of the street on which they stand.

== Listed buildings ==
Name	Photograph	Date	Location^{[A]}	Description^{[B]}	Link to Historic England database^{[C]}	Link to British Listed Buildings database^{[D]}
286 (Swaythling Methodist Church)		1932	SU4330315583; 50.9381°N 1.3851°W	Designed by Herbert Collins in a neo-Georgian style, the main auditorium is octagonal with a balcony over the entrance porch; the balcony is accessible via two stair towers on the north face. Attached to the south side is a wing containing other halls and rooms. Separate buildings on the west of the site contain some workshops and the manse. The roof of the main hall is shallowly domed and clad in copper, topped by a copper-clad cupola.		
Admiralty House	Admiralty House	1902	SU4235510957; 50.8966°N 1.3991°W	Now converted into apartments, this building was originally the main Post Office for Southampton Docks.^{[E]} Described as "Wrennaissance" style, this is a three-storey red brick building with stone dressings under a hipped slate roof. It comprises a projecting central section with a curved open pediment and projecting sections at each end with triangular open pediments. The central section has pilasters at each side with two pairs of engaged columns through the first and second floors supporting the pediment. At the centre of the second floor, there is a tall arched window flanked by Tuscan columns and pilasters surmounted by an open triangular pediment. The end sections have pairs of pilasters at each side running through the first and second floors, with second floor windows similar to those in the central section. On the second floor, there are five sash windows in each of the linking sections and two pairs in the central section. On the first floor, there are twelve sash windows in total, in Gibbs surrounds. On the end sections of the ground floor, there are doorcases set in round-headed arches with coupled engaged Tuscan columns. The central section has a large semi-circular window. The other eight ground floor windows are round-headed with keystones.		
Aldermoor Farmhouse		early to mid-19th century	SU3965415816; 50.9404°N 1.4370°W	Southampton City Council state: "The house known as Aldermoor Lodge (later Aldermoor House) was built in 1800". The building is a two-storey L-shaped house of painted brickwork. The farm is close to Tanners Brook which flows past Shirley Pond to Millbrook and then into Southampton Water. The area next to Aldermoor Farm is one of the few remaining natural wet meadows in the city. In June 2006, an archaeological dig on part of the farm found no items of particular interest.		
American Wharf quay wall		18th century or earlier	SU4301011534; 50.9017°N 1.3897°W	The quay served the Chapel Mills steam mill; built of squared and coursed stone, it is an "important historic survival in the Port of Southampton" which remains close to its original state.		
Anchor Hotel	View from the modern road bridge which crosses the old road, railway and River Test adjacent to the Anchor Hotel	early 18th century	SU3704413732; 50.9219°N 1.4743°W	Situated on the banks of the River Test directly opposite the first bridge at Redbridge, this inn was used by farmers bringing their cattle into Southampton. The present structure dates partly to the early 18th century, with 19th-century additions; the older part of the property is two storeys high with a coped gable with round-headed sash window. The pub is reputed to be haunted, possibly by the spirit of "Bosie Russell", the son of the then owners of the pub, who died in the sinking of the Titanic in 1912.		
Andrews monument	Andrews monument	1860	SU4205512432; 50.9098°N 1.4032°W	Situated in Andrews Park, named after him, this is a memorial to Richard Andrews, a coach builder who was Mayor of Southampton five times. The statue was sculpted by Benjamin Brain in 1860, and stood on an ornate pedestal, but the limestone weathered poorly, and the pedestal was replaced in 1971.		
Andrews Park sundial	Andrews Park sundial	1902	SU4199612382; 50.9094°N 1.4040°W	The sundial was erected to commemorate the Coronation of Edward VII; the sides are carved with the emblems of the British Isles: rose, leek, shamrock and thistle, and the head of Edward VII.		
Asylum Green drinking fountain	Asylum Green drinking fountain	1865	SU4214712921; 50.9142°N 1.4018°W	This large stone drinking fountain was given to the town by Councillor John Ransom and bears the inscription "Drink but waste not". It stands about 15 ft. high on three stone steps. It is square in shape and surmounted by a dome and cross. Each face has a semi-circular drinking bowl and above that a panel bearing a medallion flanked by Corinthian columns. On the south side is a stone animal drinking trough.		
Asylum Green monument	Asylum Green monument	1909	SU4205513269; 50.9178°N 1.4034°W	This monument was erected to commemorate the 60th birthday of a resident of the town. Originally situated in the centre of The Avenue opposite Padwell Road, it is now located further north facing Brighton Road. It comprises three square stone pillars, the central one larger, surmounted by stone urns and linked by a stone screen. The central urn has scenes from the History of Southampton, with Canute on one side and The Mayflower on the other. The handles are in the form of prows of ships.		
Avenue St. Andrew's Church	Avenue St. Andrew's Church	1897–1898	SU4196813693; 50.9212°N 1.4043°W	Designed by Cubitt and Collinson, originally as the Avenue Congregational Church, it is built in the Perpendicular/Tudor style, of red brick with Bath stone dressings. The western end is dominated by the tower with a corbelled embattled parapet, small stone pinnacles, polygonal stair turret with an open timber canopy above and a squat tiled spire with a lead-clad finial with a wrought-iron cross.		
Bank Chambers	Bank Chambers	ca. 1835	SU4253110999; 50.8969°N 1.3966°W	Situated on Canute Road, opposite South Western House, this building occupies a triangular site adjacent to the railway crossing into the docks. It was originally a branch of the Wilts & Dorset Bank (later taken over by Lloyds Bank). It is a one-storey building with a parapet with a raised centre panel and balustrading at the sides. The two windows are flanked by Ionic columns.		
Barclays Bank, High Street		ca. 1900	SU4198011540; 50.9018°N 1.4044°W	This was formerly a branch of Martins Bank, designed by local architect, Sydney Kelway Pope, from Freemantle. It is three storeys high, built in a Neo-Jacobean style, with a parapet with elaborate strapwork motifs surmounted by four obelisk-shaped finials. Each floor has four columns in different classical styles: Corinthian order on the second floor, Ionic order on the first floor and Doric order on the ground floor. Between the first and second floor are panels bearing friezes with elaborate floral motifs. The door is at the left in an arched frame with a keystone and spandrels decorated with cornucopiae.		
2 to 6 Bassett Green		late 18th to early 19th century	SU4288916315; 50.9447°N 1.3909°W	This is a range of three cottages, built of red brick under a half-hipped tiled roof. The cottages are single storey with hipped dormer windows. No. 2 has a modern weather porch while nos. 4 and 6 have gabled porches.		
3 to 7 Bassett Green		late 18th to early 19th century	SU4289516260; 50.9442°N 1.3908°W	This is a range of three thatched cottages built of red brick. The cottages are single storey with dormer windows under the thatch. The central cottage has a gabled porch.		
Bassett Green – K6 telephone kiosk		1935	SU4292316322; 50.9447°N 1.3904°W	This is a standard K6 style telephone booth designed by Giles Gilbert Scott. It is glazed on all four sides, built of red-painted cast iron and topped with a shallow dome-style roof.		
The Bedford Hotel		ca. 1840	SU4184912695; 50.9122°N 1.4061°W	This three-storey building has a stuccoed facade with a parapet and moulded cornice concealing the roof. The second and first floors have five sash windows. On the ground floor, there is a central Tuscan style portico with round-headed windows to the right and a contemporary bar front to the left. The premises now trade as "Bedfords" and are part of the Stonegate Pub Company group.		
50 Bedford Place		ca. 1830	SU4184412856; 50.91367°N 1.4062°W	This is a narrow three storey stuccoed building with a stone coping concealing the roof. There is a single window on the second floor, while the first floor has a single French casement with a tented canopy on ornamental wrought iron supports. The shop is occupied by a branch of Atlantic Dry Cleaners.		
51 Bedford Place		ca. 1830	SU4184312862; 50.91372°N 1.4062°W	Also known as "Arvon Lodge", this three storey stuccoed property has two sash windows at each level. The roof is concealed by a parapet and there is a cast iron balcony to the first floor. The main face has end pilasters rising through all floors and cornice moulding. On the left, there is a Doric portico with a panelled door. The premises are occupied by a property company.		
56 Bedford Place		1823	SU4184812901; 50.9141°N 1.4061°W	Originally built for John Curtis, a local grocer, this was sold in 1824 to Edward Toomer, who laid out the nearby Carlton Crescent and Rockstone Place. Known as "Wilton Lodge", this is a two storey yellow brick building with a two window semi-circular bow with dentilled cornices. This has had a late-19th-century gabled rusticated attic storey added. On the right is wing with a Doric portico with four fluted columns. The building is occupied by a medical and dental practice, with a golden tooth sign on the front of the bow.		
73 Bedford Place		early to mid-19th century	SU4180712770; 50.9129°N 1.4067°W	This two storey yellow brick stands on the corner of Canton Street. It has a parapet and dentilled cornice concealing the roof. The Bedford Place elevation has a three window bow to the ground floor with iron balcony rails and French casement above. The Canton Street elevation has a central round-headed door opening with arched fanlight. The property is occupied by Ralph Neale, opticians.		
74 to 76 Bedford Place		early to mid-19th century	SU4180812761; 50.9128°N 1.4067°W	This is a terrace of three two-storey yellow brick buildings with basements and hipped roofs. Each property has a single first floor sash window and, on the ground floor, a three-light angular canted bay window with the doorcase to the right, and iron railings with steps to the basement in front. The properties are occupied by a variety of small businesses including a chiropractor, a wedding dress shop and an art gallery.		
77 Bedford Place	77 Bedford Place	early to mid-19th century	SU4180812740; 50.9126°N 1.4067°W	Also known as "Trinity House", this is a detached two storey yellow brick property with a hipped slate roof with wide eaves. On the first floor three are three modern sash windows and on the ground floor there is a central doorcase with a Doric portico. The premises are occupied by a hairdressers.		
81a Bedford Place		early to mid-19th century	SU4181212708; 50.9123°N 1.4066°W	This is a two storey property with rendered walls under a hipped slate roof (with one dormer) surrounded by a parapet with a raised band in the centre. It has three intact sash first-floor windows on the southern, Henstead Road, side with two more facing Bedford Place. On the ground floor, the sashes have been replaced; the doorway, on the southern side has an open pedimented doorcase. The premises are occupied as offices, with a beauty parlour on the ground floor.		
83 & 85 Bernard Street		early to mid-19th century	SU4233911245; 50.8991°N 1.3993°W	This is a pair of non-uniform three storey stuccoed houses with hipped roofs. No. 83 is the larger of the two with intact sash windows on each of the three floors and a round-headed doorcase to the left of the centre line of the pair. No. 85 has a sash window on the second and ground floors with a three-light canted bay on the first floor and a flat arched doorcase.		
87 to 95 Bernard Street		ca. 1840	SU4235611241; 50.8991°N 1.3991°W	Also known as "Latimer Gate", this is a terrace of five three storey stuccoed houses with basements and attics and dormer windows. Each property has a single intact sash window on each floor, with the first floor windows having pediments and brackets. There is a mouldedstringcourse between the first and ground floors. Each property has a rusticated doorcase with a cornice over. On Nos. 87–93, the doorcase is to the right, but on No. 95, this is to the left.		
113 to 121 Bernard Street		early 19th century	SU4245911222; 50.8989°N 1.3976°W	This is a terrace of five three-storey stucco houses with attics under a mansard roof, each with a dormer window. Each property has a single sash window on the second and ground floors; Nos. 113, 117 and 121 have angular bay windows on the first floor while the alternate properties have pediments over the first floor windows and cast iron balconies. Each property has an arched door with a small radiatingfanlight and moulded hood. The door for No. 121 is on the John Street frontage.		
123 to 133 Bernard Street		early 19th century	SU4250011212; 50.8988°N 1.3970°W	This is a terrace of six three-storey stuccoed houses, once known as "Peninsula Terrace". Nos. 123, 131 and 133 have dormer windows. Each property has a single sash window on the second and ground floors with a curved bow window on the first floor. The doorcases are to the left on Nos. 123, 125, 127 and 131 and to the right on the other houses. Each door has a small radiating fanlight and a moulded hood. No. 123 also has a door onto John Street with a small sash window above.		
The Globe, Bernard Street		early to mid-19th century	SU4230911279; 50.8994°N 1.3997°W	Situated at No. 76, the former Globe Public House is now converted into apartments. The building is three storeys, stuccoed under a hipped roof. The Bernard Street elevation has three sash windows on the second and first floors. The Orchard Lane elevation has three sash windows on the second floor with a cantilevered segmental bow window on the centre of the first floor. The ground floor windows are modern.		
Bevois Mansions		ca. 1840	SU4261813517; 50.9195°N 1.3951°W	This is a terrace of five three-storey stuccoed houses; each house steps down approximately one foot following the slope of the hill and has a pair of sash windows on the second and first floors, with projecting quoined window dressings. On the ground floor there is a single sash window with the doors alternating left and right with a Doric porch with dentil cornice above. No. 5, the highest property, has a later Victorian Oriel window to the first floor. The corners and joins of each house have projecting quoins.		
Bevois Street lamp standard		1882	SU4253311931; 50.9053°N 1.3965°W	This lamp standard in the centre of Jonas Nichols Square, formerly Bevois Street, was given to the town by "a local worthy to commemorate his son attaining his majority". It comprises a cast iron fluted column supported by four dolphins and is decorated with lions heads and female masks.		
Bevois Valley drinking fountain		late 19th century	SU4246013049; 50.9154°N 1.3974°W	This drinking fountain and cattle trough stands at the apex of the junction between Rockstone Lane and Bevois Valley Road, outside the former Bevois Castle pub, now known as "The Rockstone". It is made of stone and stands on two piers. It has a biblical text but no inscription.		
Bitterne Manor		13th century	SU4337213372; 50.9182°N 1.3844°W	The original manor house dates from the 13th century and was built close to the Roman port of Clausentum as the residence of the Bishop of Winchester. The building was altered several times and was severely damaged during the "Southampton Blitz" of 1940. It was restored by Herbert Collins in 1952 using the old materials. The only trace of the original 13th-century building is a blank lancet window at the left of the building.		
Bitterne Park clock tower	Bitterne Park clock tower	1889	SU4394914069; 50.9244°N 1.3761°W	The clock tower originally stood at the junction of New Road and Above Bar in the city centre and was moved to its present site in 1936. It was designed by Sydney Kelway Pope, built by Garret & Haysom and paid for by the estate of Mrs. Henrietta Bellender Sayers. It bears the inscription: "Every beast of the forest is mine and the cattle upon a 1000 hills. Psalm L.10." Over 43 ft. high, it is built of stone to resemble an Early English church steeple and is surmounted by a cross, with clock dials on all four faces. There are drinking fountains with lion’s head masks at the base.		
602 Bitterne Road East		early to mid-19th century	SU4592012981; 50.9145°N 1.3482°W	This is a thatched cottage which stands at the end of Nursery Gardens fronting onto Bitterne Road. It has cob walls which are rendered and colour-washed. The cottage is single storey with a more recent extension at the southern end forming an L-shaped property. The west wall has three windows with a half-glazed door under a modern open thatched porch.		
Bowling Green House	Bowling Green House	mid-19th century	SU4206411078; 50.8971°N 1.4018°W	This is a three-storey brick building with a green slate roof with a central cupola on eight Tuscan columns, surmounted by a steep weather-vane. It is now occupied by Wainwright Bros. (shipping agency) and the Consulate Of The Federal Republic Of Germany.		
The Dutch House, Brookvale Road		1909	SU4244114259; 50.9262°N 1.3975°W	This house, designed by local architect Richard McDonald Lucas, was one of the first two houses built on the Portswood estate and was "intended to set the standard for the design of houses that were to follow on this ‘Garden City’ estate". It is asymmetrical in design with high Dutch style gables and a Venetian window.		
1 Brunswick Place		ca. 1835	SU4196612539; 50.9107°N 1.4045°W	This is a two storey stuccoed building under a hipped roof with wide eaves. On the first floor there are three sash windows with moulded architraves. The ground floor windows have three lights with decorative cornices and console brackets separating the lights. A small flight of steps lead up to the central doorcase which is round-headed with a fanlight, under a Tuscan portico.		
16 to 20 Brunswick Place		ca. 1840	SU4208912574; 50.9111°N 1.4027°W	This is a yellow brick three-storey terrace of five properties under a hipped roof surrounded by a flat decorative cornice. Each property has a single sash window on the second floor with a semi-circular cantilevered bow window with three lights on the first floor. Between the first and ground floors is a stucco stringcourse. On the ground floor, there is a single sash window with the door on the right with a fanlight over. The buildings are occupied as offices, including accountants Chantrey Vellacott DFK in No. 20.		
1a Bugle Street	1a Bugle Street	1846	SU4184311072; 50.8975°N 1.4064°W	This Italianate style building on the Town Quay was built as the home of the Royal Southern Yacht Club. It was designed by local architect Thomas Sandon Hack and paid for by Robert Wright, a Vice-Commodore of the Club. Described at the time as "a fine palladial (sic) structure, so complimentary to the talents of its architect", it was soon abandoned by the club as it fell on hard times. The building is three storeys high with a large attic. The attic has two sash windows on the front façade. The main roof has a wide bracketed eaves cornice. There are five second floor windows on the main façade with a band of guilloche moulding. The larger first floor windows have Corinthian pilasters either side with shell ornaments in the arched tympana above. On the ground floor, there is a projecting Tuscan colonnade with five bays across the entire front of the building. The building is fronted by a semi-circular courtyard behind iron railings. It is currently home to Southampton University Air Squadron who refer to it as their "town headquarters, located on the waterfront in Southampton". It has been described in the Pevsner Architectural Guide as "the finest piece of Early Victorian architecture in the city".		
1 & 3 Bugle Street	1 and 3 Bugle Street	early 19th century	SU4184511088; 50.8978°N 1.4063°W	This is a pair of three-storey stuccoed houses with a parapet and cornice concealing the roof. Both houses have a single sash window on each floor with the two doors in the centre of the pair with pilasters and arched fanlights.		
8 Bugle Street	8 Bugle Street	early 19th century	SU4187111103; 50.8979°N 1.4060°W	This is a plain symmetrical three-storey house with cement rendering and stone coping. Each floor has two sash windows. To the left is a later addition with the main door.		
38 to 42 Bugle Street	38 to 42 Bugle Street	early 19th century	SU4188311213; 50.8989°N 1.4058°W	This is a terrace of three three-storey houses with cement rendering with the roof concealed by a parapet. Between each floor there are stringcourses. Each house has a sash window on each floor with the doorcase on the left. These have flat stone hoods and round-headed arches with fanlights.		
43 Bugle Street	43 & 45 Bugle Street	18th century	SU4186011218; 50.89890°N 1.4061°W	Although originating in the eighteenth century, this three-storey stuccoed house has been altered since. It has a parapet concealing the roof and two sash windows on the second floor. On the first floor, there is a single sash window to the left and a large angular canted bay window to the right. This has a strip pilaster frame and cornice. On the ground floor, there is a sash window to the right and a double door to the left. The main door is central under a hood on cut brackets.		
45 Bugle Street	45 Bugle Street	16th & 18th centuries	SU4186111222; 50.898951°N 1.4061°W	Also known as "Normandy House", this house was built originally in the sixteenth century but altered two hundred years later. It is three-storeyed with overhanging timber framing on the upper two storeys in which there are 18th-century rectangular bay windows and moulded wooden cornice over each floor. On the ground floor there are two sash windows and a door to the right.		
47 Bugle Street	45, 47 & 49 Bugle Street	mid-18th century	SU4186211230; 50.89902°N 1.4061°W	This is a tall (four storeys) red brick house with a parapet concealing the roof. The mid-18th-century façade conceals an older house. On the third floor, there is a single window flanked by brick panels. On the second and first floors, there are three sash windows, all with the glazing bars missing, with moulded frames and stuccoed keystones to the window heads. On the ground floor, there are two sash windows with the doorcase to the right. This has a moulded architrave surround, a bolection frieze and a cornice under a pediment. In the centre of the building, there is an opening to the cellar.		
48 Bugle Street		late 18th century	SU4188611273; 50.8994°N 1.4057°W	Described as a "fine corner building", this three-storey house stands on the corner of Bugle Street and St. Michael's Square. It is built of red brick with a tiled mansard roof. On the Bugle Street elevation, there is a single sash window and a large two-storey bay window on the first and second floors. On the ground floor, there is a pair of windows under the bay and an arched doorcase with a cast iron fanlight and a moulded surround to opening with guilloche ornament, and console brackets supporting an open moulded and carved pediment. On the St. Michael's Square elevation, there is a similar bay window with a pair of windows on the ground floor.		
51 Bugle Street	51 Bugle Street	16th & 18th centuries	SU4186111242; 50.89912°N 1.4061°W	This small three-storey building was originally built in the sixteenth century with a timber frame but was "refronted" in the eighteenth century. The front is now stuccoed with a parapet concealing the roof. On the second floor, there are three small arched recesses with a window in the central arch, the others being blank. Between the floors there are raised stringcourses. There are large three-light windows on the first and ground floors with a recessed door to the left.		
59 Bugle Street	59 Bugle Street	18th century	SU4186611274; 50.8994°N 1.4060°W	This is a small two-storey property adjoining the Tudor House museum. It has two casement windows on the first floor and two sash windows on the ground floor. The square-headed doorcase has a moulded flat hood on scroll brackets, probably not original.		

== Notes ==
- ^{A} Location is given first as a grid reference, based on the British national grid reference system (or OSGB36) of the Ordnance Survey; and second as World Geodetic System 84 coordinates, used by the Global Positioning System.
- ^{B} Unless otherwise stated, the descriptions are based on those on the Historic England database.
- ^{C} The Historic England database is the official listing and includes a description of the property, the reasons for designation, the date of listing and an extract from the Ordnance Survey map at a scale of 1:2500 pinpointing the exact location of the building.
- ^{D} The British Listed Buildings database also includes the details of the property from the Historic England database, together with links to Google/street view, Ordnance Survey and Bing maps/birds eye view.
- ^{E} Despite what Historic England say, the Customs House designed by Mr. Hawke was opposite Dock Gate 4 where Portcullis House now stands.
