= Frederick Cunliffe-Owen =

English writer and columnist

Frederick Philip Lewis Cunliffe-Owen, CBE (30 January 1855 - 30 June 1926) was an English-born writer and newspaper columnist.

== Early life ==
He was a son of exhibition organizer and museum director Sir Philip Cunliffe-Owen (1828–1894) and his German wife, Baroness Elisa Amalie Philippine Julie von Reitzenstein (1830-1894), known as "Jenny". His younger brother was industrialist Hugo Cunliffe-Owen, 1st Baronet Cunliffe-Owen.

== Biography ==
Frederick Cunliffe-Owen was educated at Lancing College and the University of Lausanne. He joined the diplomatic service and spent time in Egypt and Japan.

In 1885, Cunliffe-Owen moved to New York City with his second wife, Marguerite. He wrote for the New York Tribune, becoming first the paper's foreign editor and later its society editor. Using the pseudonym "Marquise de Fontenoy", Cunliffe-Owen wrote syndicated feature articles about European aristocratic and court society. He also wrote a series called "An Ex-Attaché's Letters" about European diplomatic and political affairs and wrote editorials on these subjects for the New York Times.

He was a military attaché in Constantinople during the July Crisis that led to World War I.

In 1916, he was sued by Rudolph de Landas Berghes for libel, after writing to the Bishop of Pennsylvania to warn him "against giving any countenance whatsoever to the soi-disant 'Prince de Berghes'."

Cunliffe-Owen was appointed a Knight of the Order of Orange-Nassau in 1908 and Commander of the Order of the British Empire and Knight Commander of the Order of the White Eagle (Serbia) in 1920.

Frederick Cunliffe-Owen died in New York on 30 June 1926. Countess Marguerite Cunliffe-Owen died on 29 August 1927.

== Personal life ==
In 1877, he married Emma Pauline de Couvreu de Deckersberg (1856-1918), with whom he had two children. They divorced in Switzerland in 1887.

He married, secondly, to Countess Marguerite de Godart de Planty et de Sourdis (1861-1927), later known as Countess Marguerite Cunliffe-Owen.
