= St Mary's Church, South Stoneham =

- Church of St. Mary
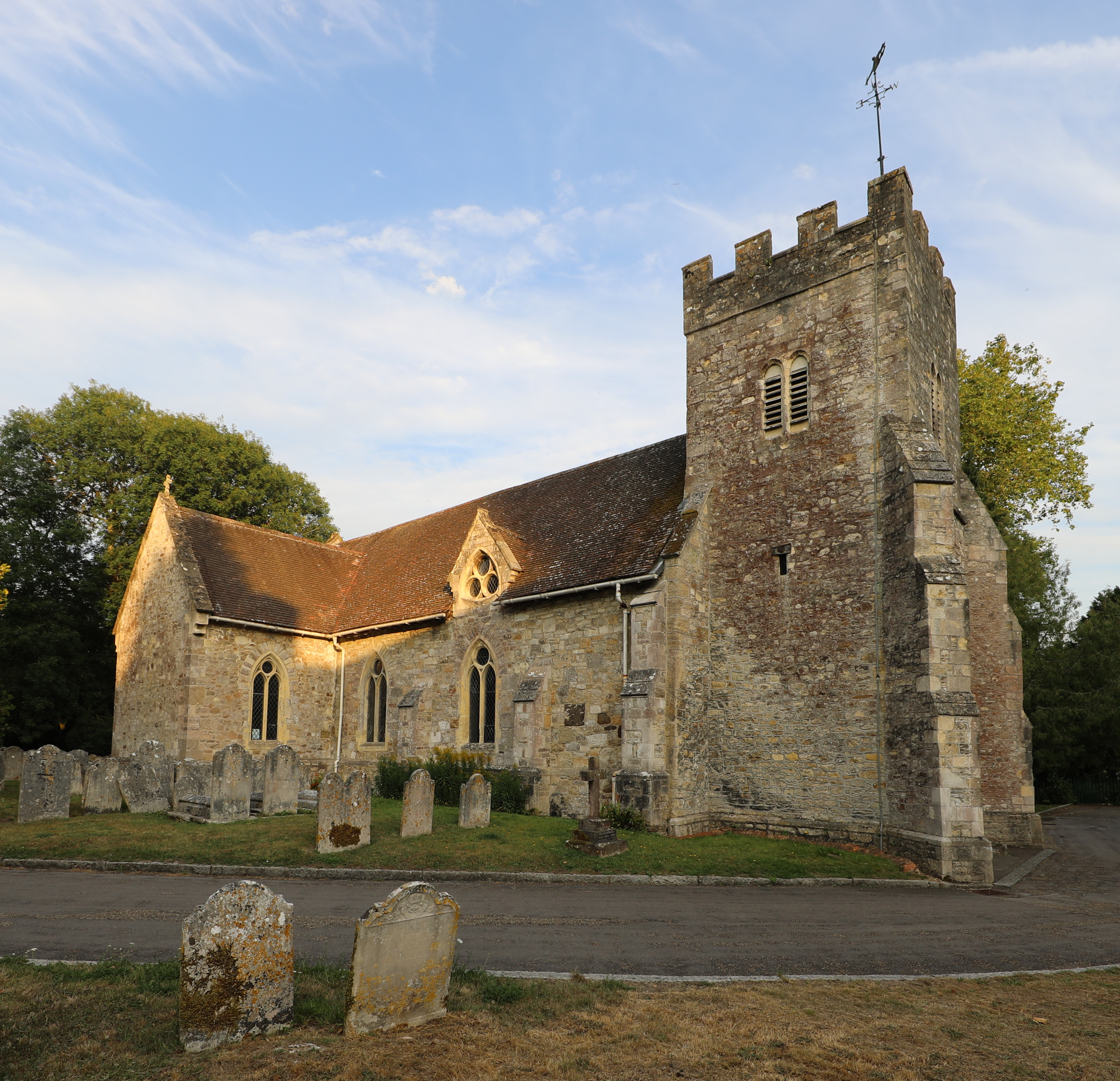
- St Mary's Church, South Stoneham

- Shown within Southampton
- 50.93656°N 1.37530°W
- OS grid reference: SU 43988 15421
- Location: Swaythling, Hampshire
- Country: England
- Denomination: Anglican
- Website: Parish of Swaythling

History
- Status: Parish church
- Founded: 12th century
- Dedication: St Mary

Architecture
- Functional status: Active
- Heritage designation: Listed building - Grade I
- Architectural type: Church
- Style: Norman

Specifications
- Materials: Stone

Administration
- Province: Canterbury
- Diocese: Winchester
- Archdeaconry: Bournemouth
- Deanery: Southampton
- Parish: Swaythling

Clergy
- Bishop: Bishop of Southampton
- Vicar: Revd Peter Dockree

Listed Building – Grade I
- Designated: 14 July 1953; Amended 8 October 1981
- Reference no.: 1179339

St. Mary's Church, South Stoneham is one of the two remaining medieval churches in the city of Southampton, England. Parts of the building date from the Norman period and the chancel arch is 12th century. The church lies in a secluded position off Wessex Lane, near the north-eastern edge of Southampton and is almost hidden in the Southampton University accommodation campus.

== History ==
=== South Stoneham parish ===
The original parish of South Stoneham covered over 8,000 acres (32.37 km^{2}; 12.50 sq mi) and extended along the eastern side of the River Itchen from the site of the present day Eastleigh in the north to just above Northam Bridge in the south, and from Swaythling to the outskirts of the original town of Southampton on the western side of the river, and included the tithings of Allington, Barton, Pollack, Shamblehurst, and Portswood. Other than the church and a few adjacent houses, there was no village of "South Stoneham", which is now part of Swaythling, a suburb of Southampton.

In the Domesday Book, the church at South Stoneham was the property of Richer the clerk, "who held this, with two dependent churches near Southampton, of the bishop of Winchester". Richer ("Richerius") was also the priest and holder of the benefice of St. Mary's Church at Southampton. The parish was listed as "Stanham – Manebrige Hundred – Hantscire".

By the 16th century, South Stoneham was described as "an appropriation of St. Mary's Church, Southampton" and both churches were in the gift and under the special jurisdiction of the Bishop of Winchester. The living at South Stoneham then became the gift of the rector of St. Mary's, Southampton, who held the right of presentation until the early 20th century.

As a result of the expansion of Southampton, the Local Government Act 1894 caused much of the parish of South Stoneham to be incorporated into newly formed neighbouring civil parishes, with the remaining parish covering approximately 1,300 acres (5.26 km^{2}; 2.03 sq mi) around the church and the village of Swaythling.

Today, the parish is part of the parish of Swaythling, which also incorporates the "Flower Roads", Hampton Park and Mansbridge estates as well as part of Townhill Park, with the principal church being St. Alban's Church in Burgess Road, built in 1933. The vicar of the parish (i.e. both churches) is the Revd Peter Dockree.

=== The church ===
There is evidence that part of the present building dates from the Norman period; the earliest remaining part is the chancel, which with the chancel arch of chalk is 12th century, with a 15th-century Perpendicular east window (Victorian glass). The nave is 13th century and the tower late-15th century.

The north transept was rebuilt in 1728 to house the early 18th century baroque monument to Edmund Dummer, attributed to Nicholas Hawksmoor, who is also believed to have designed South Stoneham House. The Dummers were Squires of Swaythling and lived at The Grange, a 16th-18th-century house now demolished. The nave monument to Sarah, wife of Hans Sloane, provides another link with South Stoneham House, where the Sloane family lived.

The south transept was built as part of the reconstruction carried out in 1854 by G. Guillaume, which also included the present gallery, replacing one built in 1715.

== The church exterior ==
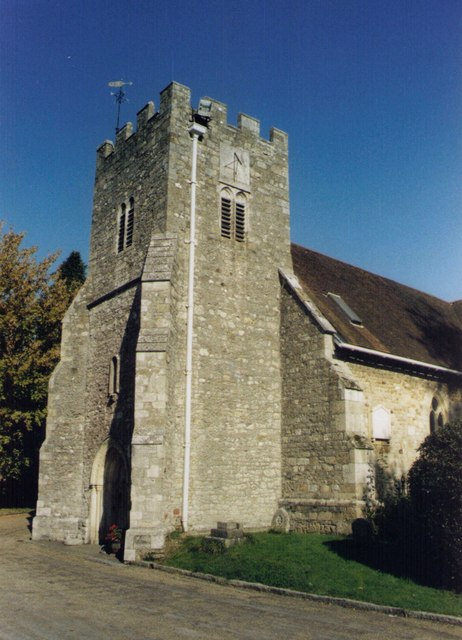
St. Mary, South Stoneham

The church is built of stone with a tiled roof, with a chancel, nave, two aisles, two small transepts and a west tower. The late-15th-century tower has small double uncusped belfry lights, later battlemented parapet and 19th century west doorway. Above the belfry window on the south face of the tower is a sundial, bearing the motto: "So Flies Life Away. 1738". The tower houses a peal of three bells which were cast in 1880 by Gillett & Bland, although some sources claim that two of the bells originate from 1603 and 1619. Over the west doorway, which is a modern imitation of twelfth-century work is a niche, probably designed for a statue of the Virgin and Child.

The churchyard contains examples of 18th century headstones with cherub, skull, heavenly crown, trumpet urn and hourglass and flower motifs and 19th century oval body stones and chest tombs. The boundary wall to the churchyard on the north side, which adjoins South Stoneham House, is a Grade II listed building. On the register of listed buildings, the wall is described:

Early C18 red brick wall, about 8 feet (2.4 m) in height laid in English Bond. Near the base is a half-diaper pattern formed of vitrified headers. Red brick plinth and coping. This wall borders on South Stoneham House and was probably built about the same time circa 1708.

=== Notable burials ===
People buried in the graveyard include:

- Henry Bromfield, Member of Parliament for Lymington (buried 19 February 1683)

== The interior ==
The church consists of the chancel and nave with small north and larger south transepts. The chancel is 24 ft (7.32 m) by 15 ft 6 in (4.72 m) with south vestry, and the nave 52 ft 4 in (15.95 m) by 20 ft 4 in (6.20 m). The chancel arch and walls, and part of the nave walls date from the 12th century.

The east window of the chancel dates from the 15th century, with three cinquefoiled lights and tracery over. In the north wall are three single lights; the middle window is higher in the wall than the others, and round-headed and dates from the 12th century; the lancets on either side are 13th century additions. There was originally a similar arrangement on the south side, but the west window of the three has been blocked by the later addition of the vestry. The small pointed doorway opening to the vestry is probably a 13th-century priest's door.

The chancel arch has two pointed orders with a roll on the western angles with detached jamb-shafts to the outer order, and keeled engaged shafts to the inner. The latter have hollow-fluted capitals and spurred bases, while the capitals of the outer order are carved with plain foliage.

The nave has two windows on the north and one on the south, and is fitted with a west gallery. The north transept has modern two-light windows on east and west, and opens to the nave by a modern arch of 12th century style, but the jambs of the arch are of old stonework, perhaps of 14th century date. The south transept opens to the nave by a tall arch with an imitation of 12th century detail, and is of modern date.

The gallery contains a small manual organ built in 1857 by J. W. Walker & Sons; and there is also a "dumb organist" made at the same time, apparently one of only two or three in existence; when placed across the keyboard, hymn tunes could be played by turning a handle.

=== Font ===
The font at the north-east of the nave, is of Purbeck marble and dates from about 1180; it has a square bowl having four round-headed arches on each face enclosing wedge-shaped objects in relief. The upper surface of the bowl has foliage in the angles, and the bowl is carried on a central and four outer shafts, the latter being modern, while the base stone is old.

=== Monuments ===
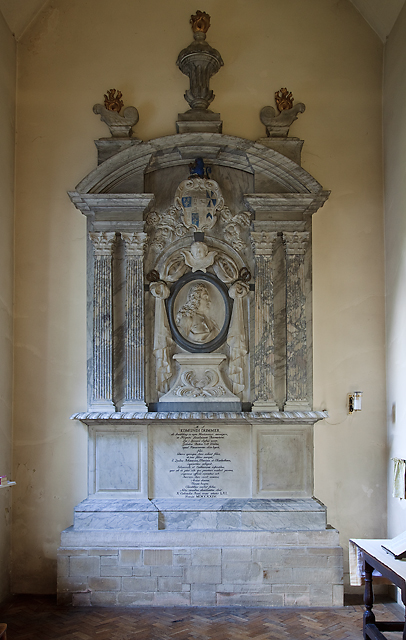
Memorial to Edmund Dummer .

Over the chancel arch are the royal arms of Charles II, dated 1660. On the south side of the chancel is the tomb of Edmund Clerke who was clerk to His Majesty's Privy Seal and died in 1632, and his wife Anne: their figures are kneeling under a canopy, with those of four sons and eight daughters on the base of the monument. Opposite this is a tomb dated from about 1540.

The north wall of the north transept is entirely occupied by the large grey and white marble monument of Edmund Dummer (1663–1724). The church was the final resting place of several members of the Dummer family; in addition to Edmund, there are monuments to his brother, Thomas (1667–1749) and Thomas' son, Thomas Lee Dummer (1712–1765). Thomas Dummer (1739–1781), the son of Thomas Lee, and his widow Harriet (died 1835) also have a joint memorial in the church.

The Dummer family crypt lay beneath the church, but was prone to flooding from the nearby River Itchen. In the 1960s the church members were concerned that whenever the river flooded "the Dummers could be heard jostling about beneath their feet". It was therefore decided to fill in the crypt.

=== Other artefacts ===
The church has some of the finest silver in Southampton, the earliest a cup of 1630; also a bible of 1572 and a shepherd's crook reputed to be more than 300 years old.

The church is also home to the University of Southampton portable campanile – this consists of 12 bells cast by Richard Bowditch and Matthew Higby in 1999.

== Restoration ==
In October 2008, the parish announced plans for a restoration project for the church at a projected cost of £150,000. Launching the project, the then Vicar of Swaythling, the Rev. Gary Philbrick, said:

It's one of the two oldest churches in the area, a little gem, one of Southampton’s best kept secrets. It has been maintained by succeeding generations and now it is our turn to do a major restoration of the building so it can be preserved for the future. The work is needed to correct mistakes made during a previous restoration effort 100 years ago, when Victorian builders repointed the medieval stonework. The use of cement-based mortar has caused the stonework to crack, causing damp, and must be replaced with a lime-based equivalent. The restoration will begin with the west tower, the roof, the boiler room and the damaged stonework. Once the ancient building has dried out, which could take up to two years, redecoration will begin, costing up to £20,000.

Amongst the work required is:

1. Replacing the cement-based mortar in the tower with lime-based mortar, both to stop damp getting in and to preserve the exterior stonework surface of the walls.
2. Replacing lead flashings on the roofs to prevent the ingress of moisture, particularly in the Transepts. Replacement tiles are needed, as are repairs to down-pipes and gutters.
3. To repair the stonework, especially around the Norman West Door and some of the windows, which has deteriorated badly.
4. To demolish the ugly mid-20th century boiler house and re-site the boiler in the Clergy Vestry.
5. Re-decoration of the interior of the Church.

The restoration work was undertaken by Fareham-based HGP Architects with Michael Underwood, a Conservation Architect as the Inspecting Architect; Underwood was also a member of the Diocese of Winchester Diocesan Advisory Committee.

== See also ==
- Listed buildings in Southampton
