= Helen Elizabeth Oliver =

American singer

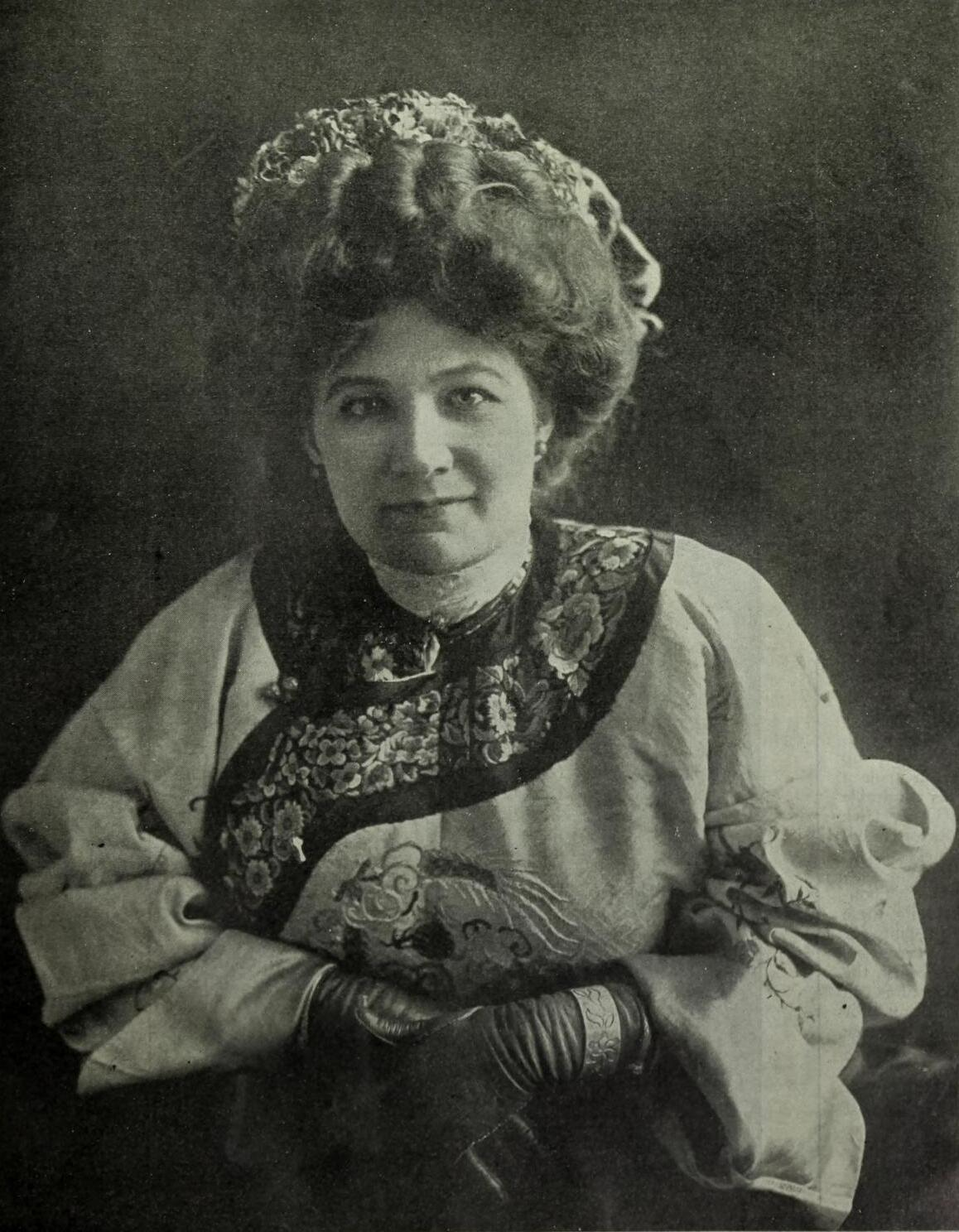
Mazie Oliver, 1908

Helen Elizabeth "Mazie" Oliver (c. 1896 - January 14, 1934) was a singer. She was born in about 1896 in Washington, Pennsylvania, to James H. and Mary E. Oliver.. She married Marvelle Cooper "Monte" Brice, a song-writer, in 1914, and divorced him in 1918, marrying Hugo Cunliffe-Owen six weeks later, at Conant Memorial Church in Dudley, Massachusetts. Cunliffe-Owen settled $4,000,000 on her when they wed. She appeared in the movie Marriage for Convenience.

She died on January 14, 1934, after an operation. She had two sons and two daughters with Cunliffe-Owen.
