= Edmund Dummer (lawyer) =

English lawyer

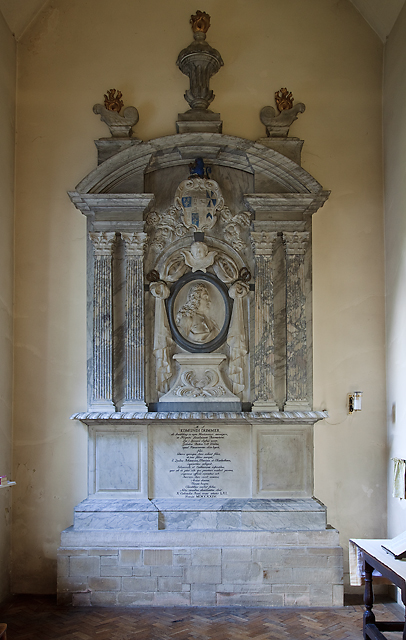
Dummer memorial in St. Mary's Church, South Stoneham.

Edmund Dummer (1663–1724) was an English lawyer who was appointed "Clerk of the Great Wardrobe" under Queen Anne in 1706, holding that office until 1721.

His nephew, Thomas Lee Dummer, succeeded him as "Clerk of the Great Wardrobe" and served as MP for Southampton (1737–1741) and (Newport (Isle of Wight) (1765–1768).

There is a memorial to Dummer in South Stoneham church. He is thought to have commissioned South Stoneham House, the grounds of which were designed by Capability Brown.
