= Cunliffe-Owen Concordia =

British aircraft of the 1940s

Concordia
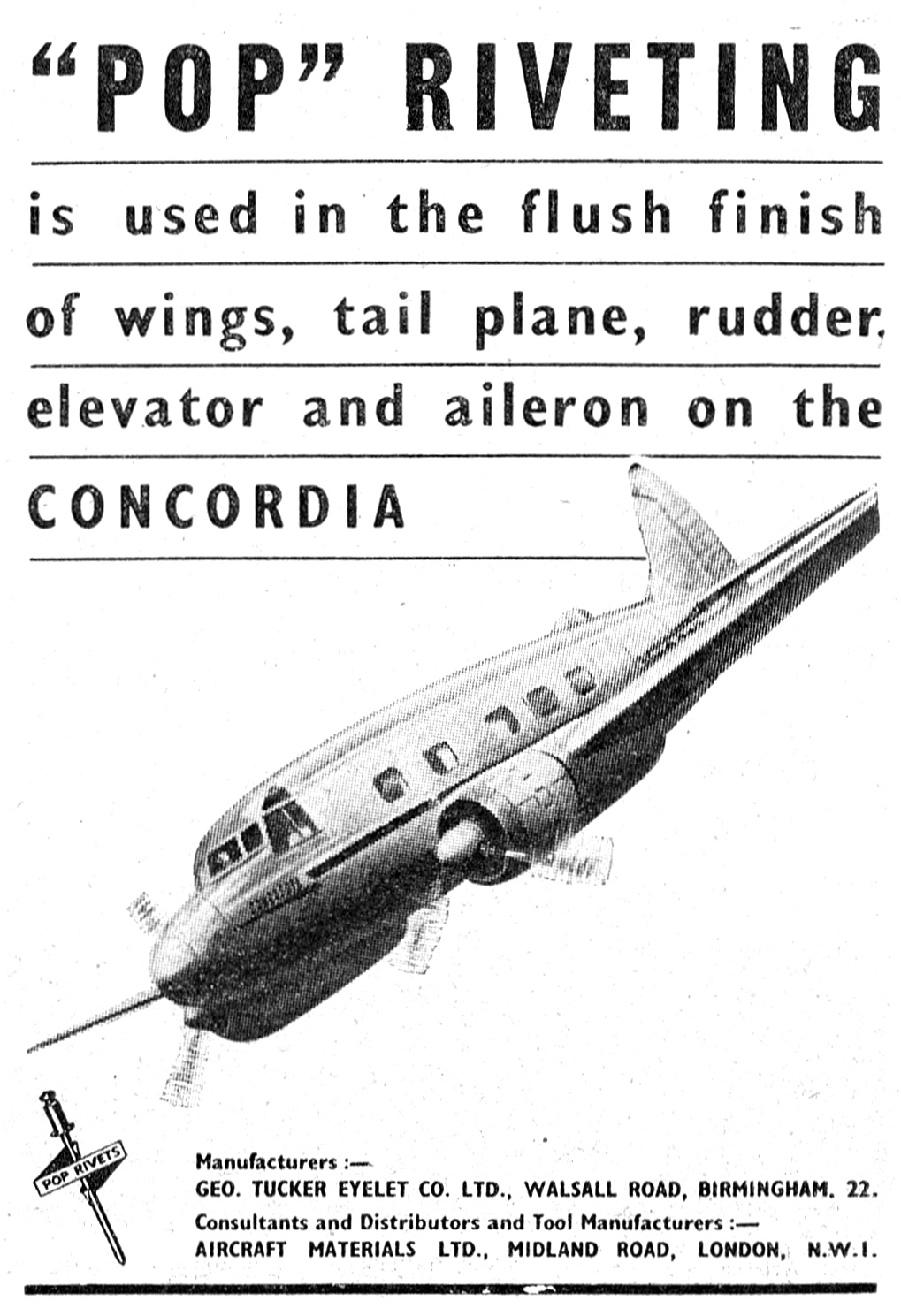
- 1947 magazine advertisement featuring the Concordia

General information
- Type: Airliner
- National origin: United Kingdom
- Manufacturer: Cunliffe-Owen
- Number built: 2

History
- First flight: 19 May 1947
- Retired: 1947

The Cunliffe-Owen Concordia was a 1940s British twin-engined small airliner built by Cunliffe-Owen Aircraft.

== History ==
The Concordia was 12-seat medium range transport aircraft. A separate luggage compartment could accommodate 45 lbs of luggage per passenger. Designed by W. Garrow-Fisher and built at Eastleigh, Hampshire in 1947. The prototype aircraft Y-0222 was first flown at Eastleigh on 19 May 1947. A second aircraft G-AKBE was displayed at the 1947 SBAC Show at Radlett and made an extensive European sales tour.

Work was suspended on 18 November 1947 on a production batch of six aircraft. These included one aircraft for the Nawab of Bhopal and two for British European Airways. Air Malta placed an order for one example in early 1947. It was concluded there was not a market for the aircraft. Shortly afterward the company ceased to work in the aircraft industry.

The Belgian COGEA company styled themselves exclusive agents for the Concordia for Belgium and its then colony Congo; no results are documented.

== Specifications ==
Data from Jane's all the World's Aircraft 1947, Flight 11 September 1947

General characteristics

- Crew: 3
- Capacity: 10/12 pax
- Length: 44 ft 2 in (13.45 m)
- Wingspan: 57 ft 0 in (17.38 m)
- Height: 16 ft 10 in (5.12 m)
- Wing area: 436 sq ft (40.5 m^{2})
- Aspect ratio: 7.46
- Empty weight: 15,501 lb (7,031 kg)
- Gross weight: 10,999 lb (4,989 kg)
- Fuel capacity: 200 imp gal (240 US gal; 910 L)
- Powerplant: 2 × Alvis Leonides L.E.4M 9-cylinder air-cooled radial piston engines, 550 hp (410 kW) each
- Propellers: 3-bladed de Havilland or Rotol, 9 ft 0 in (2.74 m) diameter constant-speed fully feathering reversible propellers

Performance

- Maximum speed: 223 mph (359 km/h, 194 kn) at 3,255 ft (992 m)
- Cruise speed: 190 mph (310 km/h, 170 kn) 80% power at 7,000 ft (2,100 m)
- Stall speed: 70 mph (110 km/h, 61 kn) flaps down
- Range: 1,200 mi (1,900 km, 1,000 nmi)
- Service ceiling: 21,000 ft (6,400 m)
- Rate of climb: 1,420.5 ft/min (7.216 m/s)
- Wing loading: 25.29 lb/sq ft (123.47 kg/m^{2})
- Power/mass: 11 lb/hp (6.69 kg/kW)
- Take-off: 316 yd (289 m)
