= Eric Meadus =

English painter

Eric Meadus (1931–1970) was an English artist whose work was exhibited in the Royal Academy and Paris Salon.

Meadus came from the 'Flower Roads' of Swaythling, a council estate. He was born in Rigby Road, Southampton, but his family soon moved to Lobelia Road. He first exhibited in a mixed show at the City Art Gallery. L.S. Lowry met him in 1965 and encouraged him. He attended King Edward VI School, Southampton, and later worked for Pirelli General where he provided cartoons for their house magazine Cable.

His oils were exhibited at the Royal Academy, the Cork Street gallery in London and at the Paris Salon. Another Southampton artist, Margery Clarke, continued to display his work at The First Gallery, which she ran in Bitterne, Southampton.

== Exhibitions ==
- 1971: Royal Academy Summer Exhibition.
- 1996: Southampton City Art Gallery — Meadus line drawings from the permanent collection.
- 1996: The First Gallery, Southampton.
- 1999: Tudor House Museum, Southampton.
- 2001: The First Gallery, Southampton.
- 2006: The First Gallery, Southampton.
- 2011: The First Gallery, Southampton.
- 2014: The First Gallery, Southampton.
