= Swaythling =

Area of Southampton, England

Coordinates: 50.94°N 1.38°W

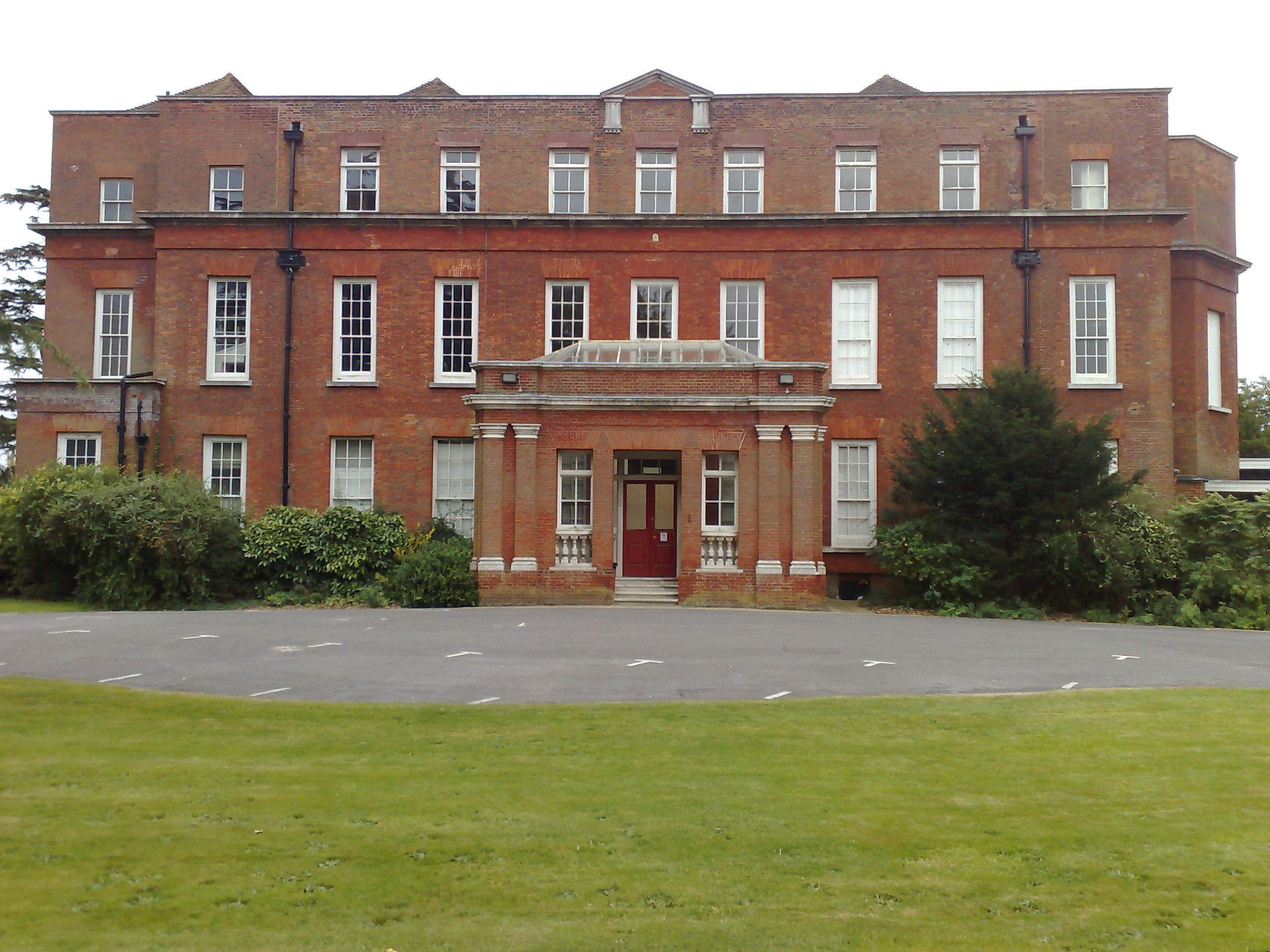
- South Stoneham House, Swaythling.

- Location within Southampton
- Area: 2.99 km^{2} (1.15 sq mi)
- Population: 13,664
  - Density: 4,570/km^{2} (11,800/sq mi)
- Unitary authority: Southampton
- Ceremonial county: Hampshire
- Region: South East
- Country: England
- Sovereign state: United Kingdom
- Post town: SOUTHAMPTON
- Postcode district: SO16
- Dialling code: 023
- Police: Hampshire and Isle of Wight
- Fire: Hampshire and Isle of Wight
- Ambulance: South Central
- UK Parliament: Romsey and Southampton North

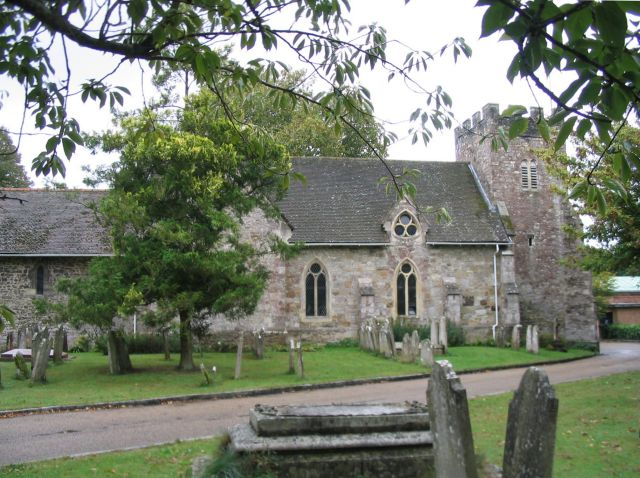
St Mary's Church, South Stoneham

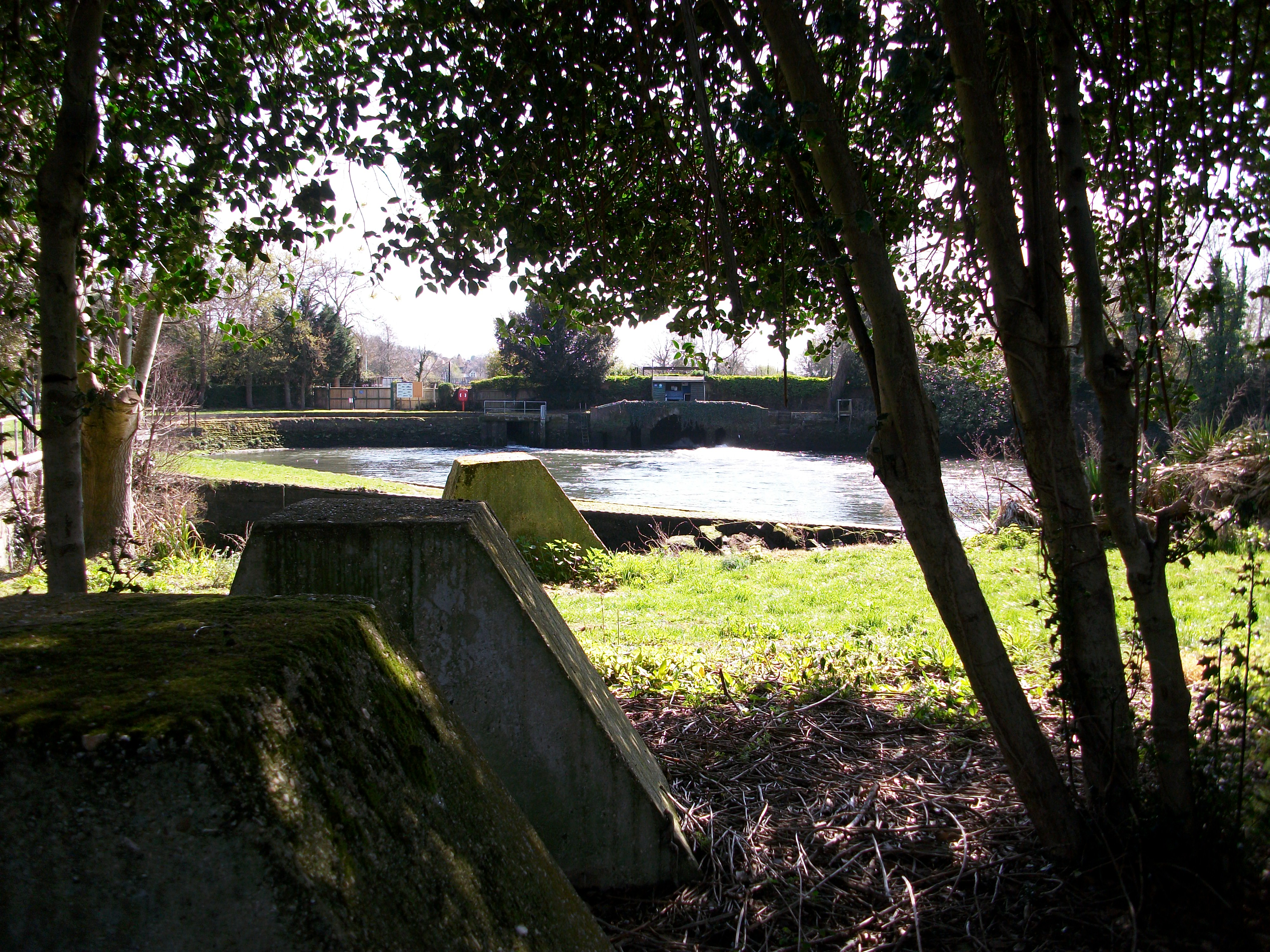
Salmon Pool, Swaythling (showing WWII-era dragon's teeth anti-tank defences in the left foreground)

Swaythling is a suburb and electoral ward of the city of Southampton in Hampshire, England. The ward has a population of 13,664.

Swaythling is predominantly residential in character, and noted for its large student population due to its proximity to the University of Southampton main campus at Highfield. The university's Wessex Lane Halls and City Gateway housing facilities are located within the district.

Swaythling during World War I was the location of the Swaythling Remount Depot and prior to its closure in 2013, the Ford Motor Company Southampton Assembly Plant.

== History ==
=== Manor and estate of South Stoneham ===
Recorded as Swæthelinge in 909 AD, the origins of the name Swaythling (or prior to 1895, more commonly referred to as Swathling village) are uncertain. It is widely thought that the name originally referred to the stream that runs through the area, now known as Monks Brook; the Old English word swætheling is believed to mean "misty stream".

Swaythling originally formed part of the parish of South Stoneham, which encompassed Eastleigh and almost all of the land between Swaythling and the Bargate, in Southampton City Centre. The parish church was St. Mary's; the present building is one of Southampton's two medieval churches. It is accessible from Wessex Lane, down a short track between Connaught Hall and South Stoneham House (both now halls of residence serving the University of Southampton).

South Stoneham House was built in 1708 for the Surveyor of the Navy, Edmund Dummer, and is attributed to Nicholas Hawksmoor. The grounds were laid out after 1772 by Capability Brown.

Woodmill is an ancient watermill site located in Swaythling at the highest tidal point of the River Itchen, where it is joined by the Itchen Navigation. The industrialist Walter Taylor moved there after 1770, but his mill burned down in 1820 to be replaced by the present structure which is now used as a water sports and outdoor activity centre.

Following his exile to Britain in 1852, the deposed Argentine dictator, Juan Manuel de Rosas, rented Burgess Street Farm in Swaythling, where he spent the rest of his days until his death in 1877. The local people at that time are said to have developed a taste for the Argentine beverage, maté, as a result.

=== 20th century to present ===
During the First World War Swaythling was the location of the British Army's largest remount depot; a facility for the collection, training and care of horses and mules prior to dispatch to the Western Front. Originally designed in 1914 to accommodate three squadrons (1,500 horses), the depot, located on both sides of Bassett Green Road, was subsequently expanded to provide stabling for ten squadrons (5,000 horses).

In 1924 the Hampton Park Hotel pub opened in the area. It was later renamed to The Tanners. With the construction of the "Flower Roads" council estate, St. Alban's church was erected in 1933. St Alban's remained a separate parish until 1992, when the parish of Swaythling came into being, incorporating the former parishes of St. Alban's, Southampton and South Stoneham, with both St. Alban's and St. Mary's church buildings being used for worship.

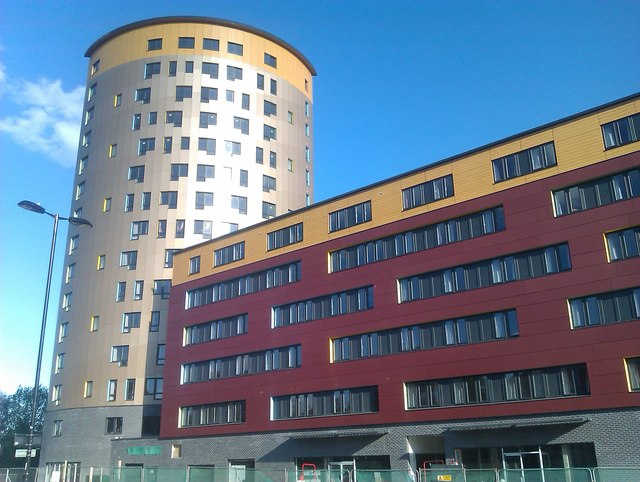
City Gateway, Swaythling

In 1931 Connaught Hall was built, to accompany South Stoneham House as a hall of residence for the university. The university acquired South Stoneham House in 1921 and subsequently in 1964 added a 17-storey residential tower block that dominated the Wessex Lane area until its demolition in 2022.

Much of the Swaythling landscape and its architecture was captured in the 1950s and 1960s by local artist Eric Meadus.

In 1990 Whitbread brewery closed The Tanners pub. It was then purchased by Devonshire Breweries who re-opened it in 1991 under the name The Old Black Cat until 1996 when it closed before being sold to McDonald's.

The University of Southampton's City Gateway hall of residence, opened in 2015, was included in the runners-up list of the Carbuncle Cup, a competition by Building Design magazine to identify the ugliest building in the United Kingdom completed in the previous 12 months. Designed by Fluid Design and Stride Treglown, the building provides accommodation for 375 students and features a 15-story elliptical tower and two adjoining six story rectangular accommodation blocks at the fork of two major roads.

== Geography ==
Swaythling is a northern suburb of the city of Southampton and borders (clockwise from South) Portswood, Highfield, Bassett Green, Eastleigh, Mansbridge and Townhill Park. Predominantly low-lying in terms of elevation, the ward boundary to the east is defined by Monks Brook and the Itchen River. The northern section of the Swaythling district is bisected in part by the M27 motorway.

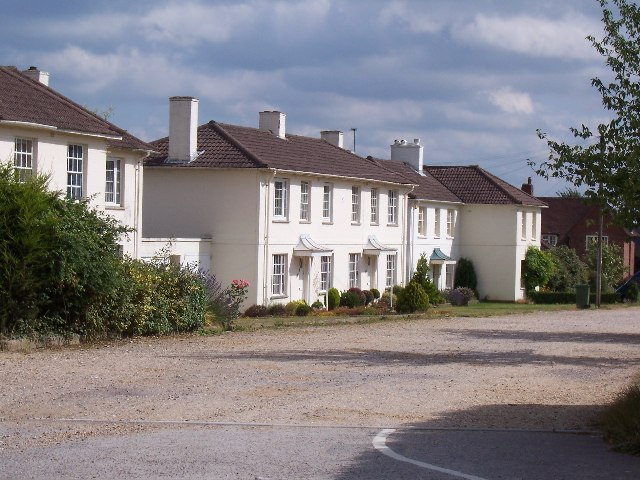
Herbert Collins houses in Ethelburt Avenue

The stream that gave the area its name is largely hidden from view as it runs through Swaythling, although it can still be seen next to the Fleming Arms pub.

The historical village of Swaythling is now extensively suburban in character with much of the area used for residential housing. High Road, which was the village's High Street, has waned in popularity recently with several established businesses, such as Dunning's grocery store, having shut down. High Road today is dominated by take-away food outlets and a couple of newsagents. The Old Black Cat (The Hampton Park Hotel) pub was turned into a McDonald's restaurant in the late 1990s.

== Demography ==
The ward has a population of 13,394, consisting of 6,835 males and 6,559 females. 63.4 per cent of the population of Swaythling are Christian, 22.7 per cent have no religion, 2.6 per cent are Muslim and 1.3 per cent Buddhist. 70.5 per cent of Swaythling's population are in good health, a figure which is above the averages for Southampton and England. A further 21.9 per cent are in fairly good health, while 7.56 per cent are classified as "not good".

There are 4,727 households in Swaythling, of which 17.9 per cent are owner occupied and owned outright, 25.1 per cent are owner occupied with a mortgage or similar loan, 1.6 per cent are shared ownership, 18.4 per cent are rented from the council, 13.8 per cent are rented from a housing association, 20.1 are rented from a private landlord or letting agency, and 3.1 per cent rented from elsewhere.

== Economy ==
=== Ford ===
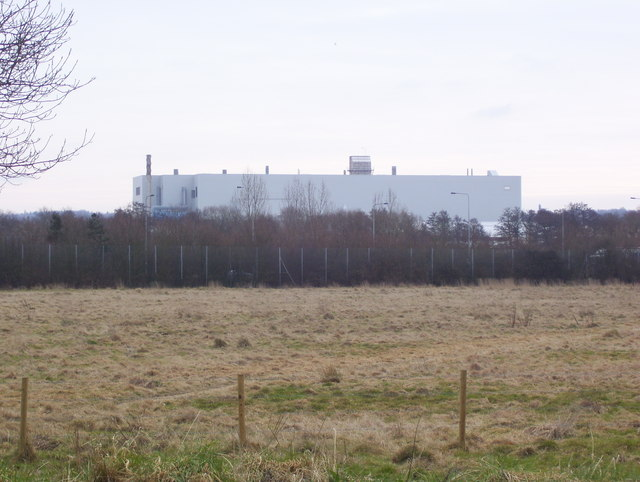
Ford Southampton plant

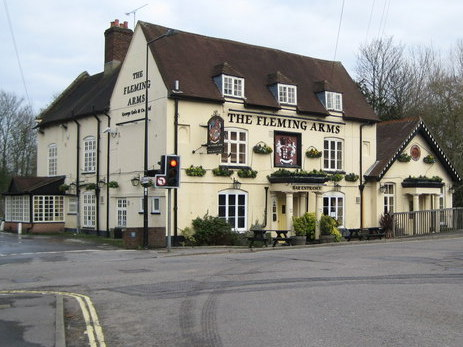
The Fleming arms public house

The Ford Southampton plant was a motor vehicle assembly plant, located in Mansbridge. It was the western European home to the production of the Ford Transit van. The plant, purposefully located on a 44-acre (180,000 m^{2}) site near to Southampton Airport, was built as a shadow factory to assemble aircraft components for engineering firm Cunliffe-Owen Aircraft, opened by the Mayor of Southampton on 2 February 1939. At the outbreak of World War II, its whole supply chain was switched to produce parts for the Supermarine Spitfire. Recognised as an important part of the British war effort, it was bombed on a number of occasions by the Nazi Luftwaffe, the first in September 1940. In the latter years of the war, the site was used to assemble the Spitfire.

After Cunliffe-Owen was placed in receivership in 1947, the factory was bought in 1949 by Briggs Motor Bodies, who supplied Ford of Britain with bodies for their vehicles. In 1953 Ford acquired Briggs, and hence gained control of the 630,000 square feet (59,000 m^{2}) Southampton plant. From 1965, Ford had started to produce the Ford Transit in Great Britain, with bodies from Swaythling shipped up the M3 motorway to be mated with chassis at the Langley, Berkshire factory, near Slough. In 1972, Ford of Britain invested £5M in the Southampton plant, enabling it to make the complete Transit van. The first Transit rolled off of the production line in the same year, given to the mayor to be used as a gift for a local charity. From this point until the mid-1980s was the height of production, with the factory employing 4,500 workers.

In 1983 with construction of the M27 motorway starting, the site was permanently cut off from Southampton Airport. In 2002, Ford stopped producing passenger cars in the UK, leaving the Southampton made Transit as their only British-made vehicle. In 2009, with the new Kocaeli, Turkey, plant in full production, Ford reluctantly halved production at Southampton and reduced the workforce to just over 500.

Employing 500 workers, the factory produced up to 35,000 Transit chassis/cab variant vehicles annually, of which 50% were exported.

The Ford Southampton plant closed on 26 July 2013.

=== B&Q ===
The very first branch of the DIY chain B&Q was opened in Swaythling in 1969. The shop was owned by Messrs Block and Quayle.

== Transport ==
Swaythling railway station is on the main line between London and Bournemouth, and was opened in 1883. Originally Swathling Station, the "Y" was added in 1895 at the request of the squire, Sir Samuel Montagu, who became the first Baron Swaythling in 1907.

On 24 August 1988 Swaythling was the scene of a Guinness Book of Records attempt for the largest street party when the A335 (Thomas Lewis Way, named after Tommy Lewis) was first opened. This route allows traffic to bypass Swaythling and the neighbouring suburb of Portswood when travelling from the M27 to Southampton's city centre. Around 3000 people were present at the event, which failed to beat the record of 5,500 people held by Oxford Street in London.

== Sport ==
Swaythling Athletic Football Club was established in 1946 in the Fleming Arms public house and played its early games on the field at Walnut Avenue. In 1957, the club moved to Ten Acres in North Stoneham and in 1980 became known as Eastleigh F.C..

The Ford Southampton plant had a long running works football club called Ford Sports, which ran numerous teams from 1949 to 2001.

The Swaythling Cup, an international table tennis competition, was set up in 1926 by Baroness Swaythling's two sons, Ivor and Ewen Montagu.

== Notable residents ==
Juan Manuel Rosas, Argentine dictator, lived in exile in Swaythling where he had a farm, dying in 1877.

Professor Martin Glennie, developer of the promising cancer immunotherapeutic drug CHiLOB7/4 currently undergoing clinical trials, lives in Swaythling.

== See also ==
- Swaythling and Bassett Covenant of Churches
