= Ford Southampton plant =

Ford motor vehicle assembly in Southampton, England

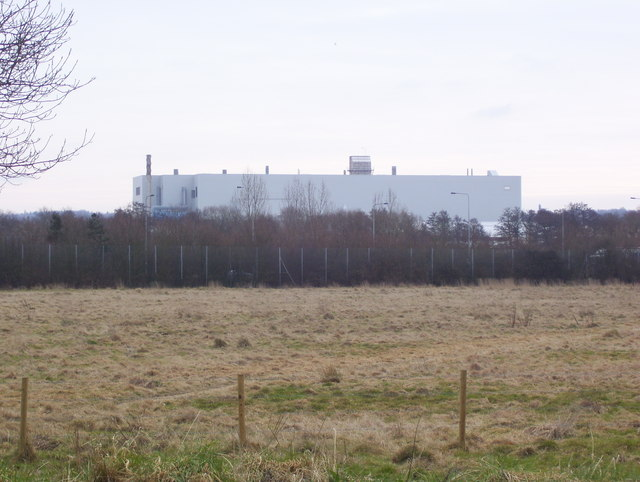
- Built: 1939
- Location: Swaythling, Southampton, England
- Coordinates: 50°56′37″N 1°22′6″W
- Industry: Automotive
- Products: Vans
- Employees: 500
- Area: 44-acre (180,000 m^{2})
- Volume: 630,000 square feet (59,000 m^{2})
- Defunct: 2013

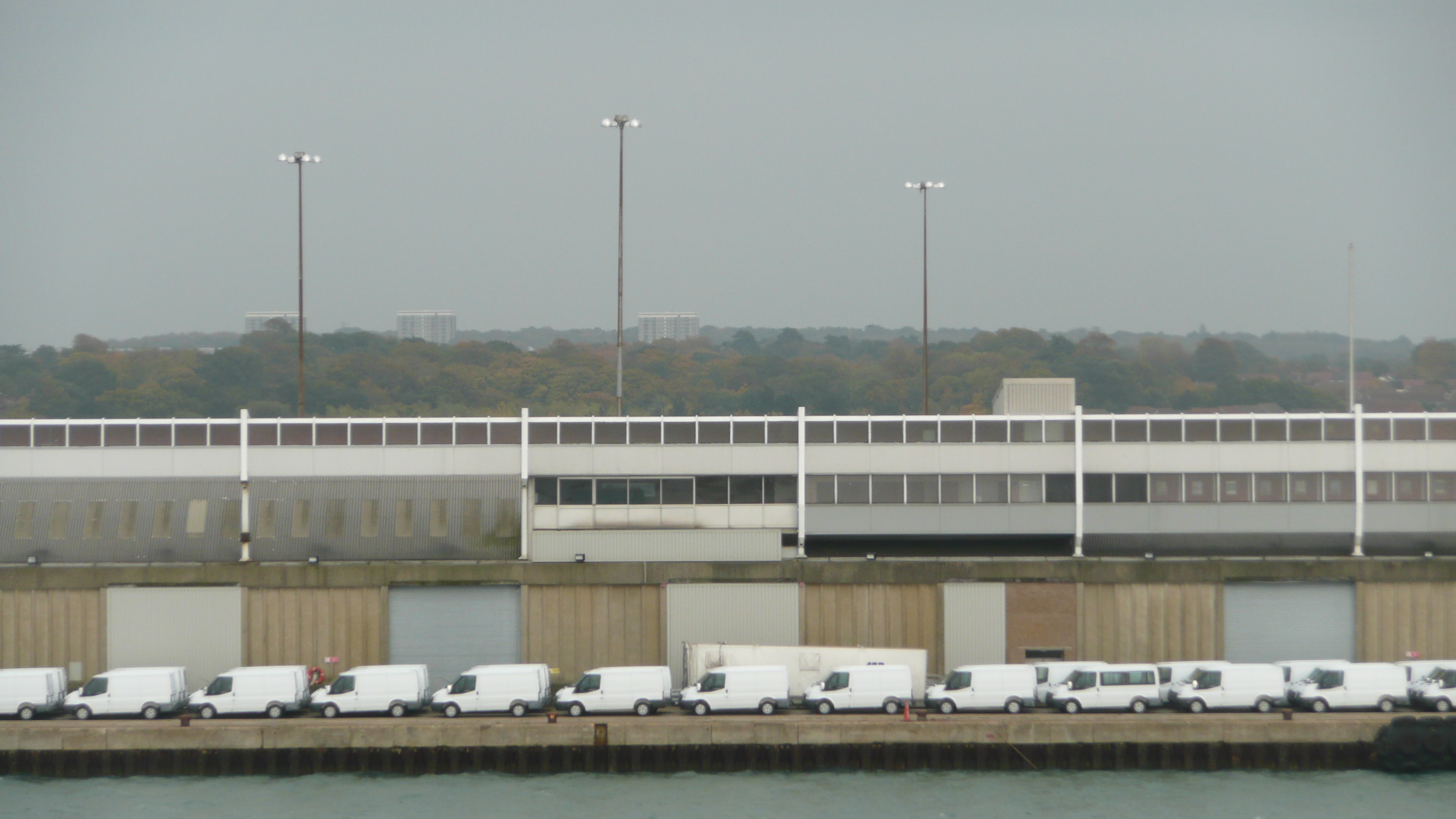
Ford Transit vans awaiting export from Southampton Docks

The Ford Southampton plant was a motor vehicle assembly plant, located in Swaythling on the north eastern outskirts of Southampton, England. It was the western European centre for production of the Ford Transit van. The last vehicle was produced on 26 July 2013, ending Ford's vehicle assembly operations in the UK.

== History ==
The plant, on a 44-acre (180,000 m^{2}) site near Southampton Airport, was built as a shadow factory to assemble aircraft components for engineering firm Cunliffe-Owen Aircraft, and was opened by the Mayor of Southampton on 2 February 1939. At the outbreak of World War II, the factory and its supply chain were switched to produce parts for the Supermarine Spitfire. Recognised as an important part of the British war effort, it was bombed on a number of occasions by the German Luftwaffe, the first in September 1940. In the later years of the war, the site was used to assemble the Spitfire.

After Cunliffe-Owen was placed in receivership in 1947, the factory was bought in 1949 by Briggs Motor Bodies, who supplied Ford of Britain with bodies for their vehicles. In 1953 Ford acquired Briggs, and hence gained control of the 630,000 square feet (59,000 m^{2}) Southampton plant. The factory now specialised in building truck bodies, which were attached to the chassis that had been produced at Slough.

From 1965, Ford had started to produce the Ford Transit in Great Britain, with bodies sent by road from Swaythling to be mated with chassis at the Langley, Berkshire factory, near Slough. In 1972, Ford of Britain invested £5M in the Southampton plant, enabling it to make the complete Transit van. The first Transit rolled off the production line in the same year, and was given to the mayor to be used as a gift for a local charity. From this time until the mid-1980s was the height of production, with the factory employing 4,500 workers.

In 1983, with construction of the M27 motorway starting, the site was permanently cut off from Southampton Airport. This made a compact site even more so, with the motorway to the north; a railway to the west; a graveyard to the east; and pinned in by the airport. This led to unusual layouts for parts of the factory, with the paint shop arranged on the vertical axis over six stories, as opposed to the traditional horizontal layout.

In 2002, Ford stopped producing passenger cars in the UK, leaving the Southampton-made Transit as their only British-made vehicle. In 2009, with the new Ford Otosan plant in Kocaeli Province, Turkey, in full production, Ford halved production at Southampton and reduced the workforce to just over 500. The six-millionth Ford Transit was built in 2009.

Engines were sourced from either the Dagenham or Bridgend plants. This allowed the factory to produce up to 75,000 vehicles annually, of which 50% were exported.

== Closure ==
In September 2011, Ford of Europe confirmed that Southampton would continue to make the short and medium wheelbase, and Tourneo minibus versions, of the Transit for two more years. Production of these was then to be consolidated to Turkey with the new model in 2014, while Southampton was to continue as the European centre for the chassis-cab variant of the new Transit, with production ramped up to 35,000 units a year.

On 26 October 2012, Ford announced that, as part of a larger cutback of their European production capacity, the Southampton factory would close altogether in July 2013, with production for Europe of all the new Transit models shifted to Turkey. The Dagenham Stamping Plant was also to be shut down; this plant had provided most of the sheet metal panels for the Southampton Assembly Plant. The last Transit went into production on 15 July 2013 and was completed on 26 July.

Workers who had not accepted either redundancy or early retirement were redeployed to:

- A new £12 million distribution centre at Southampton Docks
- A new vehicle refurbishment plant at the existing site, employing 134 staff
- Ford's other UK factories manufacturing engines, at Bridgend (petrol) or Dagenham (diesel).

Demolition of the Southampton plant began in 2015 and by September 2017, the factories on the site had been completely demolished.
