= Marguerite Cunliffe-Owen =

French-born author (1859–1927)

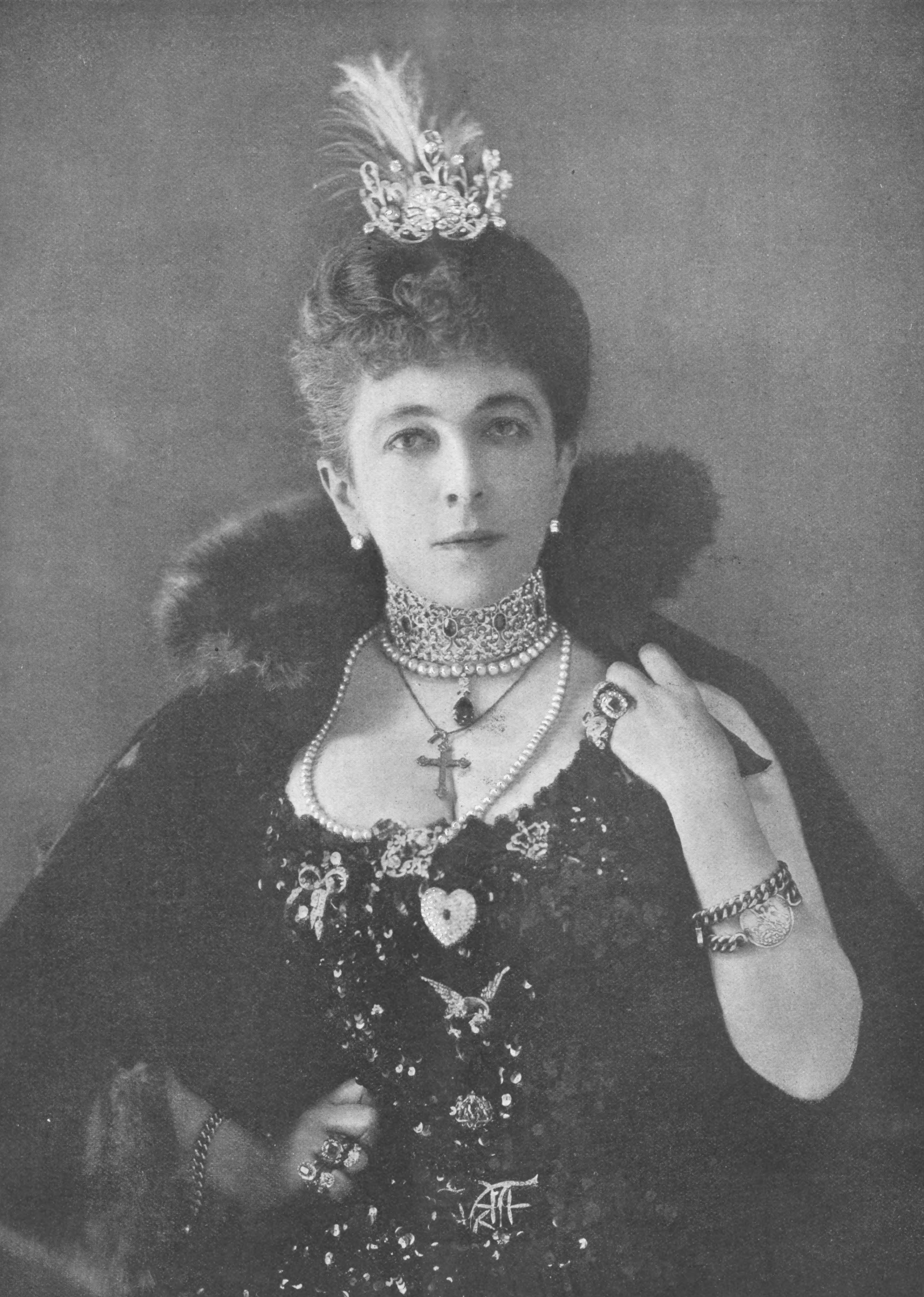
Marguerite Cunliffe-Owen

Marguerite Cunliffe-Owen, Countess du Planty et de Sourdis (1859 – 1927) was a French-born historical novelist, nonfiction author, and a syndicated newspaper columnist who published under such pseudonyms as La Marquise de Fontenoy and Officier de l'Ordre de l'Instruction Publique de France.

== Biography ==
Marguerite de Godart, Countess du Planty et de Sourdis was born in Morbihan, Brittany, in 1859. The daughter of Jules and Isaure de Godart, Count and Countess du Planty et de Sourdis, she first married a Swiss nobleman, Baron Gustave de Goumoëns, and secondly, Frederick Cunliffe-Owen.

In 1885, the couple came on a secret diplomatic mission to the United States. Shortly after arriving in the country, their European fortune was lost. Frederick eventually became foreign editor and later society editor of the New York Tribune in 1889.

Marguerite Cunliffe-Owen published a series of biographies and novels. Several of her books dealing with the royal courts of Europe were published anonymously or under the nom de plume, La Marquise de Fontenoy, which was the name she used for a newspaper column that chronicled upper class society in a frank manner.

She died on 29 August 1927, a year after her husband's death, and left her estate to Dr. Edward F. Sutton, "for many years a member of the Cunliffe-Owen household".

== Awards and honors ==
She was made an honorary member of the police honor legion of the New York City Police Department in recognition of her volunteer work on behalf of wounded policemen.

== Works ==
- The Martyrdom of an Empress (1899)
- The Tribulations of a Princess (1901)
- A Doffed Coronet (1902)
- A Keystone of Empire (1903)
- Imperator Et Rex: William II of Germany (1904)
- The Trident and the Net (1905)
- Gray Mist (1906)
- Emerald and Ermine (1907)
- The Cradle of the Rose (1908)
- Snow-Fire: A Story of the Russian Court (1910)
- Moonglade (1915)
