= St Alban's Church, Southampton =

St. Alban's Church
- Church of St Alban the Martyr
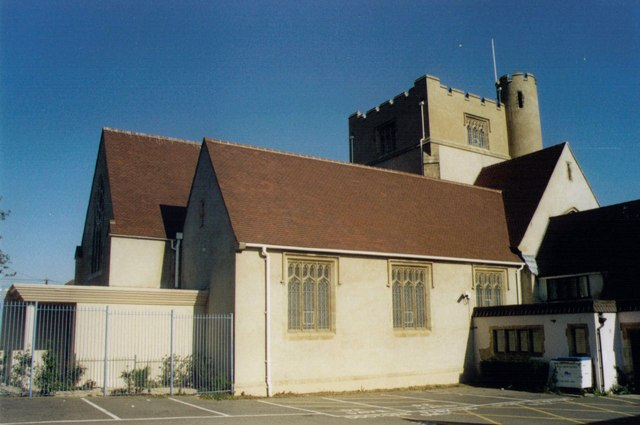
- St Alban's Church, Southampton

- Shown within Southampton
- 50.9390°N 1.3874°W
- OS grid reference: SU 43140 15688
- Location: Swaythling, Hampshire
- Country: England
- Denomination: Anglican
- Website: Parish of Swaythling

History
- Status: Parish church
- Founded: 20th century
- Dedication: St. Alban
- Consecrated: 17 June 1933

Architecture
- Functional status: Active
- Heritage designation: Listed building - Grade II
- Architect: Nugent Francis Cachemaille-Day
- Architectural type: Church
- Style: Gothic

Specifications
- Materials: Lime mortar rendered brick

Administration
- Province: Canterbury
- Diocese: Winchester
- Archdeaconry: Bournemouth
- Deanery: Southampton
- Parish: Swaythling

Clergy
- Bishop: Bishop of Southampton
- Vicar: The Revd Peter Dockree

St. Alban's Church, Swaythling, Southampton, stands on Tulip Road, just off the main Burgess Road. The church, and its associated hall, is a Grade II listed building.

== Creation of the parish ==
The Parish of St. Alban was formed at the beginning of 1932, mainly out of the South Stoneham Parish, but at that time there was no St. Alban's church, only a site on which to build it. The land had been part of Swaythling Farm and had been acquired through the foresight of the then Archdeacon of Winchester (Ven. A. E. Daldy). Until the new church was ready worship in the new parish took place in St. Agnes Church, from 1905 to 1933, on Portswood Road and in the Burgess Road Mission which until then had been in Highfield Parish (latterly known as St. Alban's Mission).

St. Alban's Church was completed in 1933.

The site was large enough for not only for the church but for the vicarage and large halls; the importance of the grouping of the buildings means that they are collectively listed as Grade II on the English Heritage list of protected buildings.

== Architecture ==
St. Alban's Church was one of the first to be designed by the noted architect Nugent Francis Cachemaille-Day and built by the Southampton builders GE Prince & Sons.

A "big cruciform church with (a) low, broad central tower," it is on the Latin Cross plan and is late Gothic in style. The traditional outward appearance of the church contains a "spacious and well shaped interior", with a centralised altar that Pevsner described as "original and innovative". The east end of the church which would normally have formed the chancel was used as a Lady chapel, while the main altar is sited under the central tower much closer to the congregation - now a common arrangement but present at St. Alban's from the first. Space for a choir, which in churches at this time was generally seated between the congregation and the altar, was to be provided in a western gallery which was never completed due to a lack of funding.

St. Alban's was one of the first churches Cachemaille-Day designed and it shows the architect's early exploration of the logic of the Liturgical Movement which would come to a fuller expression in the more obviously radical designs of later churches, for example St. Michael's, Northenden.

The east window

The east window is by Christopher Webb (1886–1966), one of the most important stained-glass artists of the mid twentieth century, whose other work in Hampshire includes the east window of the Bishop's Chapel at Wolvesey Palace. The main figures in the window represent Christ flanked on the left by Virgin Mary and St. Boniface, and on the right by St. Alban and St. Wilfrid. The glass was the gift of Mrs F. Watkins in memory of her husband.

== Clergy ==
Vicars of St. Alban's

1932–1946 The Revd Harold Bennett

1946–1967 The Revd Howard Rees-Jones

1968–1976 The Revd Kenneth Bachell

1976–1988 The Revd Frank Chivers

1988–1991 The Revd John Moore (Priest-in-Charge)

In 1992 the parishes of St Alban's and St Mary's were united as Swaythling Parish.

Vicars of Swaythling

1992–1999 The Revd John Moore

2000-2013 The Revd Canon Gary Philbrick

2014–Present The Revd Peter Dockree
