= 286, Southampton =

Coordinates: 50.93817°N 1.38512°W

286
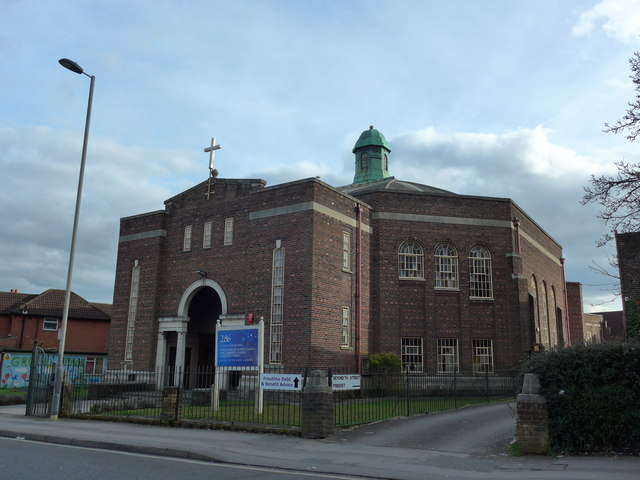

- Shown within Southampton
- OS grid reference: SU 43303 15583
- Location: Swaythling
- Country: England
- Churchmanship: Evangelical

History
- Former name: Swaythling Methodist Church
- Status: Church
- Founded: 1932
- Founder: Herbert Collins

Architecture
- Functional status: Active
- Heritage designation: Grade II listed
- Designated: 20 November 1997
- Architect: Herbert Collins
- Architectural type: Central Hall
- Style: Neo-Georgian

Specifications
- Materials: Red brick, Concrete, Slate, Copper

Administration
- District: Southampton Methodist District

286, formerly Swaythling Methodist Church, is a grade II listed gurdwara and former church building in Swaythling, Southampton. The building was owned and managed by Southampton Methodist Circuit with City Life Church providing assistance with the day-to-day operations. Until the building was sold in 2021, Swaythling Methodist Church continued to meet on the premises in the Nona Bell Centre as a community of St James Road Methodist Church in Shirley, having closed as an official Methodist Church in 2013.

== Building ==
The building includes a number of halls and smaller rooms in addition to the main auditorium, as well as a manse and some workshops. Designed by Herbert Collins in a neo-Georgian style and built in 1932, following his construction of many houses in the surrounding area, with the remit "I have built the houses, now build a place for the people to go". The buildings were constructed in partnership with J. Arthur Rank with full cinema facilities. The projector room is still present. The main auditorium is octagonal with a balcony over the entrance porch; the balcony is accessible via two stair towers on the north face. Attached to the south side is a wing containing other halls and rooms. Separate buildings on the west of the site contain some workshops and the manse. The roof of the main hall is shallowly domed and clad in copper, topped by a copper-clad cupola.

The whole site was grade II listed on 20 November 1997.

In April 2016, the Methodist Council approved the transfer of the building, then valued at £900,000 to City Life Church under the provisions of "Model Trust 20" – a Methodist Church policy that allows buildings to be sold below their value if it enables Christian worship to continue on the premises. The transfer – technically a sale at nil value – was justified on the basis of the significant maintenance costs, with an estimate that over £900,000 worth of repairs to the building were needed.

However, in April 2018 the Council noted that "it has not been possible to find an acceptable form of wording for the requirements for a trust of sale" This was partly because Model Trust 20 included a "reverter" clause which meant that, should a building be subsequently sold by the new owner, net proceeds of that sale should be given to the Methodist Church. The Council therefore adopted a new version of Model Trust 20 that altered these terms.

In 2021, the Methodist Church again altered the Model Trust 20 policy, introducing clause 6: "Once the Council has approved the ‘in principle’ decision to sell for less than best price, completion of the sale must take place within three years from that point." With the under-value sale having been approved in 2016 this meant that the term for selling 286 had expired and it was placed for sale on the open market with a guide price of £1.2 million; it was sold to a Sikh group who then launched a £50,000 renovation plan, converting the building into a Gurdwara.
