= Reinhard Reitzenstein =

Canadian artist (born 1949)

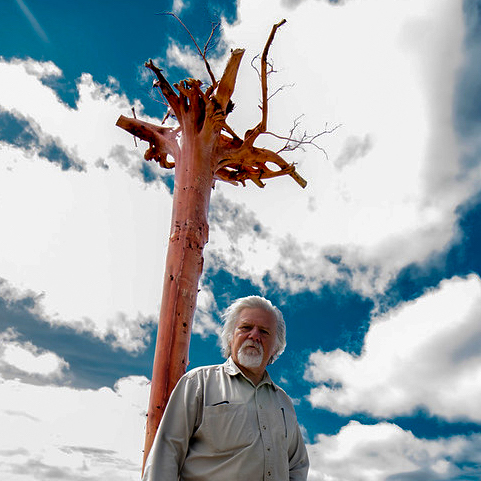
- Reitzenstein in 2017
- Born: May 27, 1949 (age 76); Uelzen, Germany
- Education: Ontario College of Art
- Known for: Environmental sculpture
- Elected: Royal Canadian Academy of Arts

Reinhard Reitzenstein RCA (born 1949) is an environmental sculptor. He creates works through which he investigates ways to unite and interconnect nature, culture, science, and technology. He works in different media and areas, sometimes with the help of volunteers, making installations and sculpture using different materials, including trees, large-scale drawings, prints and sound art.

Following in the wake of earthworks sculptor Robert Smithson in 1969, who turned a tree on its head and stuck it in the ground, Reitzenstein transforms living trees into sculptures. Much of his work centers around the tree as an archetype for the self and the symbiotic relationship humans share with the forests of the world. The tree serves as a marker of the ravages upon, and attempts at reconciliation with nature, he believes. His work is said to illustrate the mechanisms with which trees not only stabilize and rejuvenate our environment but also our senses and our evolution as a species and to represent a desire for preservation of the environment.

== Career ==
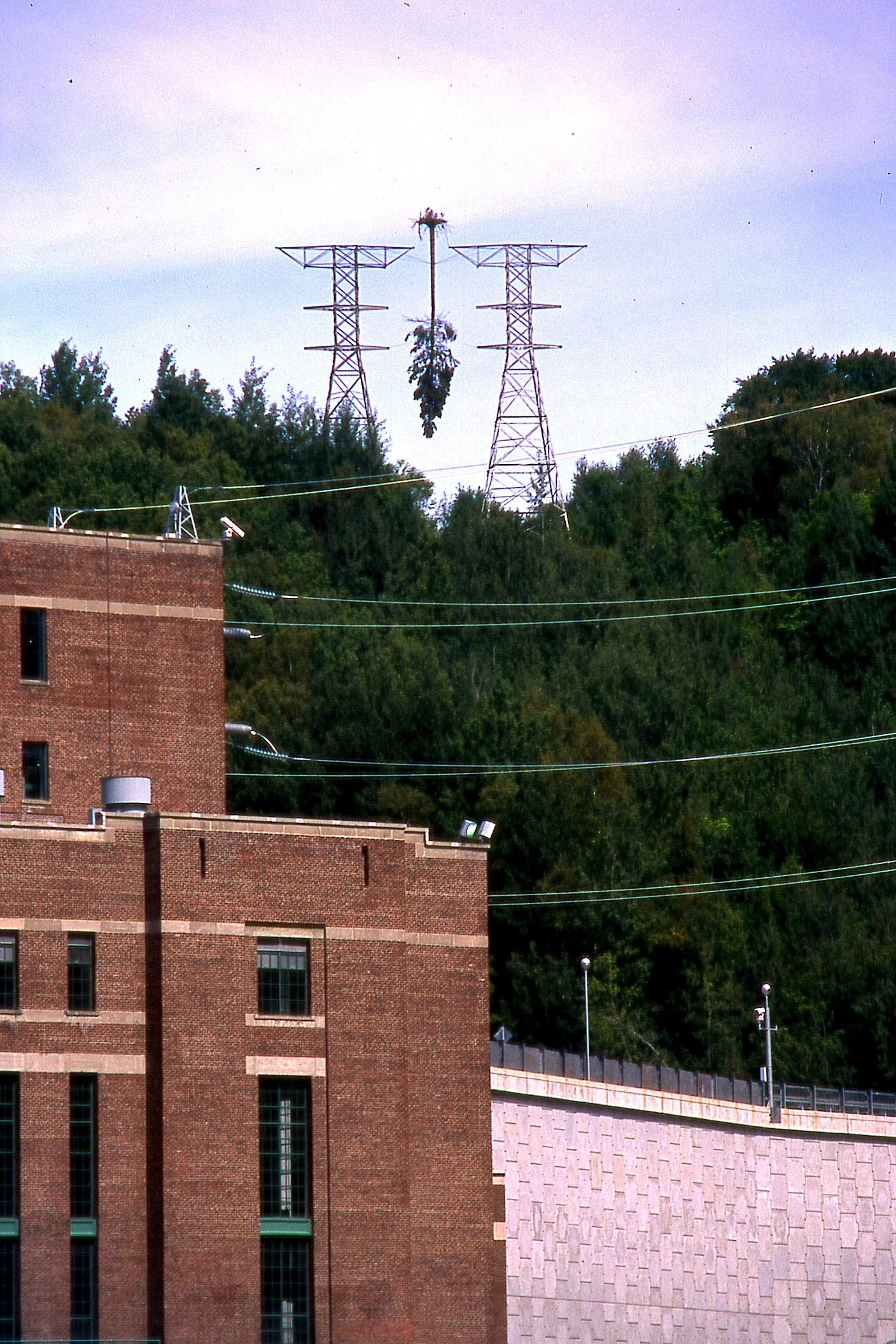
Transformer, 2000 - Trois Rivieres, Parc La Gabel, Quebec, Canada, Sculpture Symposium.

Reitzenstein was born in Uelzen, Germany; he and his family emigrated to Canada in 1956. He studied at the Ontario College of Art in Toronto (1968-1971). He has had decades of experience as a Canadian artist including over 100 solo exhibitions, commenting through his work on the natural environment and its clash with civilization. In 1993, Ted Fraser curated Reinhard Reitzenstein: The World Tree for the Confederation Centre Art Gallery and Museum in Charlottetown.

His visual art can be seen around Canada, with notable works such as Island, River, Sentinels (2003–2004) located in the Ambassador's Court Garden at Rideau Hall in Ottawa and Festival Walkway (2003) located in a walkway at 10 Bellair Street between Bloor Street and Cumberland Avenue in Toronto.

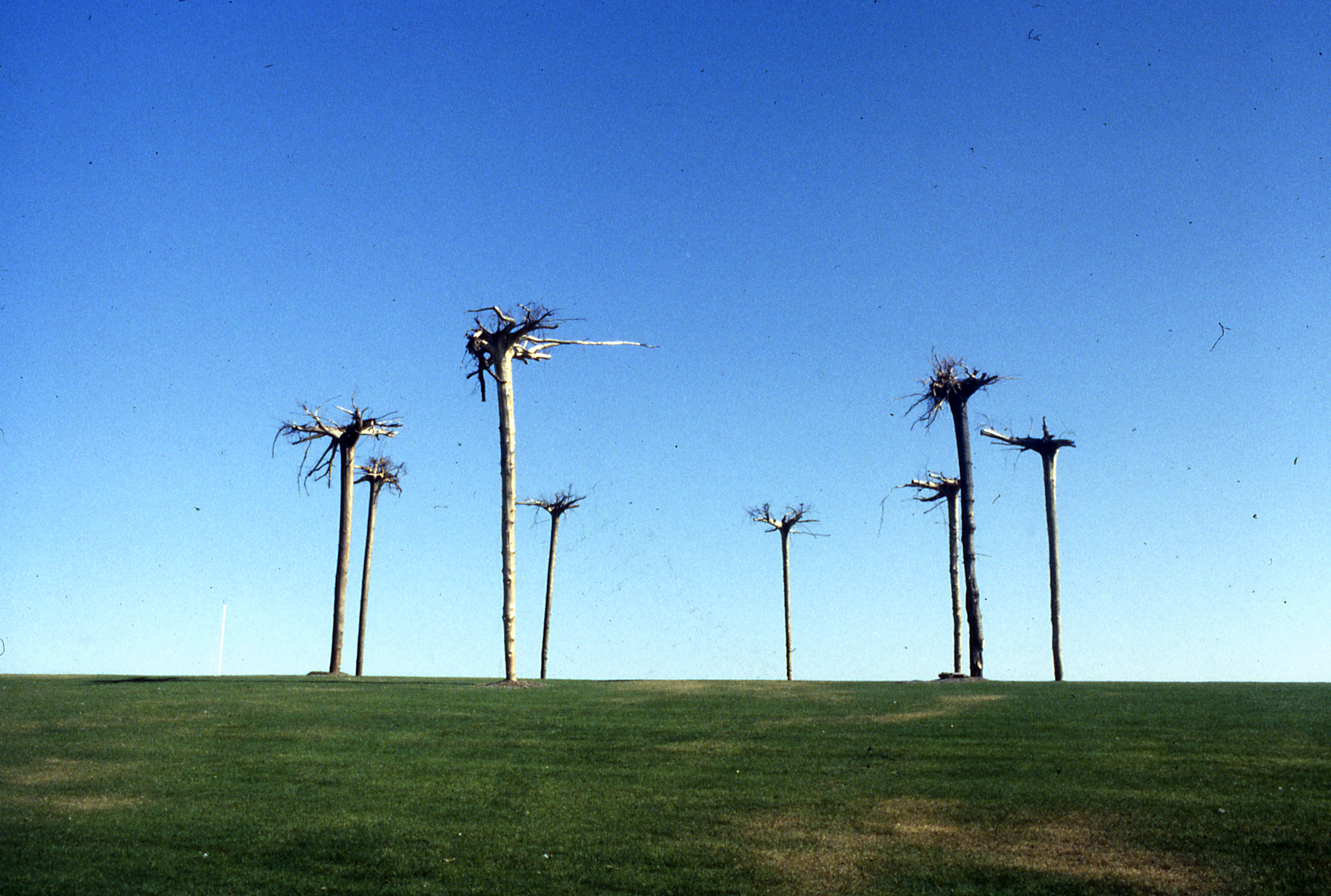
No Title, 1987 - Sault Saint Marie, Canada, Sculpture Festival, Sans Demarcations

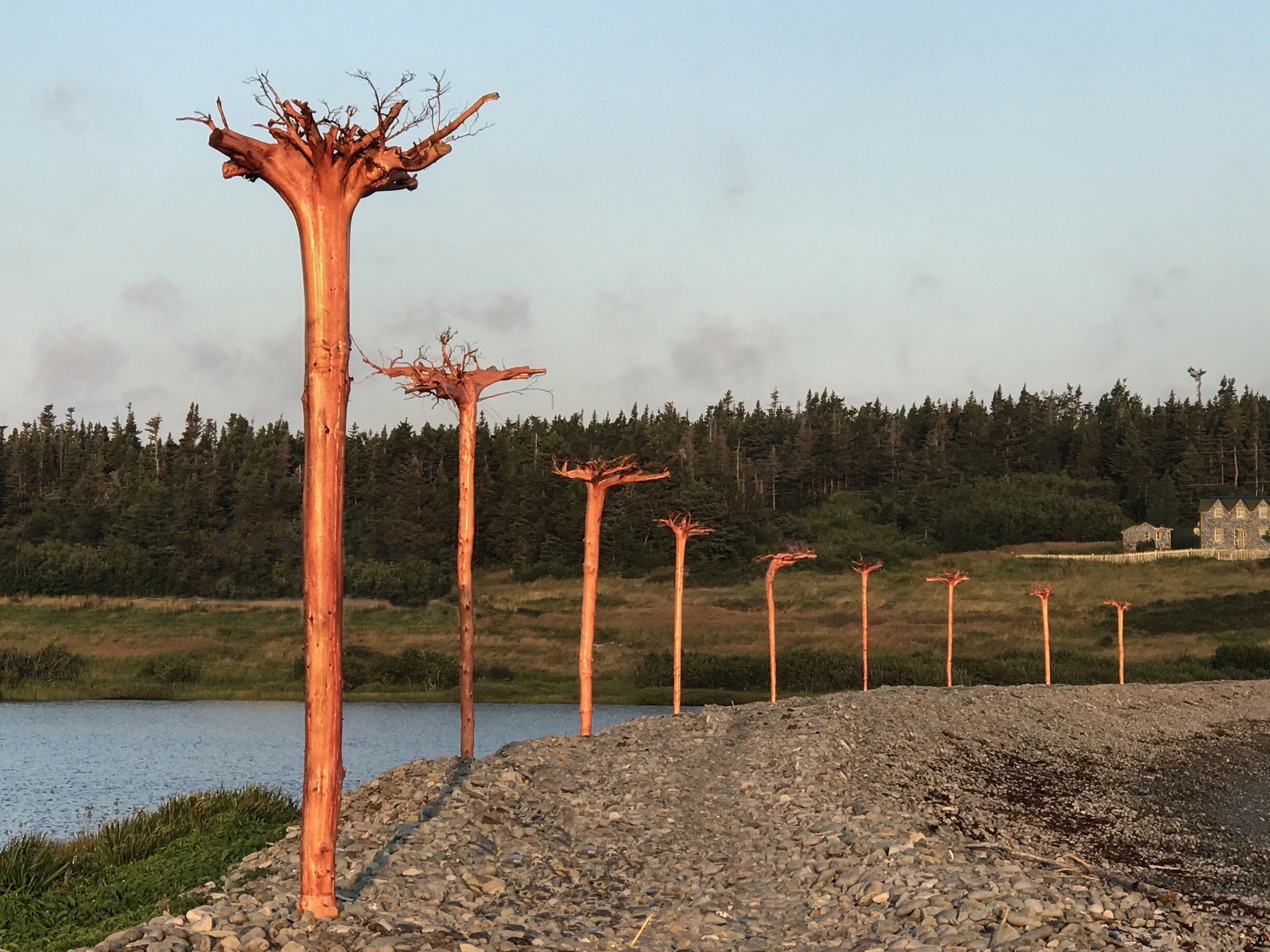
Waiting, Watching, Waiting, 2017 - Knights Cove, Newfoundland, Canada, Bonavista Biennale

In 2017, for the Bonavista Biennale, he created a site-specific sculptural installation of an inverted tree piece, Waiting/Watching/Waiting that took an entire village of helpers in Newfoundland to make. The trees, carefully selected for their height and strength, stripped of their bark and sealed with red ochre and linseed oil were inverted into deep holes that had been dug into a rocky causeway. Their roots were up top like antennae. In 2019, he created a complex tree installation which included large scale woodcut plates and prints at the Buffalo, New York Arts Studio. In 2020, he was Artist in Residence at the Art Gallery of Hamilton and in the year-long period of time created, with the help of volunteers, We All Felt That, 2020, of suspended maple, wool felt, and steel (top) and a large wall drawing with the word for tree in different languages.

His work is in numerous public collections, among them the National Gallery of Canada, the Art Gallery of Ontario, the Canada Council Art Bank, Art Gallery of Hamilton, University of Toronto, Memorial University of Newfoundland, Confederation Centre of the Arts, the Province of Ontario, and the University of Western Ontario. Reitzenstein has been an instructor in sculpture and interdisciplinary studies at the University of Guelph (1980-1998), at Brock University (1991-1994), Queen's University (1997), the Toronto School of Art (1998-2000) and Sheridan College (2000). He has served as the Head of the Sculpture Program in the Department of Art at the College of Arts and Sciences at the University of Buffalo in Buffalo since 2000. His work is represented by the Olga Korper Gallery, Toronto and Indigo Art, Buffalo, New York.
