= Richard Andrews (industrialist) =

Industrialist, philanthropist and politician (1798–1859)

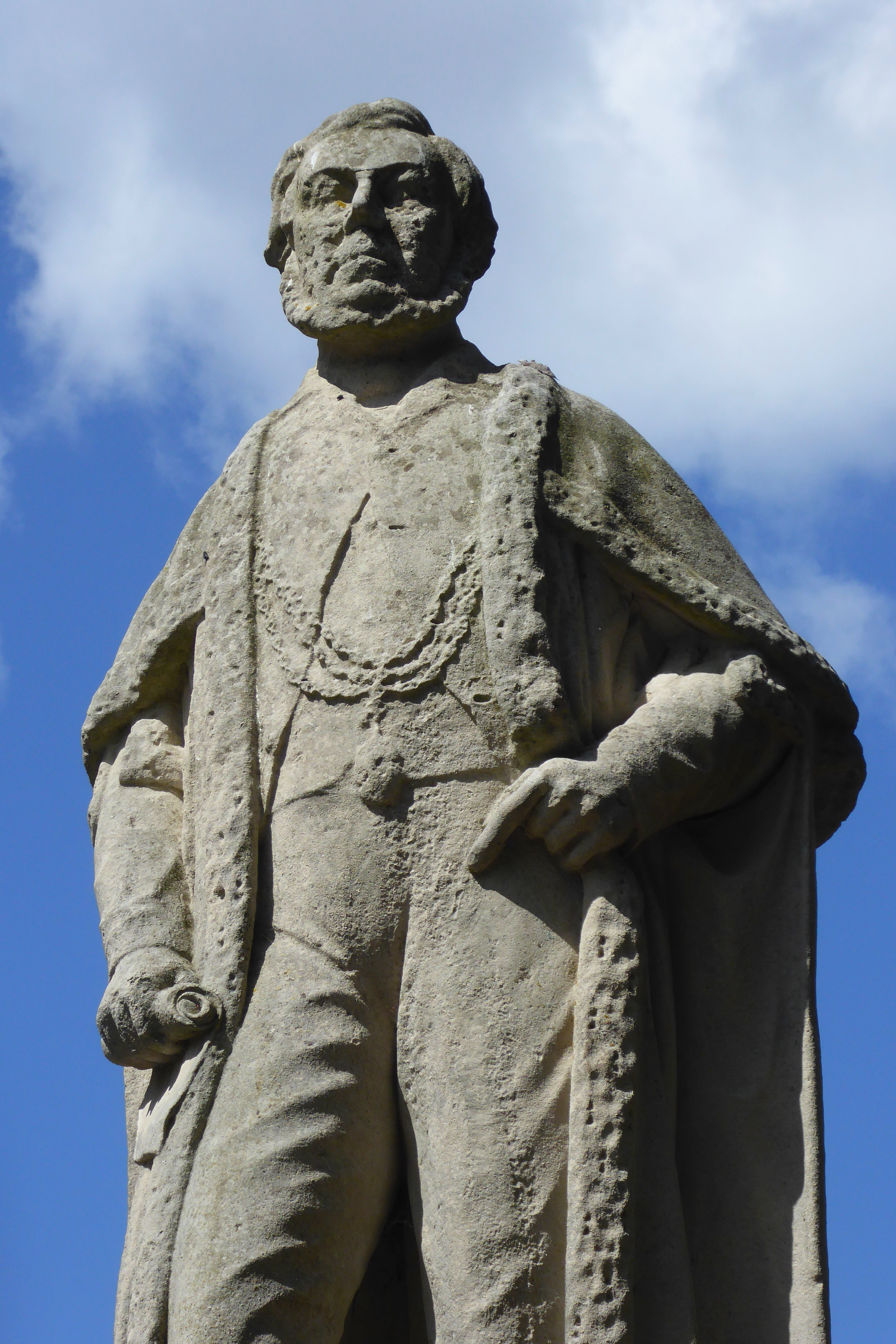
Statue of Richard Andrews in East Park

Richard Andrews (1798–1859) was an industrialist, philanthropist and politician in Southampton.

Richard Andrews was born the son of a wheelwright at Bishop's Sutton. He founded his own coachbuilding business, with a manufacturing site in Above Bar.

He was well-known and respected for his work for the city, and was elected mayor in 1849, for three consecutive years, and again in 1856.

East (Andrews) Park in Southampton is named after him, and features his statue. The original statue, erected in 1860, was a much grander affair, but the limestone weathered poorly, and the pedestal was replaced in 1971.

The full text on the plaque on his statue reads:

Born the son of a wheelwright at Bishop's Sutton, Hampshire he became a coachbuilder of international fame. His manufactory in above Bar was one of the town's leading industries. Five times Mayor of Southampton he was known for his generosity and energy in furthering the prosperity of the town. A good employer, he devoted himself wholeheartedly to promoting the self-reliance of the working man. This statue was erected in 1860 and the pedestal reconstructed in 1971.
