= Herbert Collins =

British architect (1885–1975)

- Born: 1885; Edmonton, London
- Died: 1975 (aged 89–90)
- Occupation: Architect
- Practice: Collins & Calton
- Buildings: 286 (building)
- Projects: Swaythling Housing Society Welwyn Garden City

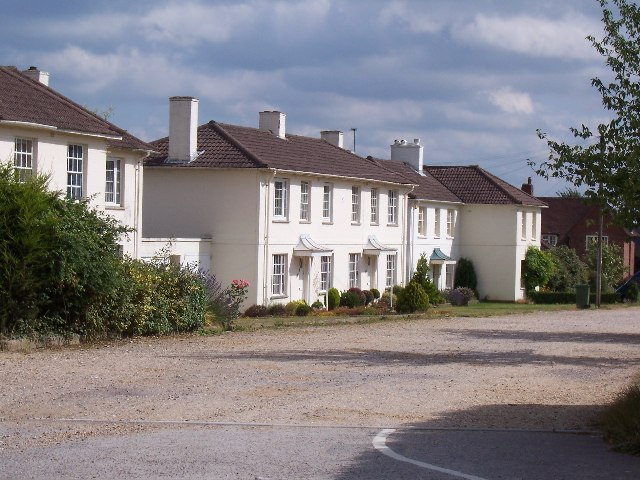
Herbert Collins houses in Ethelburt Avenue, Basset Green

Herbert Collins (1885–1975) was a British architect, born in Edmonton, London. He designed some of the finest suburban developments in the city of Southampton in the 1920s and 1930s.

== Life ==
Collins designed houses in Southampton from 1922, became a director of the Welwyn Garden City Company in 1924 and co-founded the Swaythling Housing society on 26 November 1925. Collins, along with his cofounders, accountant and civic leader Fred Woolley (the society's first chairman) and Bursledon brickworks director Claude Ashby, put up £200 worth of shares. Collins' father, William, loaned the fledgling company £14,000.

Collins lived at 38 Brookvale Road in Highfield, Southampton from 1930 to 1973, and a commemorative English Heritage blue plaque was installed there in July 2004. During his time living there, Collins was responsible for the design of Swaythling Methodist Church in Burgess Road, built in 1932.

In an effort to contribute to the post-war housing efforts, Collins submitted a suggestion to the July 1945 edition of the journal Architectural Design and Construction regarding constructing bungalows from rammed earth combined with a small quantity of cement; his suggestion was repeated in The Architects' Journal in 1946.

In 1957, Collins retired as a fellow of the Royal Institute of British Architects and his professional partnership with J. Normal Calton was dissolved by mutual consent; the pair had been trading as Collins & Calton. At this time, Collins was living at 32 Carlton Crescent in Southampton. Collins' retirement, however, did not mean an end to his interest in architecture and town planning, and in January 1962 a letter from Collins, sent from his Carlton Crescent address, was published in the Journal of the Town Planning Institute.

== Work ==
Collins' housing estates have a distinctive style, usually with rows of terraced houses set around wide areas of greenery.

Collins also made plans for a garden city around Marchwood, but these proposals were unrealised.

=== Rookfield Estate ===
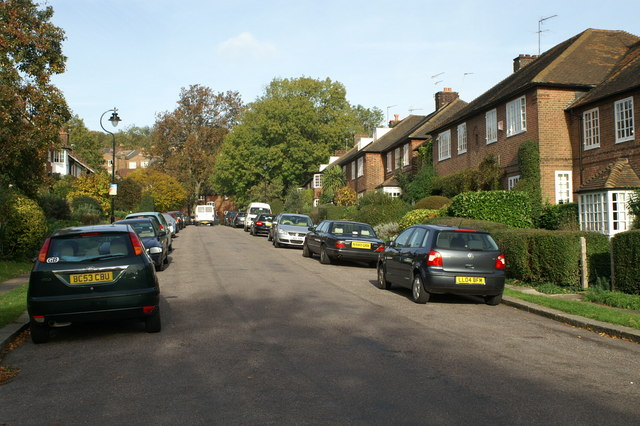
Cascade Avenue

The Rookfield estate (also known as Rookfield Garden Village or Rookfield Garden Estate) is situated near Muswell Hill in the London Borough of Haringey. It comprises Cascade Avenue, Rookfield Avenue and adjacent roads.

The Rookfield Estate conservation area was designated on 26 March 1976 and an Article 4 direction has been in place for the estate since 1978.

Collins' father William Jeffries Collins began the development of the Rookfield estate some time before 1910 on land purchased in 1899. When William Jeffries Collins moved his business to Southampton in 1911, his sons Herbert and William Brannan Collins took over the development. The estate was completed in 1936.

=== Uplands Estate ===
The Uplands estate, in Highfield, Southampton was built between 1922 and 1936. It was the first development undertaken by Herbert Collins in Southampton. The Uplands Estate (Highfield) conservation area was designated in January 1986.

=== Bassett Green Estate ===
The Bassett Green estate comprises Ethelburt Avenue, Stoneham Lane, Basset Green Road and Leaside Way. The estate was developed on land bought by William Jeffries Collins in 1925 with the first Neo-Georgian homes being completed in 1927 on Stoneham Lane. Ethelburt Avenue (Bassett Green Estate) conservation area was designated by Southampton City Council in September 1988.

=== Swaythling Methodist Church ===
Swaythling Methodist Church was built in 1932 in a neo-Georgian style. It is Grade II listed.

=== Climping Village Hall ===
The village hall in Climping West Sussex was designed by Herbert Collins.

=== Orchards Way ===
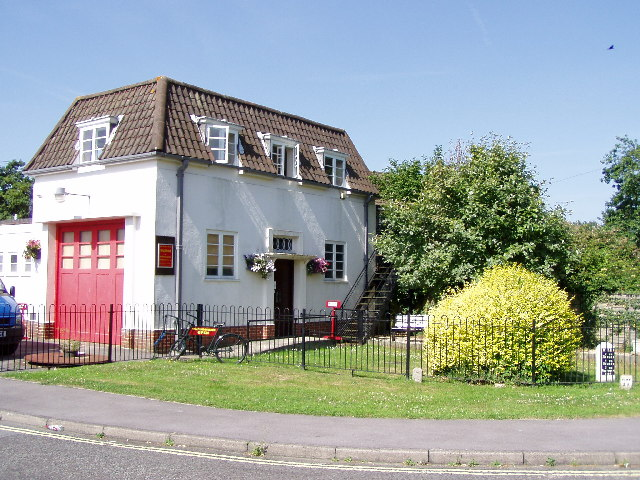
The Collins-designed fire station in West End, Hampshire, now a local history museum

The Orchards Way estate is situated in West End, Hampshire. Designed in 1936 for the Hampshire Rural Cottage Improvement Society, it originally comprised 32 cottages, grouped in short terraces, two shops and a fire station and was more rurally situated than Collins' earlier developments. The Orchards Way conservation area was designated by Eastleigh Borough Council in 1999.

=== Chandler's Ford United Reformed Church ===
Originally Chandler's Ford Congregational Church, the building was designed by Collins in 1929. It has been extended and enlarged since then but the significant elements of the original style retained as shown on the church's website.
