= Reitzenstein =

German noble family

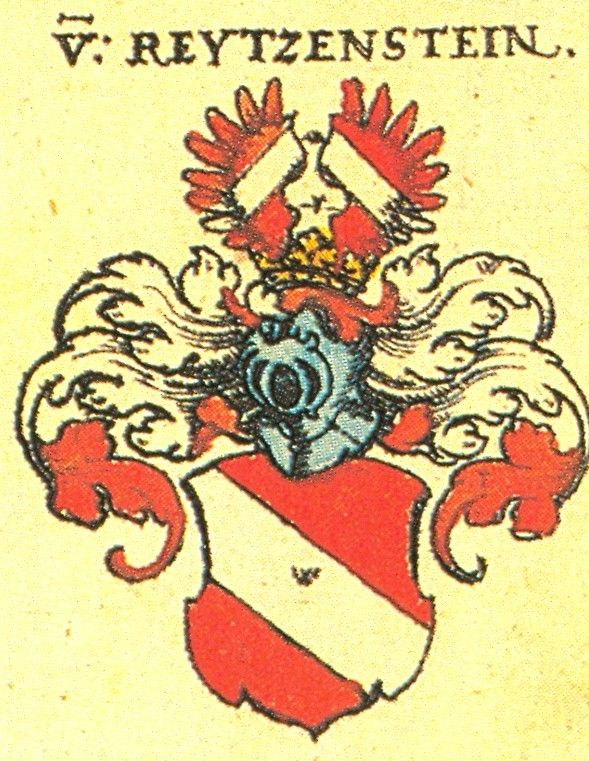
The family's coat of arms in Siebmachers Wappenbuch

The House of Reitzenstein was an old German noble family of Franconian knightly origin. It belonged to the Franconian Uradel.

== History ==
First appearing in written documents from 1318, the House of Reitzenstein took its name from Reitzenstein near Issigau. The family was directly related to the House of Sparneck. Members of the family held the title of Freiherr.

== Notable members ==
- Reinhart Reitzenstein (1949–present), Sculptor
- Franziska von Reitzenstein aka Franz von Nemmersdorf (1834–1896), German novelist
- Hans Albin Freiherr von Reitzenstein, German Obersturmbannführer
- Richard August Reitzenstein (1861–1931), German classical philologist and scholar of Ancient Greek religion, hermetism and Gnosticism
- Sigismund von Reitzenstein (1766–1847), minister and ambassador for Baden
