= Thomas Lee Dummer =

British politician (c.1712–1765)

Thomas Lee Dummer (c. 1712 – 6 October 1765) was an English Member of Parliament for Southampton (1737–1741) and Newport (Isle of Wight) (1765–1768).

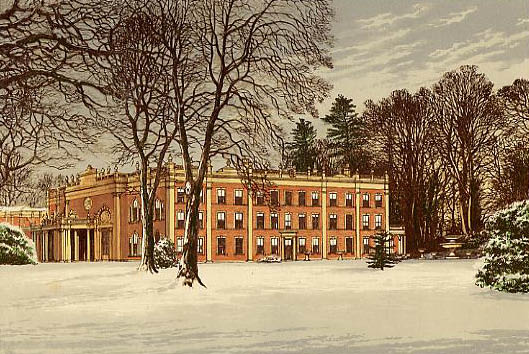
Cranbury Park, near Winchester

== Family ==
Dummer's uncle, Edmund Dummer (1663–1724), was a lawyer who was appointed a Clerk of the Great Wardrobe under Queen Anne in 1706, holding that office until 1721. His father, Thomas, was appointed as Yeoman Tailor and Portitior in 1706 and Deputy Master the following year.

== Appointments ==
On 7 December 1721, Dummer was appointed jointly with J. Baynes as Clerk of the Great Wardrobe to King George I, succeeding his uncle. This office was less senior than the Master of the Great Wardrobe, but was nevertheless a lifetime appointment that conferred a salary of £300 plus livery of £34 and poundage on some goods.

In 1730, Dummer became Lord of the manor at Horninghold in Leicestershire.

In March 1732, Dummer was elected a Fellow of the Royal Society

== Political career ==
In 1737, Dummer succeeded John Conduitt as MP for Southampton on the latter's death. Conduitt had left a daughter, Catherine, whose guardians sold the estate at Cranbury Park near Winchester to Dummer, as well as estates at Weston and Netley, near Southampton.

Dummer continued to represent Southampton for four years until the 1741 election. In 1747, he was elected as MP for Newport on the Isle of Wight and continued to represent that town until his death in 1765. On his death, his estates were left to his son, Thomas (1739–1781), who also succeeded him as MP for Newport.

== Sources ==
- Bucholz, R O, ed. (2006). "Independent Sub-departments: Great Wardrobe 1660–1782". Office-Holders in Modern Britain: Volume 11 (Revised), Court Officers, 1660–1837. London: British History Online. pp. 146–156.

Parliament of Great Britain
Preceded by Sir William Heathcote; John Conduitt	Member of Parliament for Southampton; 1737–1741; With: Sir William Heathcote	Succeeded by Peter Delmé; Edward Gibbon
Preceded by Anthony Chute; Monoux Cope	Member of Parliament for Newport (Isle of Wight); 1747–1765; With: Captain Bluett Wallop 1747–1749; Ralph Jenison 1749–1758; Rear-Admiral Charles Holmes 1758–1762; William Rawlinson Earle 1762–1765	Succeeded by Thomas Dummer; William Rawlinson Earle
