= Philip Cunliffe-Owen =

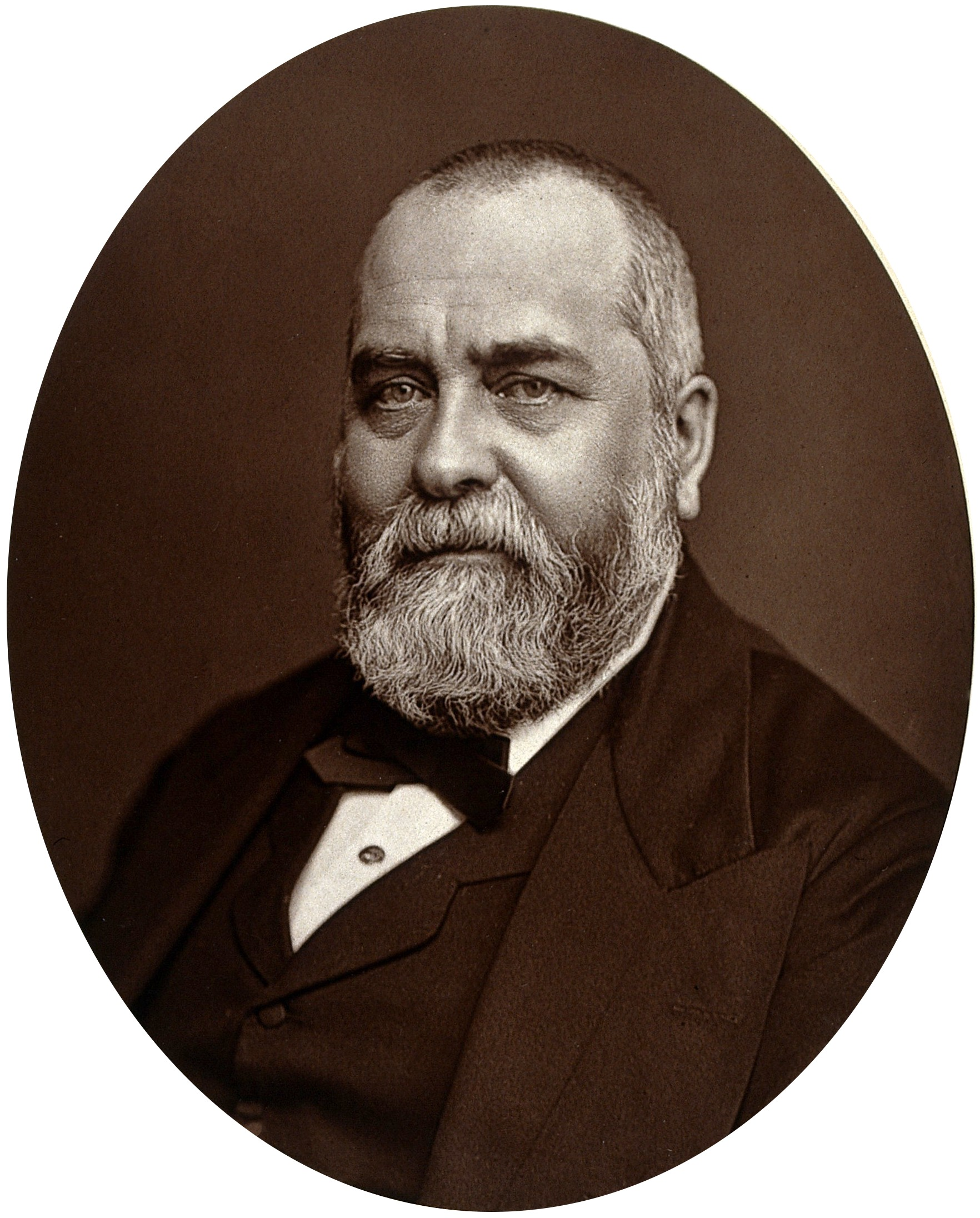
Sir Philip Cunliffe-Owen

Sir Francis Philip Cunliffe-Owen KCB KCMG CIE FRSA (8 June 1828 – 23 March 1894) was an exhibition organizer and the Director of the South Kensington Museum in London.

== Early life ==
Philip Cunliffe-Owen was a British subject born in Switzerland, the son of Captain Charles Cunliffe-Owen RN (1786-1872) and his wife, Mary Peckwell Blosset, daughter of Sir Robert Henry Blosset, who served as Chief Justice of Bengal.

== Biography ==
At the age of 12, he joined the Royal Navy, served in the Mediterranean and West Indies, but left after five years due to poor health.

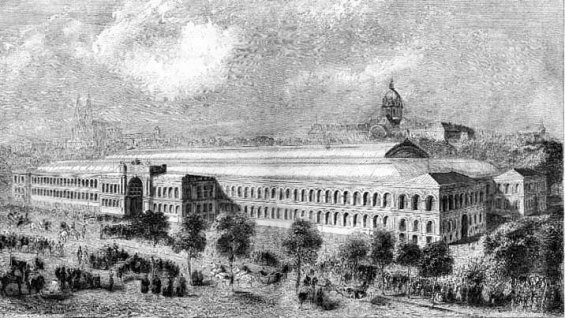
The Paris Exposition Universelle (1855), which Philip Cunliffe-Owen helped to organize.

In 1854, his elder brother, Henry Charles Cunliffe-Owen, helped him to obtain a position in the newly formed Department of Science and Art. The secretary of the department was Henry Cole (later to be the first Director of the South Kensington Museum). Cole appointed Cunliffe-Owen as one of the superintendents of the British section in the 1855 Exposition Universelle, held at Paris. Cunliffe-Owen was an expert in French, which proved very helpful.

In 1857, Cunliffe-Owen became deputy general superintendent of the new South Kensington Museum. In 1860, he was promoted to be Assistant Director in 1860, second in command to Henry Cole, who was the Director.

Cunliffe-Owen acted as director of the foreign sections for the 1862 International Exhibition in London. He helped Cole as assistant executive commissioner for the Paris 1867 Exposition Universelle. He was appointed secretary of the Royal Commission and to represent Britain at the 1873 Weltausstellung in Vienna, Austria, reporting to the Edward, Prince of Wales.

For the 1876 Centennial Exhibition in Philadelphia, US, Cunliffe-Owen was Great Britain's executive commissioner for Great Britain and visited the United States to make the initial arrangements. Two years later, Cunliffe-Owen was again Secretary of the Royal Commission for the Paris 1878 Exposition Universelle.

In 1876, he was elected as a member to the American Philosophical Society.

In 1893, on Cunliffe-Owen's retirement as Director, the South Kensington Museum was split into the Victoria and Albert Museum and the Science Museum.

== Honours ==
In 1864, Cunliffe-Owen was elected a member of the Society of Arts and in 1879 he was appointed to the society's council. He was invested as a Companion of the Order of the Indian Empire, invested as a Knight Commander of the Order of St Michael and St George, and invested as a Knight Commander of the Order of the Bath. He received a number of foreign decorations, including Grand Officier of the French Légion d'honneur.

== Personal life ==
On 12 May 1854, Cunliffe-Owen married Elisa Amalie Philippine Julie Freiin von Reitzenstein (1830-1894), known as "Jenny", daughter of German Baron Friedrich Ernst Georg Fritz von Reitzenstein (1791-1845) and his wife, Pauline Henriette Luise von Roeder (d. 1849). He had ten children in all. The tobacco industrialist, Sir Hugo Cunliffe-Owen (1870–1947), was his ninth child and his youngest son. Another son, Frederick, became a newspaper columnist in New York City. Cunliffe-Owen died of heart disease in Lowestoft, Suffolk, on 23 March 1894.
