= Cunliffe-Owen baronets =

Baronetcy in the Baronetage of the United Kingdom

The Cunliffe-Owen Baronetcy, of Bray in the County of Berkshire, is a title in the Baronetage of the United Kingdom. It was created on 2 February 1920 for the industrialist Hugo Cunliffe-Owen. He was chairman and president of the British-American Tobacco Company.

Sir Philip Cunliffe-Owen, father of the first Baronet, was Director of the South Kensington Museum (now the Victoria and Albert Museum) from 1874 to 1893.

== Cunliffe-Owen baronets, of Bray (1920) ==
- Sir Hugo Cunliffe-Owen, 1st Baronet (1870–1947)
- Sir Dudley Herbert Cunliffe-Owen, 2nd Baronet (1923–1983), married Juliana Eveline, a daughter of Richard Curzon, 2nd Viscount Scarsdale, later divorced.
- Sir Hugo Dudley Cunliffe-Owen, 3rd Baronet (born 1966)

There is no heir to the baronetcy.
