= Hugo Cunliffe-Owen =

English industrialist (1870–1947)

Sir Hugo Cunliffe-Owen Bt
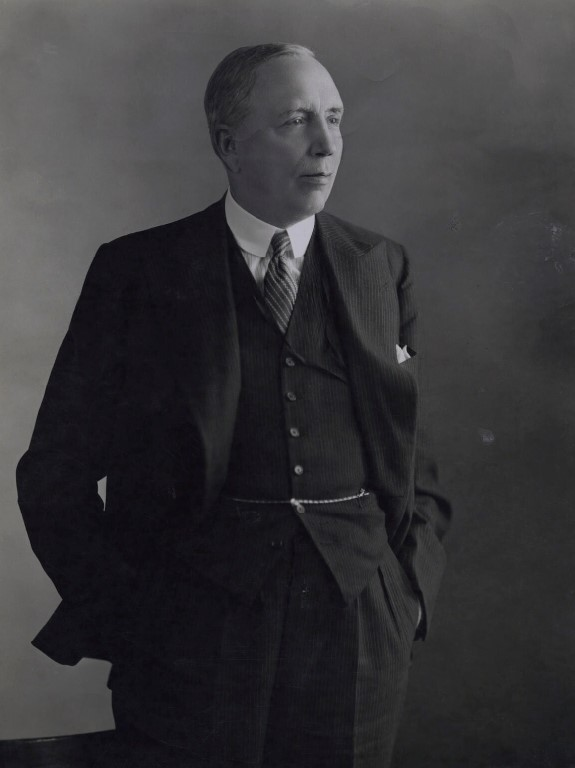
- Portrait by Hay Wrightson

Chairman of the British-American Tobacco Company
- In office 1923–1945

Personal details
- Born: 16 August 1870 Kensington, London, England
- Died: 14 December 1947 (aged 77)

Sir Hugo Cunliffe-Owen, 1st Baronet (16 August 1870 – 14 December 1947) was an English industrialist.

== Childhood ==
Cunliffe-Owen was born in Kensington, London, the younger son of Sir Philip Cunliffe-Owen, director of the South Kensington Museum. He was educated at Brighton College and then Clifton College.

== Career ==
Cunliffe-Owen articled as a civil engineer with Sir John Wolfe-Barry. He first went into business in Bristol, where he was assistant to Henry Herbert (Harry) Wills, his brother-in-law and managing director of W.D. & H.O. Wills Ltd. In this capacity, he played a significant role in the formation of the Imperial Tobacco Company of Great Britain & Ireland company in 1901. He became a director of the British-American Tobacco Company on its formation in 1902, later becoming vice-chairman, and chairman from 1923 until his retirement in 1945. For the last two years of his life, he was president of the company. He also served on the Board of Directors of the Canadian Car and Foundry in Canada until 1940.

He was chairman of Cunliffe-Owen Aircraft Ltd until his death in 1947. He was also associated with British and Foreign Aviation Ltd, a company with a nominal capital of £250,000. its stated objects were to acquire not less than 90 per cent of the issued share capital of Olley Air Service Ltd and Air Commerce Ltd and to make agreements between Olley Air Service Ltd, Sir Hugo Cunliffe-Owen, and others to operate air services and aerodromes and manufacture, deal in, and repair aircraft. Associated companies included West Coast Air Services Ltd and Isle of Man Air Services.

Cunliffe-Owen worked for the Ministry of Information during the First World War, and for this he was created a baronet in the 1920 New Year Honours.

== Family and private life ==
Cunliffe-Owen lived at Sunningdale Park in Berkshire. He married Helen Elizabeth Oliver in 1918. They had two sons and two daughters. She died in 1934, and the following year Cunliffe-Owen remarried, to Mauricia Martha Shaw of California. They were legally separated in 1946.

Cunliffe-Owen's mistress, former dancer Marjorie Daw, at his request, changed her name by deed poll to Cunliffe-Owen prior to his death. In his will, he left Marjorie half his £1,354,000 fortune, and nothing to his legal wife, Mauricia, from whom he was separated. Mauricia took out a £1,000,000 lawsuit again Marjorie for enticing away her husband and for damages for alleged libels; this action was unsuccessful and withdrawn from the court.

His eldest son, Sub-Lieutenant Hugo Leslie Cunliffe-Owen, was killed serving with the Fleet Air Arm aboard the aircraft carrier HMS Indomitable on 12 August 1942, aged 21. His second son, Dudley Herbert, succeeded him in the baronetcy and at Cunliffe-Owen Aircraft.

Cunliffe-Owen was a prominent supporter of Thoroughbred horse racing. He won The Derby with his horse Felstead in 1928, although the best horse he owned was probably the filly Rockfel.

== Footnotes ==
Business positions
Preceded by James Buchanan Duke	Chairman of the British-American Tobacco Company; 1923–1945	Succeeded by Gray Miller
Baronetage of the United Kingdom
New title	Baronet (of Bray); 1920–1947	Succeeded by Dudley Herbert Cunliffe-Owen
