= St Nicolas Church, North Stoneham =

- St Nicolas Parish Church
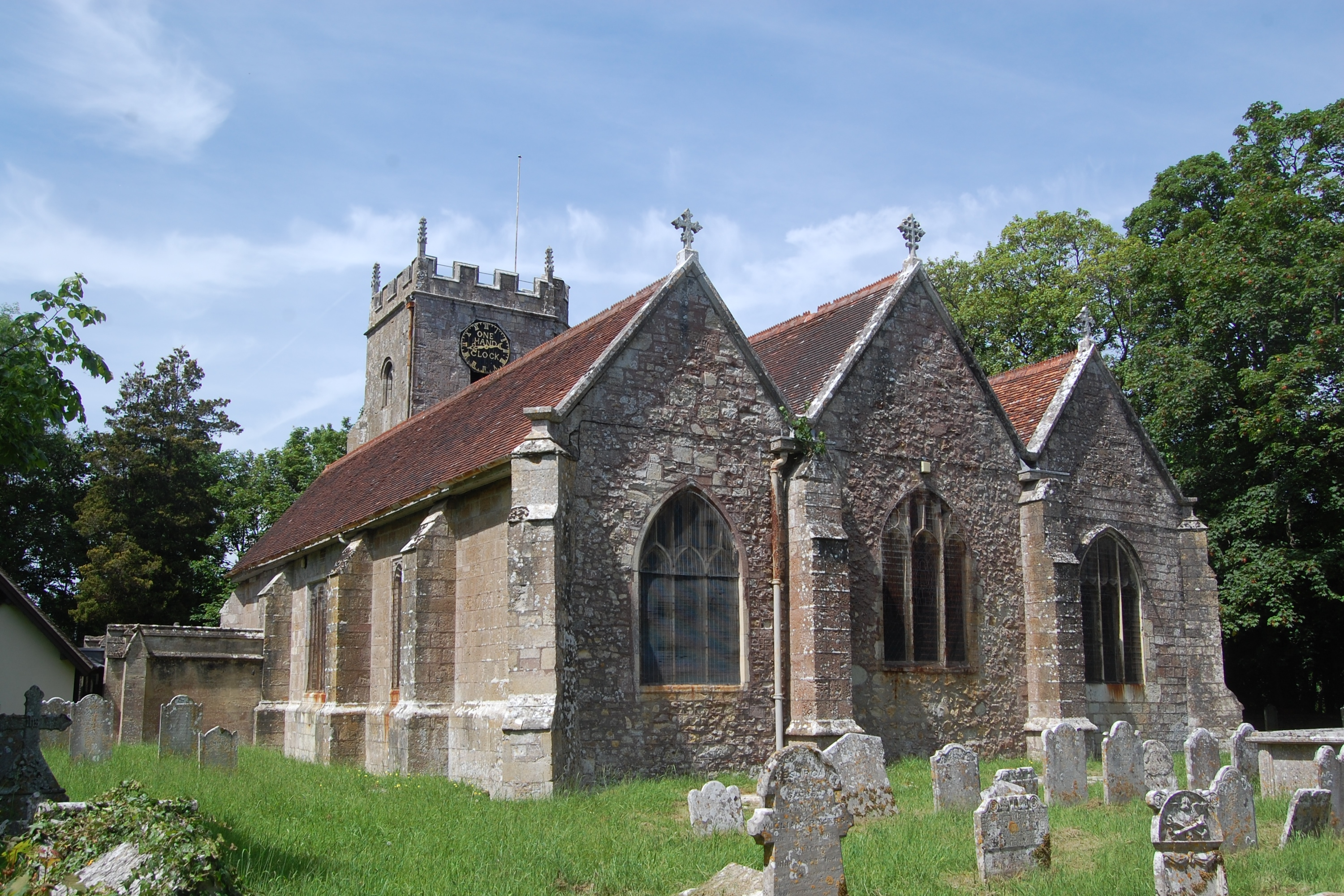
- The church from the southeast

- Shown within Hampshire
- 50.9535°N 1.3740°W
- OS grid reference: SU 44056 17308
- Location: Stoneham Lane, North Stoneham, Hampshire
- Country: England
- Denomination: Anglican
- Website: nsab.org.uk

History
- Status: Parish church
- Founded: 15th century
- Dedication: St Nicolas

Architecture
- Functional status: Active
- Heritage designation: Listed building - Grade II*
- Architectural type: Church
- Style: Gothic survival

Specifications
- Materials: Ashlar

Administration
- Province: Canterbury
- Diocese: Winchester
- Archdeaconry: Bournemouth
- Deanery: Southampton
- Parish: North Stoneham and Bassett

Clergy
- Bishop: Bishop of Southampton
- Rector: In vacancy

St Nicolas Church is an Anglican parish church at North Stoneham, Hampshire which originated before the 15th century and is known for its "One Hand Clock" which dates from the early 17th century, and also for various memorials to famous individuals.

== Location ==
The church is situated on Stoneham Lane, on the edge of the former Stoneham Park. Pevsner and Lloyd, in their Buildings of England: Hampshire and the Isle of Wight, described the setting: "The church is in rural isolation on the edge of the former park, in the midst of a narrow but effective green belt between Eastleigh and Southampton".

== History ==
The parish of North Stoneham can be traced back to the early 9th century when it was known as "Stonam Abbatis" or "Abbots Stoneham" and was attached to Hyde Abbey at Winchester. At this time, the parish extended from the River Itchen in the east towards Chilworth and Bassett Green in the west with its neighbouring parish, South Stoneham, to the south and east. Today, the parish is part of the combined parish of North Stoneham and Bassett, and St. Nicolas is one of three churches serving the parish, the others being St. Michael & All Angels, in Bassett Avenue, and All Saints in Winchester Road.

St. Nicolas is medieval in origin, and has probably been the site of a place of worship for 1,000 years. The church is a Grade II* listed building, and the listing states that the church was "built on (the) site of a 13th-century Church and possibly a Saxon Chapel".

According to Pevsner, the church was rebuilt at some time between 1590 and 1610 (about the time that the estate was sold to the Fleming family) in an "interesting Gothic survival manner", but incorporating older features (not necessarily from the previous church on the site). It was restored in 1826 by Thomas Hopper, and restored again (by George Bodley) in the late 19th century.

The new vestry was completed in 2008.

== Lych gate ==
The lych-gate was built in 1909 in memory of Emily Macarthur, the wife of James Macarthur, the then Bishop of Southampton. It was designed by Isle of Wight architect Percy Stone, and built of oak timber taken from HMS Thunderer which took part in the Battle of Trafalgar.

== The church exterior ==
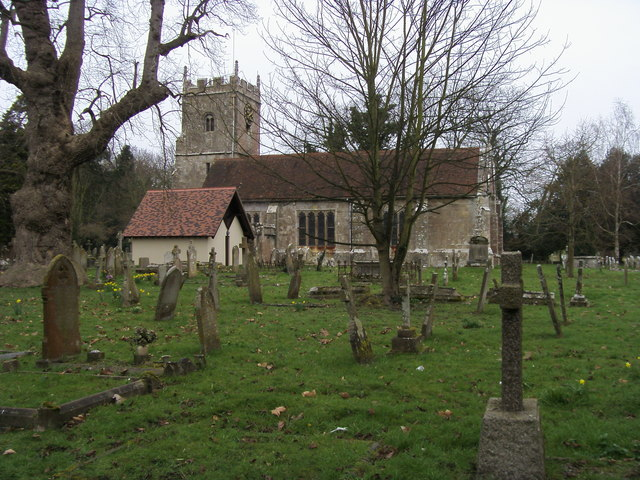
2008 view of the church, showing the new vestry

Pevsner described the church as:

an intriguing and problematical building, with a three-gabled east termination and a west tower, looking like a Devon church. Nave, chancel, and aisles continuing into chapels; a rectangle except for the tower and north porch.

The church has ashlar walling stepped buttresses, diagonally placed on the corners, comprising a high plinth with late moulded step. Set in the western wall, in the tower, is a 13th-century window of three lancets, the centre one higher. According to Pevsner, "It was probably the east window of a church of some pretension", which was re-used when the tower was built in the 16th century. The window has been dated from 1230.

The east window of the chancel is 15th-century in style, with three cinquefoiled lights with tracery. Pevsner described the east and west aisle windows as: "three-light Perpendicular in arched frames, but differing in details and looking, for the most part, authentically medieval; all or some of them are probably re-used."

The north and south aisle windows are late Gothic in character, from the 16th century, although they have been repaired several times, modern cusping being inserted. In the north aisle there are four windows, the eastern of two cinquefoiled lights with tracery under a pointed head, the next two square-headed, of three and four cinquefoiled lights respectively, and the fourth also square-headed, of three cinquefoiled lights. Between the third and fourth windows is a round-headed north doorway with a plain quarter-round moulding of uncertain but not ancient date; Pevsner described the porch as "Elizabethan-looking".

The south aisle windows are all square-headed, of three or four lights. The details of the windows are not uniform, the west window of the south aisle, and the four-light window in the north aisle, "being of better style than the rest".

The roof is in three sections with red tiles, finials and raised coping to the gables. The vestry, which was built in 2008, is situated at the south-west corner of the church.

=== The tower and bells ===
The tower is built of ashlar, in two tall stages, with plain double bell-openings in arched frames on three sides, battlements, and thin crocketed pinnacles, with an octagonal stair turret on the north-east corner, and dates from about 1600.

The church has a long history of bell ringing and the current ring of ten bells was once the lightest ten in the country. The ring is accommodated on two frames one above the other, with the lower frame partly made up of the 17th-century frame from the earliest recorded installation of bells in St. Nicolas. In his 1908 "A History of the County of Hampshire", William Page reported:

"There are six bells by Taylor of Loughborough, 1893. The former ring was of three, by I H., 1651, Antony Bond, 1623, and a Salisbury founder, c. 1400."

Of the present bells, three were cast by Taylor in 1931 and the remaining seven in 1956.

In 2006, the parish launched an appeal to raise £15,000 in order to stabilise the bell-frame and improve the bell handling. The fund-raising activities included a Teddy bear parachute jump.

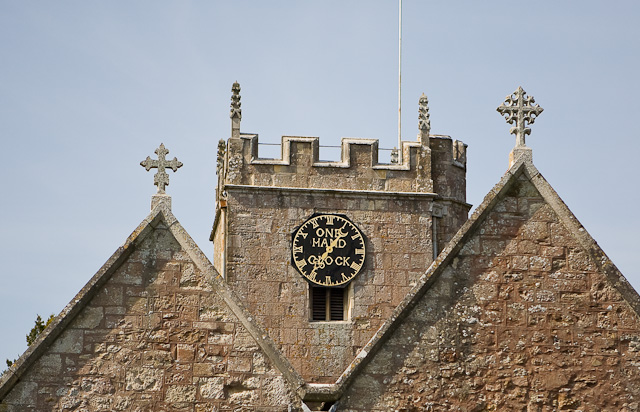
The self-described "One Hand Clock"

=== The clock ===
On the eastern face of the tower is the church clock, which has only one hand, pointing to the hour. The "One Hand Clock" was originally installed in the early 17th century; the movement is by William Monk (died 1753) of Berwick St. John and Donhead St Mary.

At the time the clock was installed, "time was counted in hours, not minutes".

The clock has had to be restarted a number of times in its history, the movement being renovated most recently in 1995, when members of the local Concorde Club, among others, helped to restore and maintain the clock by giving some "time", i.e. £2.50 per minute, the target being £150.

== The church interior ==
The church has a chancel 25 ft (7.6 m) long and 15 ft (4.6 m) wide, with a nave of 35 ft 9 in (10.9 m) and aisles which run the full length of the nave and chancel, 11 ft 5 in (3.5 m) and 11 ft 2 in (3.4 m) wide respectively. The tower is 10 ft (3.0 m) by 9 ft 6 in (2.9 m).

The aisle walls are made of ashlar, mainly perpendicular in character. The east wall of the chancel is built of rubble, and is earlier than the ashlar walls of the aisles and chapels, believed to be part of the medieval church. The nave arcades, of three bays with octagonal pillars and arches of two chamfered orders, are probably 15th-century, while the two bays on either side of the chancel are of pseudo-Gothic character, and apparently of late 18th or early 19th-century date. Two of the pillars are Early English.

The organ is situated at the east end of the north chancel aisle and was originally manufactured in about 1935 by the Positive Organ Company of north-west London and renovated in 1974 and 1993.

The 15th-century font, which has an octagonal bowl of Purbeck marble on a modern stone stem, is under the east arch of the tower.

=== Windows ===
A series of heraldic windows (1826) by John Absalom Edwards of Winchester, under the supervision of the architect Thomas Hopper, illustrated the ancestry of the Fleming family, but were shattered by a bomb blast in the Second World War. The fragments have been reset in the windows.

=== The porch ===
For some time, the porch contained two First World War Roll of Honour memorial panels in lead, fashioned by the controversial artist, Eric Gill. They were removed from the Stoneham War Shrine and located in the church porch while renovations to the War Shrine were carried out. They were returned to the War Shrine when its renovations were completed in 2010.

== Memorials ==
=== Slavonian tomb-stone ===
On the chancel floor is a gravestone inscribed to Slavonian merchants. The tombstone is bluish limestone slab, 6 ft 8 in (2.0 m) by 3 ft 8 in (1.1 m) bearing a shield charged with a double-headed eagle surrounded by Gothic foliage; round the edge of the slab runs a marginal inscription with the evangelistic symbols at the four angles — "Sepultura De La Schola De Sclavoni Año Dñi MCCCCLXXXXI" ("The Burial Place of the Guild of Slavonians").

The tomb originated in the 15th century when a fair was held at Winchester starting on St. Giles' Day in early September. The fair was held on St. Giles' Hill to the east of the city centre. At the time, this was the largest fair in Europe; for the sixteen days of the fair, all other trading at Southampton and at every place within seven leagues of Winchester was prohibited, and the Bishop of Winchester received the revenues normally due to the King.

Among the many foreigners who attended the fair were some who formed themselves into a guild — the "Schola dei Sclavoni" or Guild of Slavonians. Their business was so great that in 1491 they purchased a vault in North Stoneham church where they might inter any of their guild who should chance to die in England. The need for their vault soon arose, for in 1499 highwaymen attacked their trade convoy between Southampton and Winchester and killed two of their number.

William Erasmus Darwin (1839–1914), the eldest child of the naturalist Charles Darwin, was buried in the church.

=== The monument to Lord Hawke ===
In the south aisle there is an elaborate wall memorial to Admiral Lord Hawke, with a detailed depiction of the Battle of Quiberon Bay (20 November 1759). Lord Hawke was the First Lord of the Admiralty who lived at Swaythling House. He died in Sunbury-on-Thames in 1781 and although he had not lived in Swaythling for some time, he chose to be buried with his wife. His son the second baron, erected the magnificent memorial to him, carved in white marble, in 1783, the work of sculptor John Francis Moore. It includes a bas-relief of the painting of "The Battle of Quiberon Bay" by Dominic Serres, the Elder.

Over the weekend of 20 November 2009, the church was the focus of special events held to commemorate the 250th anniversary of the Battle.

In addition to the memorial to the admiral, the church has another to his wife, Catherine: "the best Wife, the best Mother and the best of Friends".

=== The Sir Thomas Fleming monument ===
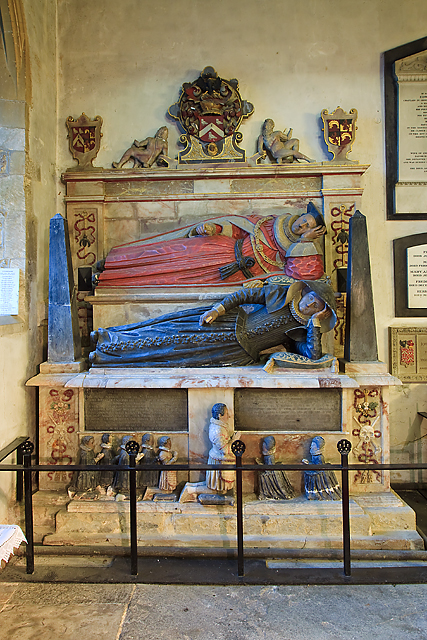
The tomb of Sir Thomas Fleming and his wife

At the east end of the south aisle, on the south side, is the monument to Sir Thomas Fleming, Lord Chief Justice, who was one of the judges at the trial of Guy Fawkes in 1605, and died in 1613. This memorial is known locally as "the floating Flemings", depicting Lord and Lady Fleming in their scarlet and blue court robes, lying on their sides, with kneeling figures of the six sons and two daughters who survived him. The inscription is in two panels on the base, and above the effigies are the arms of the Fleming and James families. The inscription reads:

In most Assvred Hope of A Blessed Resvrection, Here Lyeth Interred ye Bodie of Sir Thomas Flemyng, Knight, Lord Chief Jvstice of England; Great Was His Learning, Many Were His Virtves. He Always Feared God & God Still Blessed Him & ye Love & Favour Both of God & Man Was Daylie Upon Him. He Was In Especiall Grace & Favour With 2 Most Worthie & Virtvovs Princes Q. Elizabeth & King James. Many Offices and Dygnities Were Conferred Upon Him. He Was First Sargeant At Law, Then Recorder of London; Then Solicitor Generall to Both ye Said Princes. Then Lo: Chief Baron of ye Exchequer & after Lo: Chief Jvstice of England. All Which Places He Did Execvte With So Great Integrity, Justice & Discretion that Hys Lyfe Was Of All Good Men Desired, His Death Of All Lamented. He Was Borne at Newporte In ye Isle Of Wight, Brough Up In Learning & ye Studie Of ye Lawe. In ye 26 Yeare Of His Age He Was coopled in ye Blessed State of Matrimony To His Virtvovs Wife, ye La: Mary Fleming, With whom He Lived & Continewed In that Blessed Estate By ye Space Of 43 Yeares. Having By Her In that Tyme 15 Children, 8 Sonnes & 7 Davghters, Of Whom 2 Sonnes & 5 Davghters Died In His Life Time. And Afterwards In Ripeness of Age and Fulness of Happie yeares yt Is to Saie ye 7th Day of Avgvst 1613 in ye 69 Yeare Of His Age, He Left This Life For a Better, Leaving Also Behind Him Livinge Together With His Virtvovs Wife 6 Soones & 2 Davghters.

There are many other memorials to members of the Fleming family including a monument to John Fleming (died 1802), and a portrait tablet to John Willis Fleming (died 1844) by the Chilworth sculptor, Richard Cockle Lucas.

== The church today ==
Although situated in a rural area the church has a faithful congregation with regular Sunday morning and afternoon services.

=== Clergy ===
The clergy are shared between the three churches of the Parish: St Michael and All Angels, St Nicolas, and All Saints' Church, Bassett. The most recent Rector, the Reverend Sheena Williams, was invested by the Bishop of Southampton, the Right Reverend Dr Jonathan Frost, on 3 February 2017. Rev'd Williams grew up in Linlithgow, near Edinburgh. She gained a law degree from the University of Aberdeen and Pierre Mendès-France University in France. After feeling a call to ordained ministry she trained at STETS (Southern Theological Education and Training Scheme) in Salisbury before ordination in 2010. She served her title in the Parish of Swaythling, Southampton, before becoming Associate Priest in the Parish of Chandlers Ford. Together, they share the ministry to the three churches of the Parish: St Michael and All Angels, St. Nicolas and All Saints.

== Stoneham rectory ==
The 19th-century rectory, which stands on the opposite side of Stoneham lane, is a Grade II listed building. It is now part of an office complex, which until 2021 was an office for Mott MacDonald.

The former gateway to the rectory in Stoneham Lane is also listed, Grade II.
