= St Michael and All Angels Church, Bassett =

St. Michael and All Angels
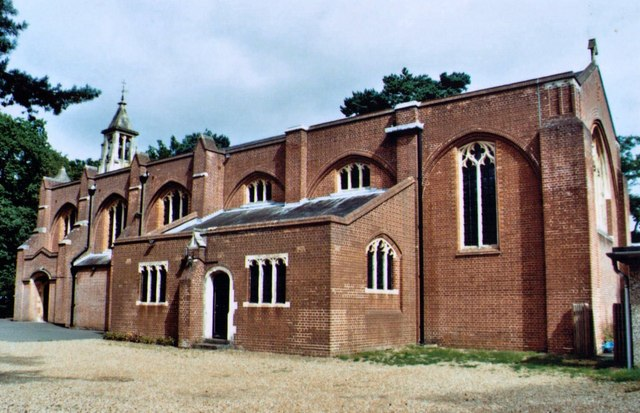
- St Michael & All Angels Church, Bassett Avenue, Southampton

- Shown within Southampton
- 50.94465°N 1.40531°W
- OS grid reference: SU 41874 16301
- Location: Bassett, Southampton
- Country: England
- Denomination: Anglican
- Website: nsab.org.uk

History
- Status: Parish church
- Founded: 1897
- Dedication: St. Michael
- Dedicated: 1897

Architecture
- Functional status: Active
- Heritage designation: Listed building - Grade II
- Designated: 14 December 1969
- Architect: Edward Prioleau Warren
- Architectural type: Church
- Groundbreaking: 29 September 1897
- Completed: May 1910
- Construction cost: £4,139

Specifications
- Materials: Brick with stone dressings

Administration
- Province: Canterbury
- Diocese: Winchester
- Archdeaconry: Bournemouth
- Deanery: Southampton
- Parish: North Stoneham and Bassett

Clergy
- Bishop: Bishop of Southampton
- Rector: In vacancy

St. Michael and All Angels Church, in Bassett, Southampton, is an Anglican parish church which dates from the late 19th century.

== Location ==
The church is situated on the eastern side of Bassett Avenue, Southampton, described by Pevsner & Lloyd as "part of the splendid tree-lined route into Southampton from Winchester, London and the north".

The church is in the parish of North Stoneham and Bassett and has the largest congregation of the three churches in the parish.

== Architecture ==
=== Exterior ===
The church exterior, in plain red stock brick with Monks Park stone dressings for the doors and windows, slated roof and small bell-turret on its western gable, is not particularly impressive; but with its concrete vaulted roof supported on stone ribs, Pevsner and Lloyd, in their Buildings of England: Hampshire and the Isle of Wight, considered that it has "an intriguing and distinguished design internally".

=== Interior ===
The church has a nave with four broad rib-vaulted bays separated from the chancel by a rood-screen surmounted by a carving depicting the Crucifixion of Jesus.

The east window, depicting Christ, flanked by the archangels Michael and Gabriel, was the first stained-glass window by Frank O. Salisbury.

The west window was given in 1962, by Hector Young an ex-mayor of Southampton, in memory of his wife Ethel who was killed in the Blitz in September 1940. The window, showing the Archangel Michael defeating Satan, was designed by Francis Skeat.

== History ==
=== Parish ===
The original parish of North Stoneham can be traced back to the early ninth century when it was known as "Stonam Abbatis" or "Abbots Stoneham" and was attached to Hyde Abbey at Winchester. At this time, the parish extended from the River Itchen in the east towards Chilworth and Bassett Green in the west with its neighbouring parish, South Stoneham, to the south and east. After the dissolution of the monasteries in the 1540s, the manor was acquired by Thomas Wriothesley, Earl of Southampton. In 1599, the Wriothesley family sold the estate to Sir Thomas Fleming, whose descendants held the advowson until 1997. Until the late nineteenth century, Bassett was part of the parish of North Stoneham, with the rector of St. Nicolas' Church serving the needs of the entire parish. Revd. Elliott Kenworthy-Browne, the rector of North Stoneham from 1886 to 1912, would often walk over 10 miles a day to meet the needs of his parishioners.

By the mid-1880s, Bassett had grown with many substantial villas occupied by the middle classes; despite having the appearance of a well-to-do suburb of Southampton, Revd. Kenworthy-Browne observed that three-quarters of the population of 800 were poor, chiefly mechanics and labourers.

The parish has since been renamed North Stoneham and Bassett, and encompasses North Stoneham, the whole of Bassett, the portion of Bassett Green north of Bassett Green Road, and the portion of Chilworth within the M3/M27 triangle. The parish also covers Southampton Airport.

=== Church ===
When Mr. Kenworthy-Browne came to North Stoneham in 1886, mission services were held in a small coach-house close to the Redhill brickyards. Later, in 1888, a mission room in Winchester Road was opened.

A legacy in the will of John Brown Willis Fleming of Stoneham Park, left the plot of land on Bassett Avenue on which the new church was to be built. The new church was designed by Edward Prioleau Warren, with the foundation stone being laid by Violet Fleming on 29 September 1897. The church was built in two stages as the money ran out. Construction was completed in May 1910 by the contractors Messrs. Holloway Bros. of London, the total cost being £4,139. When completed, it was regarded as a quite outstanding example of its kind, and attracted visitors from as far away as America.

By 1934, the church needed to be extended to include an assembly room (currently used as the choir vestry). In 1937 a new altar with oak panelled reredos was added.

In 1962, the church was classified as Grade B status, but in December 1969 this was revised to "Grade II listed".

In 1980, work began on a £13,000 programme of re-roofing and protection of the brickwork from penetration by damp.

In 2011 the Victorian church pews were removed and replaced by a more flexible and comfortable system of chairs.

In October 2014 the church was placed on the Heritage at Risk Register. In his Autumn Statement that year the Chancellor announced a £15 million roofs scheme, “For the repair of roofs and rainwater goods on listed church buildings …… where roof and rainwater goods repairs are deemed to be urgent and necessary”. Under this scheme a grant of £90,000 was awarded in March 2015. The repair work was carried out during 2016 with completion in October 2016.

=== Clergy ===
The parish rector at the time of the consecration of St. Michael's in 1911 was Elliot Kenworthy-Browne. The current Rector, the Reverend Sheena Williams, was invested by the Bishop of Southampton, the Right Reverend Dr. Jonathan Frost, on 3 February 2017. Rev'd Williams grew up in Linlithgow, near Edinburgh. She gained a law degree from the University of Aberdeen and Pierre Mendès-France University in France. After feeling a call to ordained ministry she trained at STETS (Southern Theological Education and Training Scheme) in Salisbury before ordination in 2010. She served her title in the parish of Swaythling, Southampton, before becoming associate priest in the parish of Chandlers Ford. She is assisted by an Associate Pioneer Minister, a curate, two honorary assistant clergy and two licensed lay ministers. Together, they share the ministry to the three churches of the Parish: St. Michael and All Angels, St. Nicolas and All Saints.

==== Rectors ====
- 1248 Geoffrey de Ferringes
- 1266 William of Monmouth
- 1284 Walter le Fleming
- 1285 W of Hambledon
- 1325 Robert of Worcester
- 1334 John Pyncebek
- 1349 Robert of Kelleseye
- 1349 John of Tudeworth
- 1361 Walter Gourda
- 1378 Thomas Marnham
- 1383 Thomas Evesham
- 1387 Thomas Chadworth
- ? Edward Blenkinsop
- 1439 Thomas Forest
- 1463 Walter Hoggis
- 1488 Unknown
- 1499 Walter Piers
- 1513 John Piers
- 1521 Thomas Erlysman
- 1532 William Capon
- 1551 Roland Swynbourne
- 1556 Sir Thomas Newenham
- 1558 Thomas Securis
- 1559 Henry Hide
- 1593 Lewis Alcock
- 1647 John Howell
- 1670 George Reynolds
- 1670 William Perkins
- 1672 Thomas Holdsworth
- 1714 William Whitear
- 1723 Timothy Owen
- 1749 Henry Fuller
- 1763 Edward Beadon
- 1811 Frederick Beadon
- 1879 Arthur Buchanan Willis Fleming
- 1886 Elliot Kenworthy-Browne
- 1912 Thomas Salmon
- 1932 Charles Philip Stewart Clarke
- 1935 Harold Gordon Peile
- 1946 John Robert Shuckburgh Stranack
- 1952 William Frederick Shail
- 1969 Ralph Edward Pearce Serocold
- 1975 Robert Bernard Jones
- 1990 Charles Taylor
- 1995 John Owen
- 2010 Stephen Holmes (Priest-in-Charge)
- 2017 Sheena Williams

== Worship & music ==
St. Michael and All Angel's Church has a middle-to-high, strongly Eucharistic style of worship. Sunday services are at 8am (BCP Holy Communion) and 10am (CW Sung Eucharist), with Choral Evensong on the 2nd & 4th Sundays at 6.30pm. There is a midweek Eucharist at 9.30am on Thursdays and a Taize Service on the last Friday of the month (except August & December) at 6.30pm.

=== Choir ===
St. Michael's has long enjoyed a strong choral tradition, which continues to the present day. The main choir is the all-age Senior Choir which sings the standard 'cathedral repertoire'. It supports the worship at the Sunday morning Eucharist and sings Choral Evensong twice a month. The choir regularly sings at both Winchester Cathedral and Chichester Cathedral to cover whilst the respective cathedral choirs are on holiday. It also travels further afield each August for a longer residence at a cathedral.

The church also has a Junior Choir which joins the Senior Choir at two services each month.

=== Organ ===
The organ was built by Rushworth and Dreaper in 1937, and is a fine example of a four rank extension instrument. It is totally enclosed in two expression chambers on the north side of the choir. The organ's four ranks consist of an open diapason (A), lieblich gedackt (B), salicional (C) and trumpet (D), which are used to create 25 speaking stops over two manuals and pedals. Ranks A&B (largely used on the great) are within one of the enclosed boxes, and ranks C&D (largely used by the swell) are within the second box. The specification can be found on the National Pipe Organ Register. The organ was refurbished in 2011 by Griffiths & Co (Organ Builders) Ltd.
