= Augustine David Crake =

English cleric and author

Augustine David Crake (1836–1890) was an English cleric and author, known for devotional works, and for juvenile historical fiction that has been compared to the books of John Mason Neale.

== Life ==
The eldest son of Jesse Crake, he was born on 1 October 1836 at Chalgrove, Oxfordshire, where his father kept a middle-class school. Leaving the Calvinism in which he had been brought up, he was baptised into the Church of England in 1858. Working as a teacher, he took a degree at London University (matriculated 1862, B.A. 1864).

Crake was ordained deacon by Bishop Samuel Wilberforce in 1865, and was appointed second master and chaplain of the Church of England middle-class school of All Saints', Bloxham, near Banbury, a position which he kept from 1865 to 1878. He was senior curate of St. Michael's, Swanmore on the Isle of Wight, 1878–9, and vicar of St. Peter's, Havenstreet from 1879 to 1885, when he made an exchange and became vicar of Cholsey, near Wallingford. He was chaplain at Moulsford Asylum, 1885–6.

At Cholsey, Crake was beginning to gather some pupils round him for tuition, but he died on 18 January 1890, at the age of 53. He was buried in Cholsey graveyard on 23 January, when many of his former Bloxham pupils followed his remains to the grave.

== Works ==
Crake was the author of a long series of historical fiction works, about the church in Britain, using Oxfordshire and Berkshire settings; they were based on stories he had told at Bloxham school. In 1873, he published a popular History of the Church under the Roman Empire. His major devotional books and stories were:

- Simple Prayers for School Boys, Oxford, 1867, 1870.
- The Bread of Life, Oxford, 1868; 4th ed. 1872.
- Simple Prayers, 1870.
- Aemilius: a Tale of the Decian and Valerian Persecutions, 1871.
- Evanus: a Tale of the Days of Constantine the Great, 1872, 1885.
- The Garden of Life (a devotional primer), Oxford, 1873.
- Edwy the Fair; or, the First Chronicle of Aescendune, 1874; 5th ed. 1885.
- Alfgar the Dane (a sequel to Edwy), 1874.
- The Camp on the Severn, 1875.
- The Andreds-Weald (a tale of the Norman Conquest), 1877.
- The Rival Heirs, 1882.
- Fairleigh Hall (English Civil War in Oxfordshire), 1882.
- The Last Abbot of Glastonbury, 1884.
- The Victor's Laurel, 1885.
- The Doomed City (the time of St. Augustine), 1885.
- The House of Walderne, 1886.
- Brian FitzCount, a Story of Wallingford Castle, 1887.
- Yule Log Stories, 1887.
- Stories from Old English History, 1887.
- The Heir of Treherne.

Crake edited Offices for the Hours of Prime, Sext, and Compline; with special Antiphons and Chapters for the Seasons of the Church, Oxford, 1871. Crake was moreover joint-editor with Joseph Oldknow of the Priest's Book of Private Devotion (Oxford, 1872, and later editions).

== Family ==
Crake married in 1879 Annie, daughter of John Lucas of the Radcliffe Observatory.

== Notes ==
Attribution

- This article incorporates text from a publication now in the public domain: Lee, Sidney, ed. (1901). "Crake, Augustine David". Dictionary of National Biography (1st supplement). Vol. 2. London: Smith, Elder & Co.
