= Bassett, Southampton =

Suburb of Southampton, England

Coordinates: 50.935°N 1.415°W

Bassett
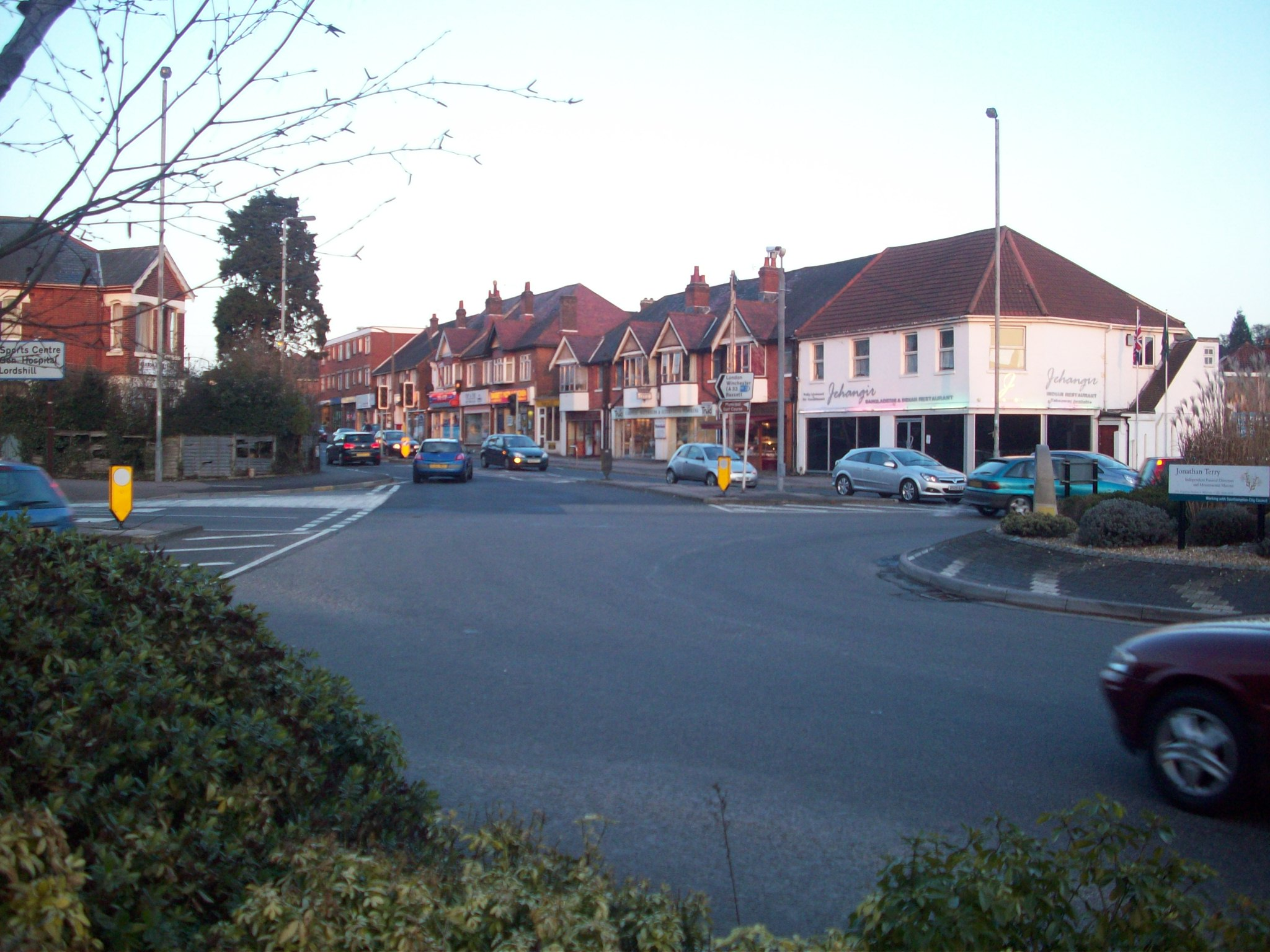
- Bassett's neighbourhood shops on Winchester Road

- Location within Southampton
- Area: 4.53 km^{2} (1.75 sq mi)
- Population: 14,532 (2001 & 2011 Census.Ward)
  - Density: 3,208/km^{2} (8,310/sq mi)
- Unitary authority: Southampton
- Ceremonial county: Hampshire
- Region: South East
- Country: England
- Sovereign state: United Kingdom
- Post town: SOUTHAMPTON
- Postcode district: SO15
- Dialling code: 023
- Police: Hampshire and Isle of Wight
- Fire: Hampshire and Isle of Wight
- Ambulance: South Central
- UK Parliament: Romsey and Southampton North

Bassett is a suburb and electoral ward of the City of Southampton, England. The suburb lies to the north of the city centre and gives its name to part of the A33 arterial road which links the city centre to the M3, described by Pevsner & Lloyd as "part of the splendid tree-lined route into Southampton from Winchester, London and the north". The highest point in the City of Southampton (its "county top") lies on Bassett Avenue at a height of 82 metres (269 ft) above sea level.

Bassett Ward comprises Bassett, Bassett Green and Lordswood. It had a population of 14,532 at the 2011 census.

== History ==
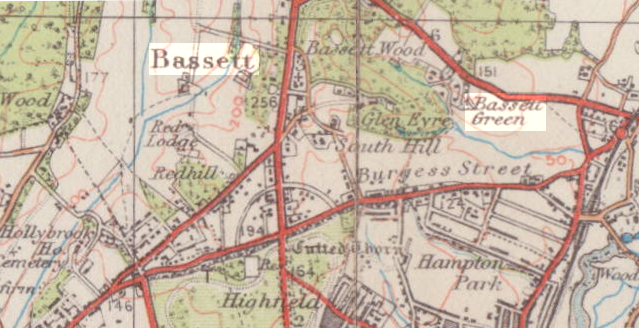
Ordnance Survey map of 1935 showing locations of Bassett and Bassett Green.

A family named 'Basset' is known to have lived in South Stoneham in the 15th century, and the place name may be from their name. The area broadly occupied by Bassett today was known as Stoneham Common, shown on the 1791 map by Thomas Milne on which 'Bassets Lane' also appears (without any associated village). The village of Bassett appears on an 1810 map, located roughly where Bassett Green Village is today. In the late 18th century it grew as a retreat for rich people outside (and away from civic responsibilities in) the borough of Southampton. By the time of the Ordnance Survey of 1897, Basset had been renamed Bassett Green (with a double 't'), and a more westerly area (west of Bassett Wood) was identified as Bassett.

By the late 19th century, Bassett consisted of many substantial villas occupied by the middle classes. Despite having the appearance of a well-to-do district on the edge of the town, Revd. Elliott Kenworthy-Browne (rector of North Stoneham from 1886 to 1912) observed that three-quarters of the population of 800 were poor, chiefly mechanics and labourers.

In 1920 the boundaries of Southampton were extended to include Bassett, along with Bitterne, Sholing, Woolston, Weston, Peartree and Swaythling.

== Government ==
Along with the adjacent neighbourhoods of Bassett Green and Lordswood, Bassett forms part of the Bassett Ward of Southampton, which had a population of 13,139 at the 2001 census. Councillors for the ward are elected to Southampton City Council, which is a unitary authority and therefore the only tier of local government covering the neighbourhood. Nationally, Bassett falls within the Romsey and Southampton North constituency for the UK parliament. Prior to Brexit in 2020, it was represented by the South East England constituency for the European Union parliament.

== Geography ==
Bassett is primarily urban or suburban in nature but is sandwiched between Southampton's two largest open spaces; Southampton Common to the south and Southampton Sports Centre to the north. The main shopping area of the neighbourhood is located where three major roads meet; Hill Lane (the main road from Bassett to the city centre), Winchester Road and Burgess Road (both major east–west routes across the city). The shops there include a well-established pharmacy, a cycle shop, and a butcher, Uptons of Bassett. Uptons frequently appears in regional and national butchery competitions; in 2014 they were named supreme champions in the Great Hampshire Sausage & Pie Competition.

== Landmarks ==
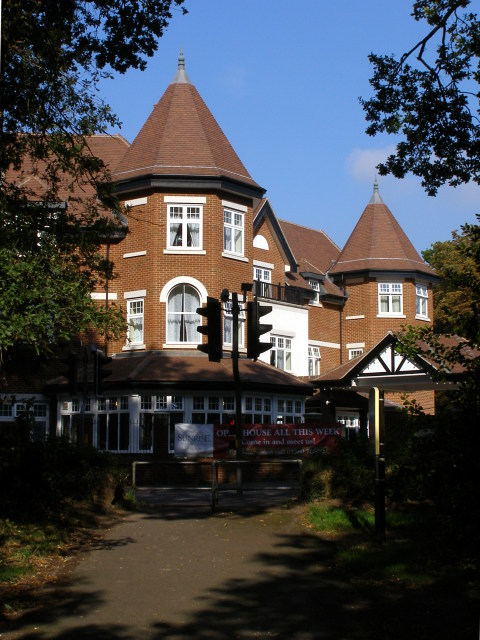
This residential care home stands on the site of the Bassett Hotel

The Bassett Hotel at 111 Burgess Road dated from before 1871 and was by that year owned by Coopers Brewery, subsequently taken over by Watney Combe & Reid. It became a popular music venue, with its back room housing a jazz club, the Concorde Club, which subsequently moved to separate premises in North Stoneham. While located at the Bassett Hotel, the club was the scene of early performances from the likes of Chris Barber, Joe Cocker and Manfred Mann. The hotel's bar was also visited by Ken Russell on his way to an infamous television interview for the Viewpoint programme; after drinking at least four scotches at the Bassett, Russell initially went to the wrong television studio and when he reached the correct one he failed to answer any questions.

The hotel underwent an £80,000 refurbishment in 1972 and was relaunched as a Berni Steak House. It was later sold to Whitbread who turned it into a Beefeater restaurant and subsequently a Brewers Fayre before it was closed. The hotel was acquired by Sunrise Senior Living who demolished it and built a residential care home on the site.

In 1962 the 14 story Brampton tower was built in Bassett.

== Education ==
Primary-age children in Bassett tend to attend local schools in adjacent neighbourhoods, such as Bassett Green, Shirley and Lordswood. Bassett is also close to two large secondary schools; Cantell School in Bassett Green and Regents Park Community College are roughly equidistant from the focal point of Bassett (the junction of Hill Lane and Winchester Road).

The University of Southampton's distinctive Boldrewood Campus buildings are situated just off Bassett Avenue, at the eastern extremity of Bassett. The campus housed the Biomedical Sciences Centre until its closure in 2010. It has now been replaced by a joint centre for the University of Southampton and Lloyd's Register, completed in 2014.

== Religious sites ==
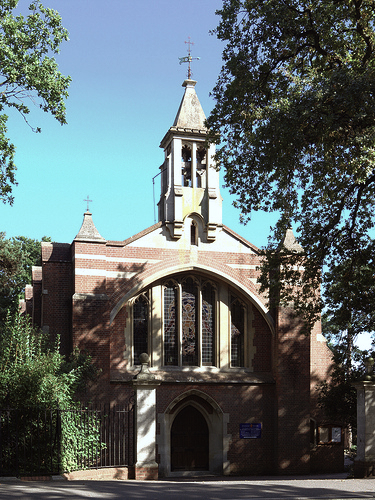
St. Michael & All Angels Church, Bassett

Bassett was originally part of the parish of North Stoneham, which can be traced back to the early 9th century when it was known as "Stonam Abbatis" or "Abbots Stoneham", and was attached to Hyde Abbey at Winchester. After the dissolution of the monasteries in the 1540s, the manor was acquired by Thomas Wriothesley, Earl of Southampton. In 1599, the Wriothesley family sold the estate to Sir Thomas Fleming.

With the growth of Bassett came the construction of a second church within the parish, located on Bassett Avenue. The foundation stone for the new church was laid in 1897 and St Michael and All Angels Church is now a "Grade II listed building". The parish has since been renamed "North Stoneham and Bassett", and encompasses the whole of Bassett, the portion of Bassett Green north of Bassett Green Road, North Stoneham, and the portion of Chilworth within the M3/M27 triangle. The parish also covers Southampton Airport.

All Saints Church on Winchester Road was inaugurated in 1970 to serve the needs of the western edge of the parish.

== Sport ==
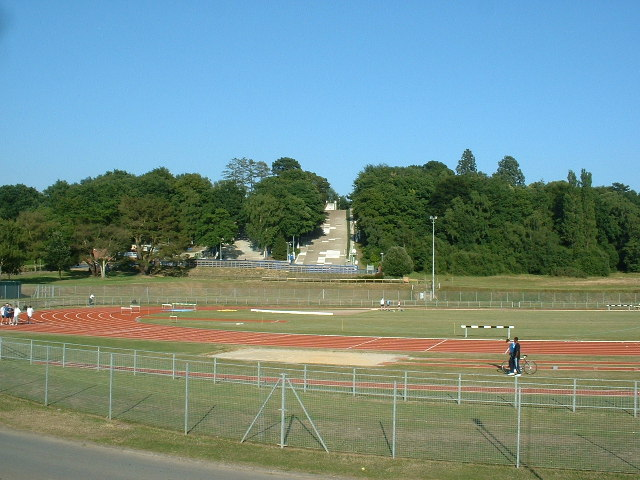
Southampton Sports Centre (with the Snowsports Centres visible at the rear)

Bassett is home to several of Southampton's main sports facilities:

=== Southampton Sports Centre ===
The centre is a 150-acre site with facilities for football, netball, cricket, cyclo cross, cross country, athletics, tennis, bowling, volleyball, crazy golf, putting, and hockey. The area has been used for the Millennium Youth Games, National Cyclocross Championships and to hold outdoor classical concerts.

=== Southampton Snowsports Centre ===
The centre has three dry ski slopes: a main slope of 110 metres; a second slope of 90 metres and a nursery slope of 30 metres long. All slopes are fully floodlit.

=== Southampton City Golf Course ===
Originally known as Southampton Municipal Golf Course or 'Muni', the course is a 27-hole venue set in woodland. The course was designed by five times British Open Champion J. H. Taylor, and was completed in 1935. It recently celebrated its 75th anniversary in 2010.

=== Red Lodge Community Pool ===
Bassett has its own 20-metre swimming pool. Red Lodge Community Pool was threatened with demolition in 1999 and is now run by a charitable trust. The pool offers swimming lessons, community group bookings and public sessions.

== Notable people ==
Former Prime Minister Rishi Sunak worked in the pharmacy owned by his mother, previously called Sunak Pharmacy and since renamed Bassett Pharmacy, on Burgess Road in Bassett. The business was still operating but no longer owned by the family as of 2022.
