= Chipperfield (disambiguation) =

Chipperfield is a village and civil parish in England.

Chipperfield may also refer to:

- Chipperfield, Saskatchewan a hamlet in Saskatchewan, Canada

== People with the surname ==
- Arthur Chipperfield, Australian cricketer
- David Alan Chipperfield, British architect
- Jimmy Chipperfield, English footballer
- Mary Chipperfield, circus entertainer
- Ron Chipperfield, Canadian former professional ice hockey player
- Scott Chipperfield, Australian international football (soccer) player
- Sheila Chipperfield, bassist in Elastica

== See also ==
- Chipperfield's Circus, an English family show
