= Richard Cockle Lucas =

British sculptor and photographer (1800–1883)

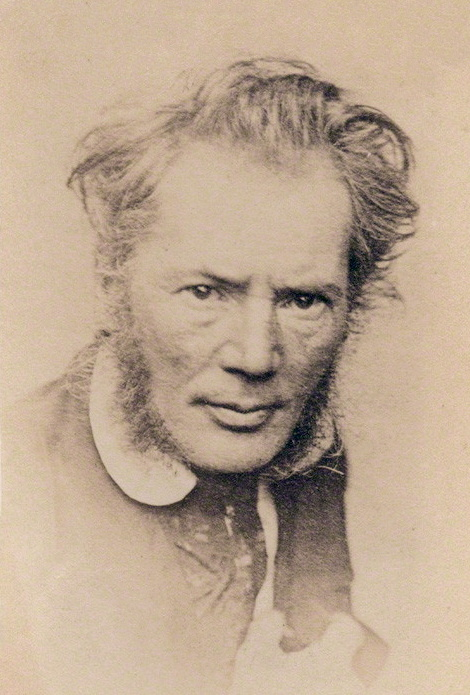
- Self-portrait, circa 1858
- Born: 24 October 1800; Salisbury, Wiltshire
- Died: 18 May 1883 (aged 82); Chilworth, Hampshire
- Known for: Sculptor, photographer
- Spouse: Eliza
- Children: Albert Dürer Lucas

Richard Cockle Lucas (24 October 1800 – 18 May 1883) was a British sculptor and photographer.

== Career ==
Lucas was born in Salisbury, Wiltshire, the son of Richard Lucas and his wife, Martha Sutton (who died shortly after childbirth).

At the age of twelve, he was apprenticed to an uncle who was a cutler at Winchester, where his ability at carving knife handles revealed his skill as a sculptor. He moved to London, aged 21, and studied at the Royal Academy Schools. From 1828, he was a regular contributor to the Royal Academy, receiving silver medals for architectural drawing in 1828 and 1829.

His son, Albert Dürer, was born in 1828 in Bayswater and by 1846 the family was living at Nottingham Place in central London. In 1849, the family moved out of London, probably for health reasons, to Otterbourne, near Winchester, where Lucas may have become a friend of the Victorian children's author, Charlotte Mary Yonge.

Lucas then moved to Chilworth near Romsey in about 1854 where he had the "Tower of the Winds" built to his own design. This house stood opposite the former "Clump Inn". In 1865, he built a second home, "Chilworth Tower", about half a mile from the first.

By this time, Lucas had become very eccentric, believing in fairies, and rode around Southampton in a Roman chariot.

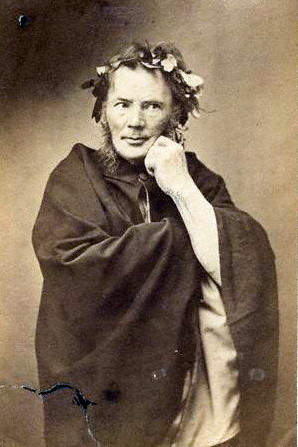
Lucas posing as a "Roman" in a self-portrait c. 1858

Lucas exhibited over a hundred works at the Royal Academy, the British Institution and at the Suffolk Street Gallery of the Society of British Artists; these included busts, medallions and classical subjects. Amongst his statuary are those of Samuel Johnson at Lichfield, Isaac Watts at Southampton and Richard Colt Hoare at Salisbury Cathedral. According to the Oxford Dictionary of National Biography, "such large works were ill suited to his powers". His marble, wax, and ivory medallion portraits were more successful, however; many were displayed at the Great Exhibition and several were subsequently purchased by the National Portrait Gallery. Amongst his works on display at Bodelwyddan Castle are wax medallions of Sir Frederic Madden, Thomas Garnier, Anthony Panizzi and Henry Hallam. Two self-portraits, an etching dated on the plate 1858, and a plaster cast of a bust, incised and dated 1868, are also in the National Portrait Gallery collection.

Lucas's popular wax relief Leda and the Swan was acquired by the Victoria and Albert Museum. Another copy is held in the National Gallery, Berlin. The Victoria & Albert also has a bust of the London society hostess, Catherine, Lady Stepney, posing as Cleopatra.

Lucas was an enthusiastic student of the Elgin Marbles, of which he made two large wax models, the first showing the Parthenon as it appeared after bombardment by the Venetians in 1687; the other representing it restored in accordance with his own theories as to the original arrangement of the sculptures. The latter was exhibited in the Elgin room at the British Museum, where it became the subject of much public interest. In 1845 he published his Remarks on the Parthenon, illustrated with fifteen etchings.

Lucas produced many etchings depicting his own sculptural works, biblical stories, and scenes from eighteenth-century poetry. A nearly complete series of these, mounted in an album bound by Lucas himself, and including a frontispiece portrait of the artist, was held the British Museum. These albumen "cartes de visite" (now in the National Portrait Gallery) show Lucas in a variety of theatrical and expressive poses that further reveal his eccentricity.

Towards the end of his life, Lucas's conversational prowess ensured that he was a frequent guest at Broadlands, the seat of Lord Palmerston, who obtained for him a civil-list pension in June 1865. Lucas made three wax portraits of Palmerston, and a statuette which formed his last exhibit at the Royal Academy in 1859. In 1870 he published An Essay on Art.

== Death ==
Lucas died of paralysis at his home in Chilworth, on 18 May 1883, leaving a widow, Eliza (c.1805–1893), and a son, Albert Dürer Lucas (1828–1918).

Albert was a painter of still-life and flowers who had exhibited at the British Institution and with the Society of Artists between 1859 and 1874. His paintings are still regularly reproduced and sold at auction.

== The Flora bust ==
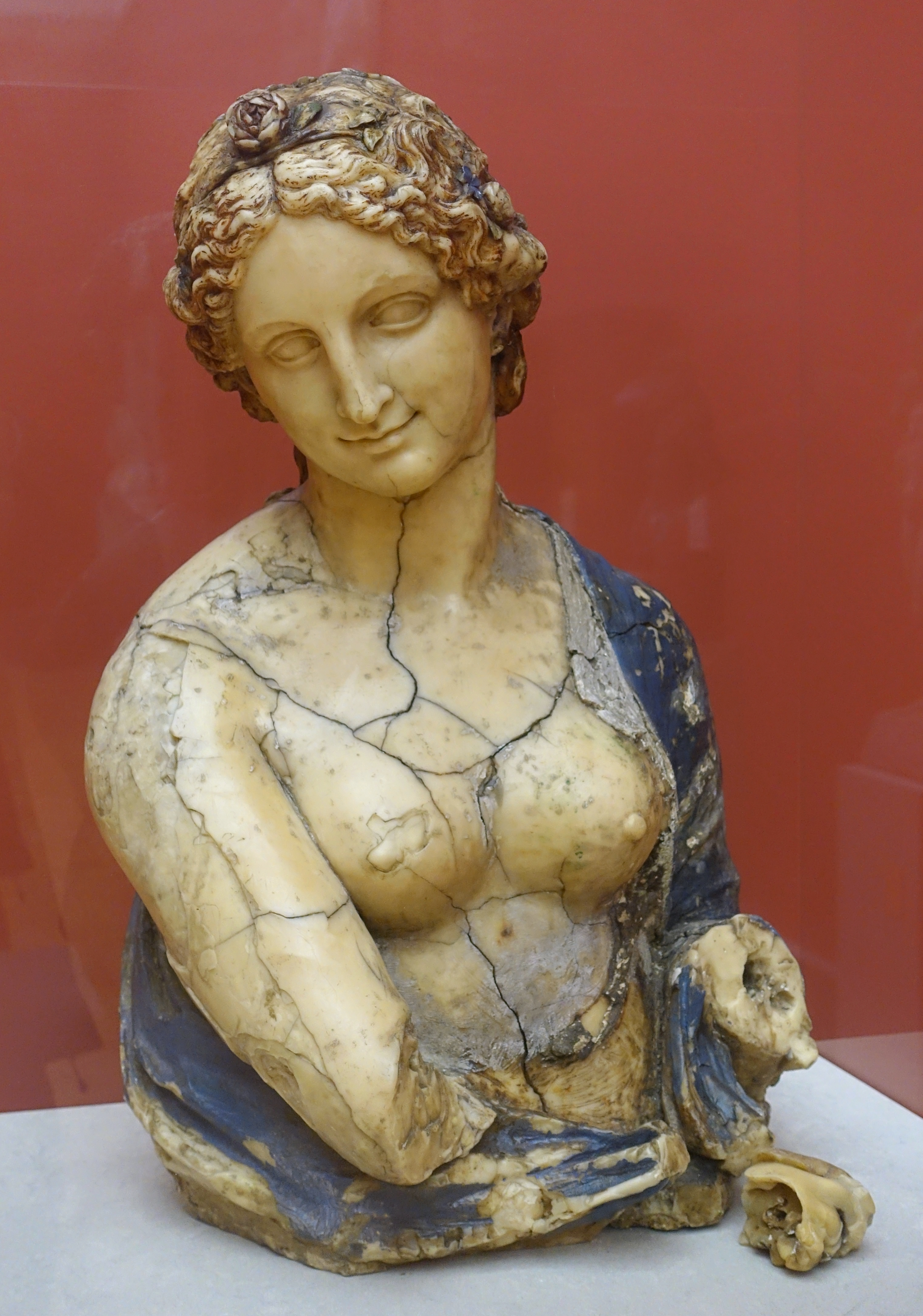
The Flora bust

Among the objects in the Bode's collection is a bust of Flora, which had been purchased by the Kaiser Friedrich Museum, Berlin, under the belief that it was by Leonardo da Vinci. Wilhelm von Bode, the general manager of the Prussian Art Collections for the Berlin Museum, had spotted the bust in a London gallery and purchased it for 160.000 Goldmark. Bode was convinced that the bust was by Leonardo, and the Berlin Museum authorities, and the German public, were delighted to have "snatched a great art treasure from under the very noses" of the British art world. However, in 1910, Albert Dürer Lucas – the son of Richard Cockle Lucas – claimed that the sculpture had been created by his father. Shortly thereafter, The Times ran an article claiming that the bust was the work of Lucas, who had been commissioned to produce it from a painting. Lucas's son Albert then came forward and swore under oath that the story was correct and that he had helped his father to make the sculpture. Albert was able to explain how the layers of wax had been built up from old candle ends; he also described how his father would stuff various debris, including newspapers, inside the bust. When the Berlin museum staff removed the base they found the debris, just as Albert had described it, including a letter dating from the 1840s.

Despite this evidence, Bode continued to claim that his original attribution was correct. To support this, he displayed the Flora bust among a selection of Lucas's other works but this exhibition backfired, as it showed that Lucas had been regularly making wax sculptures inspired by the great works of previous times. Hungarian-born London art critic and historian Paul George Konody, in particular, "waged war on Dr. Bode's claims through the columns of the London Daily Mail". Various claims and counter-claims have been put forward about the bust, from its being an outright forgery to being a genuine 16th-century piece (albeit not by Leonardo). In April 2021, the bust was dated using carbon-14, which confirmed that it was sculpted in the 19th century. The bust remains on display in what is now the Bode Museum labelled "England", "19th Century" with a question mark.

== Works ==
As well as items in museums and the large statuary, there are many works by Lucas in churches and other public places. These include:

- The Robert Pearce family grave in Southampton Old Cemetery. The sculpture depicts the figures of Faith, Hope and Charity, surmounted by a draped urn. The memorial is English Heritage Listed, Grade II.
- Wax relief of Thomas Burgess (1756–1837), Bishop of Salisbury. This is on display at the University of Wales, Lampeter.
- Portrait tablet to John Willis Fleming (1781–1844) in St. Nicolas' Church, North Stoneham, near Southampton.
- A recumbent effigy to Count Jerome de Salis-Soglio (1771–1836) in St. Mary's church, Harlington, West London.
- Statue of Richard Colt Hoare in Salisbury Cathedral (1841)
- Statue of Isaac Watts at Southampton (1858)

== See also ==
- Article on German Wikipedia "Wachsbüste der Flora (Wax bust of Flora)"

== Gallery ==
Monuments sculpted by Richard Cockle Lucas
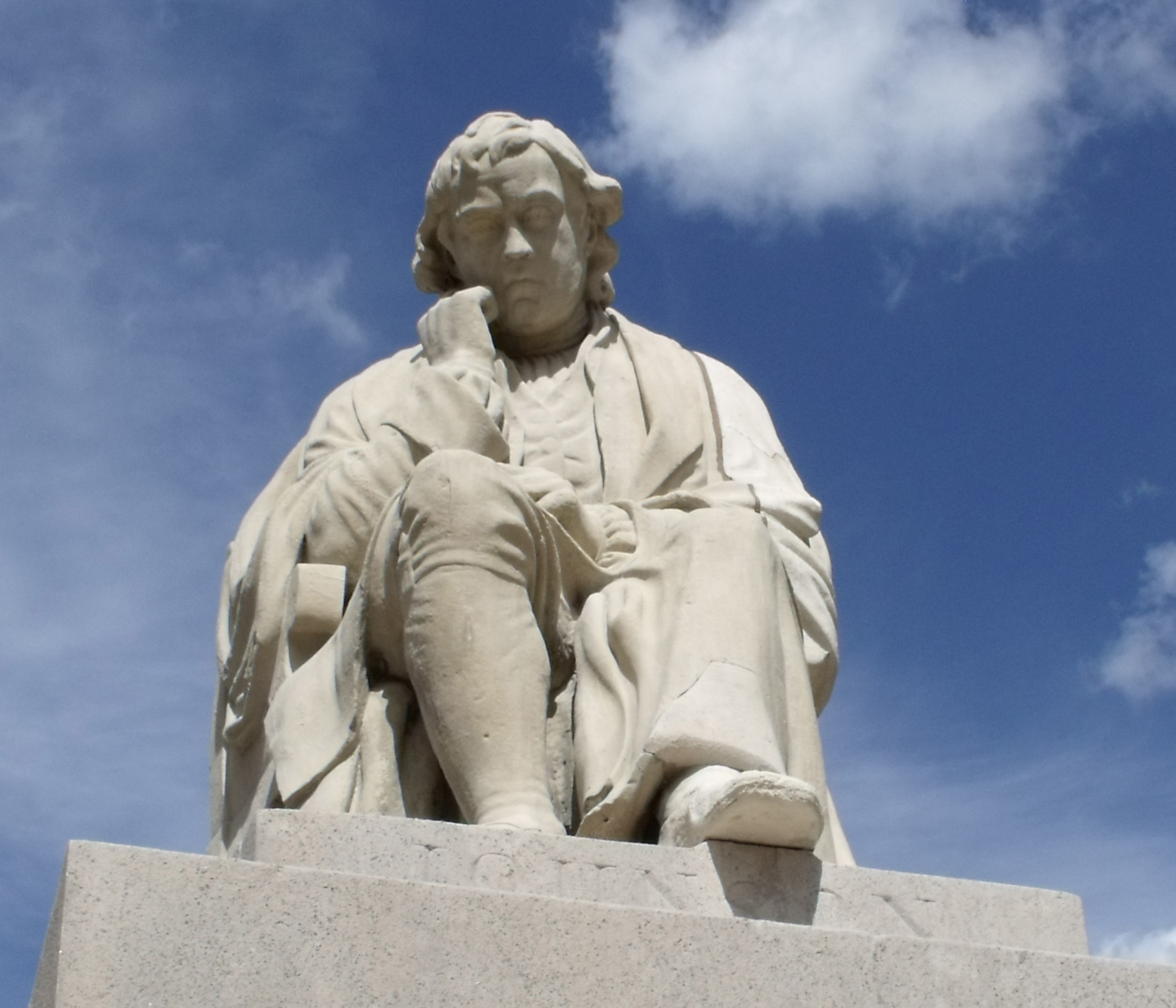
Statue of Dr. Samuel Johnson in Market Square, Lichfield

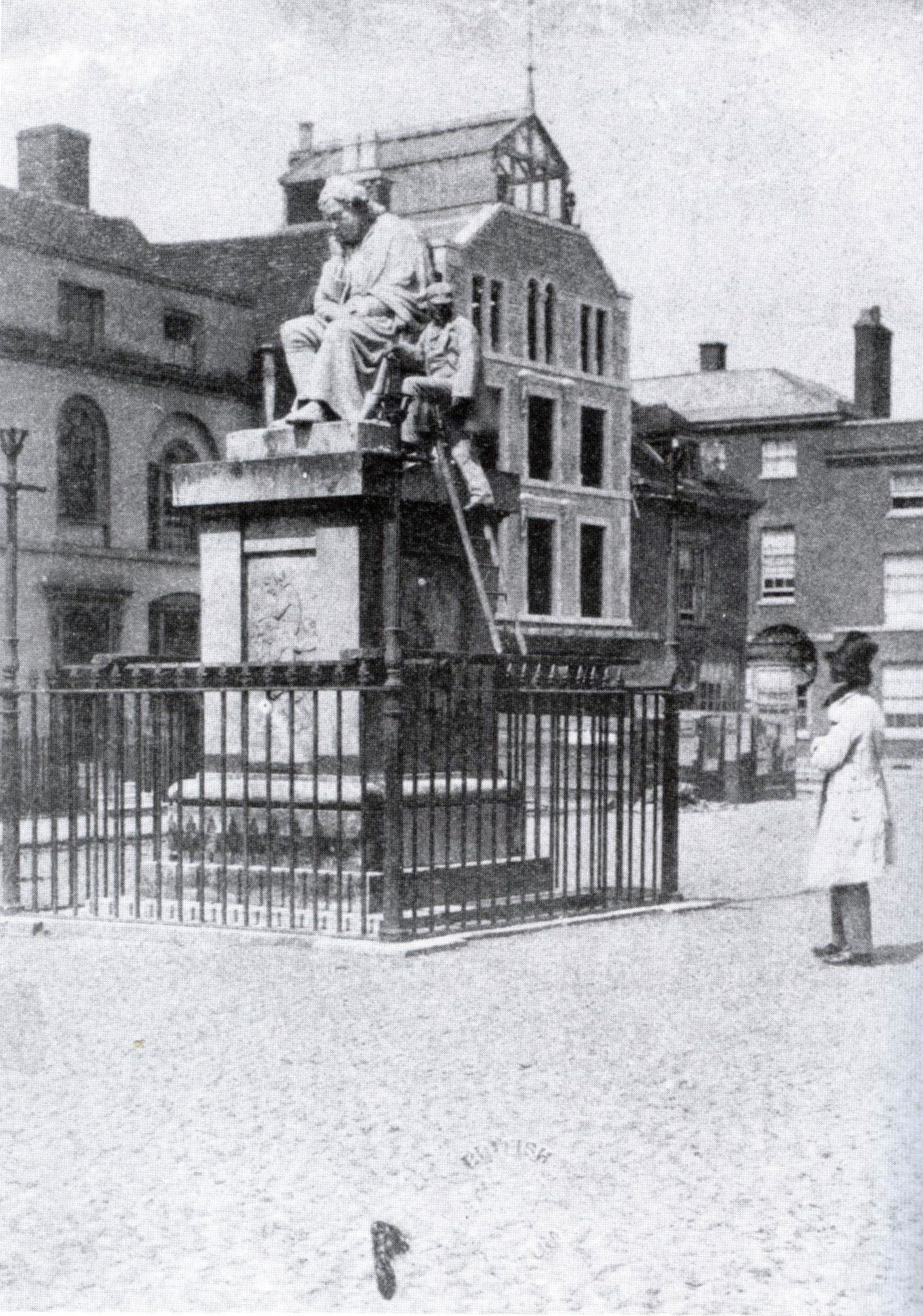
Photograph by Lucas of Johnson statue taken in 1859

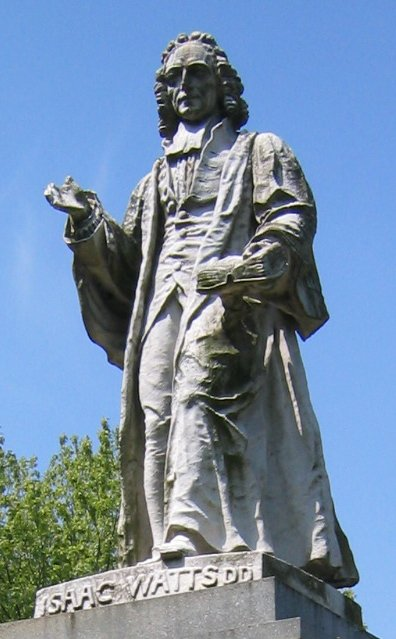
Statue of Isaac Watts in the West (Watts) Park in Southampton

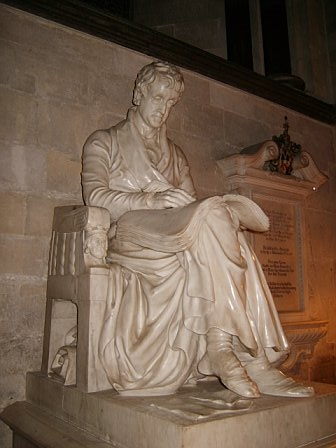
Monument to Sir Richard Colt Hoare in Salisbury Cathedral

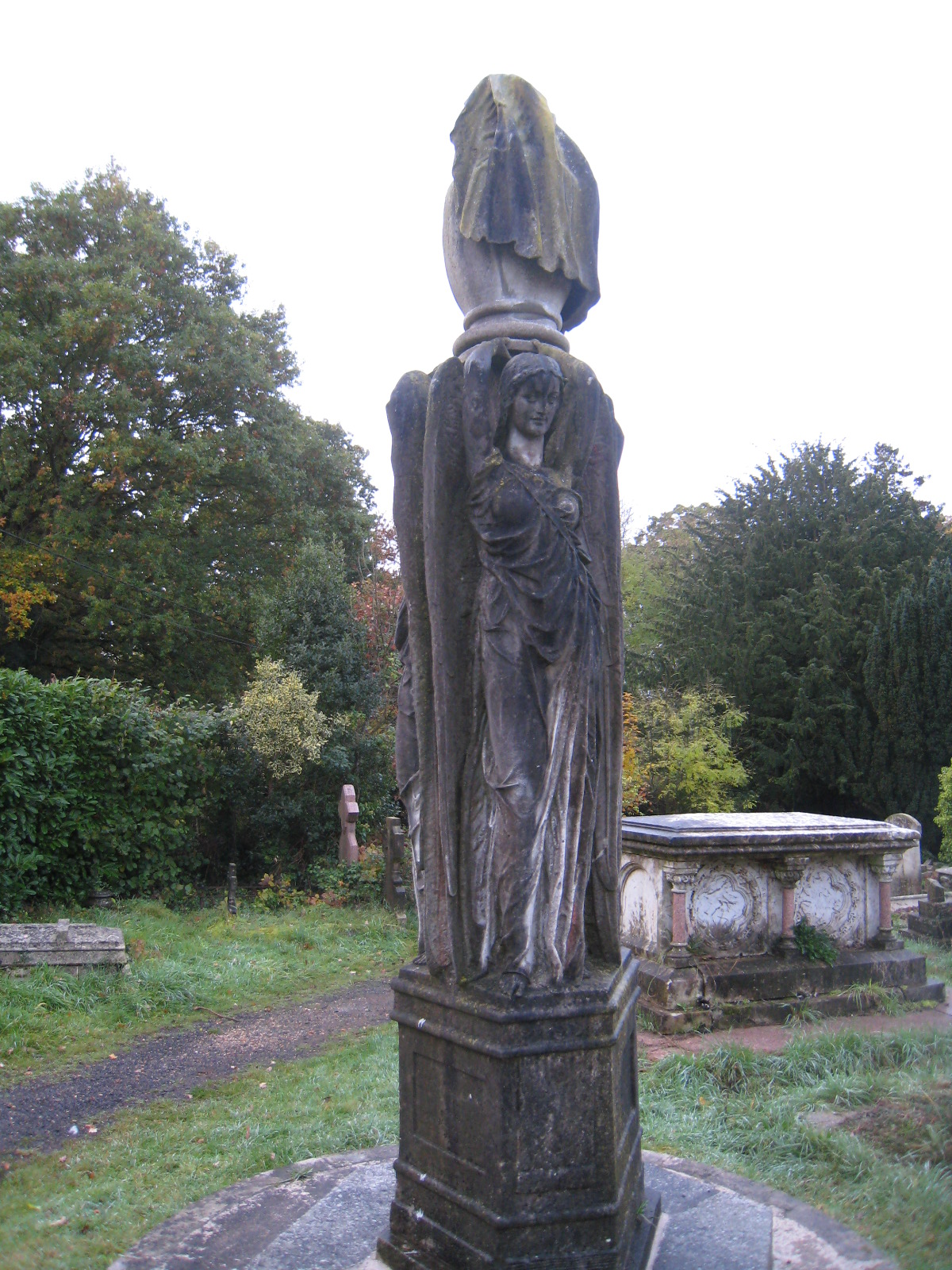
Pearce family grave in Southampton Old Cemetery

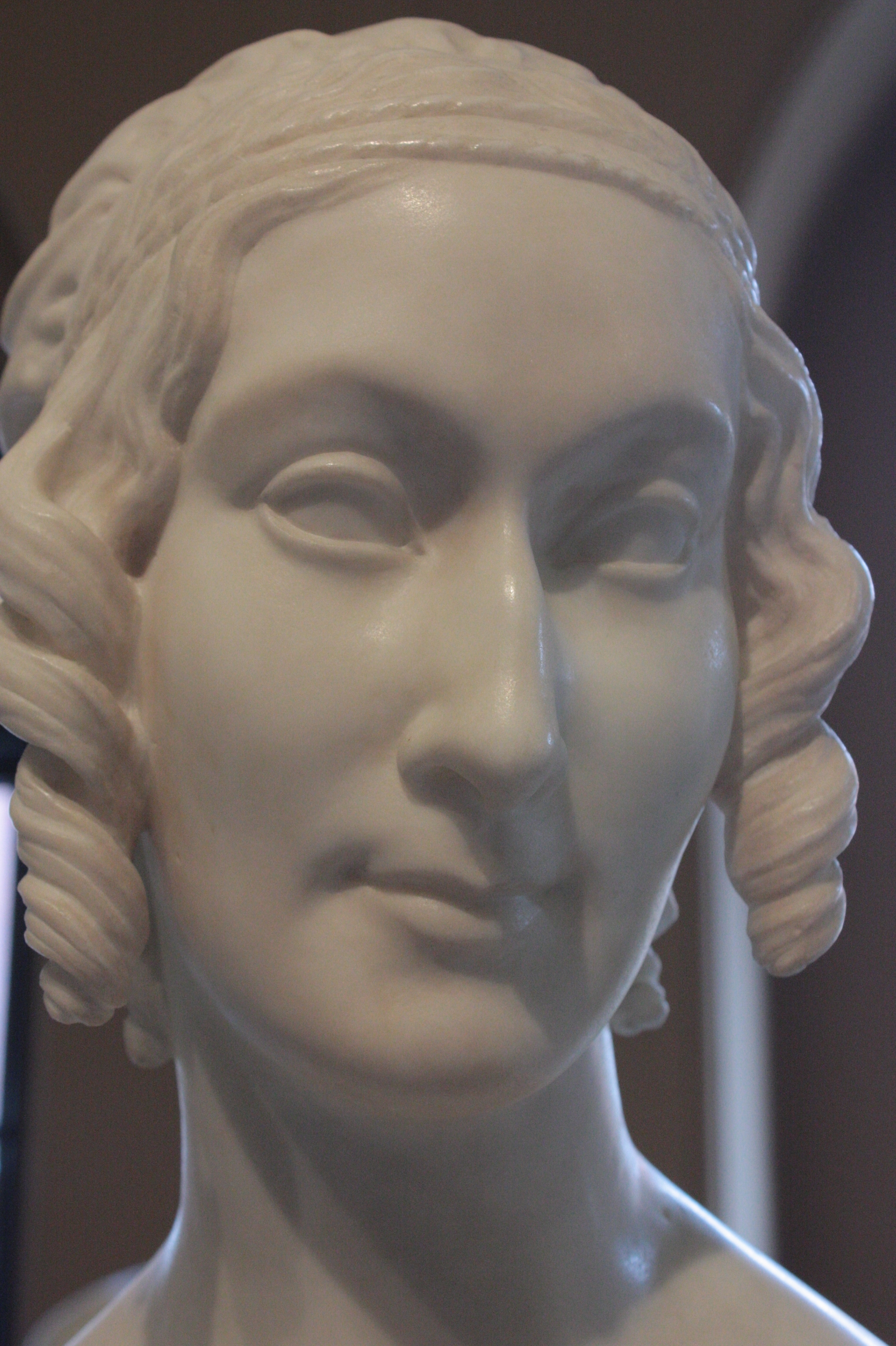
Catherine, Lady Stepney, Victoria and Albert Museum.
