= North Stoneham =

Village and parish in Hampshire, England

Coordinates: 50°57′18″N 1°22′54″W

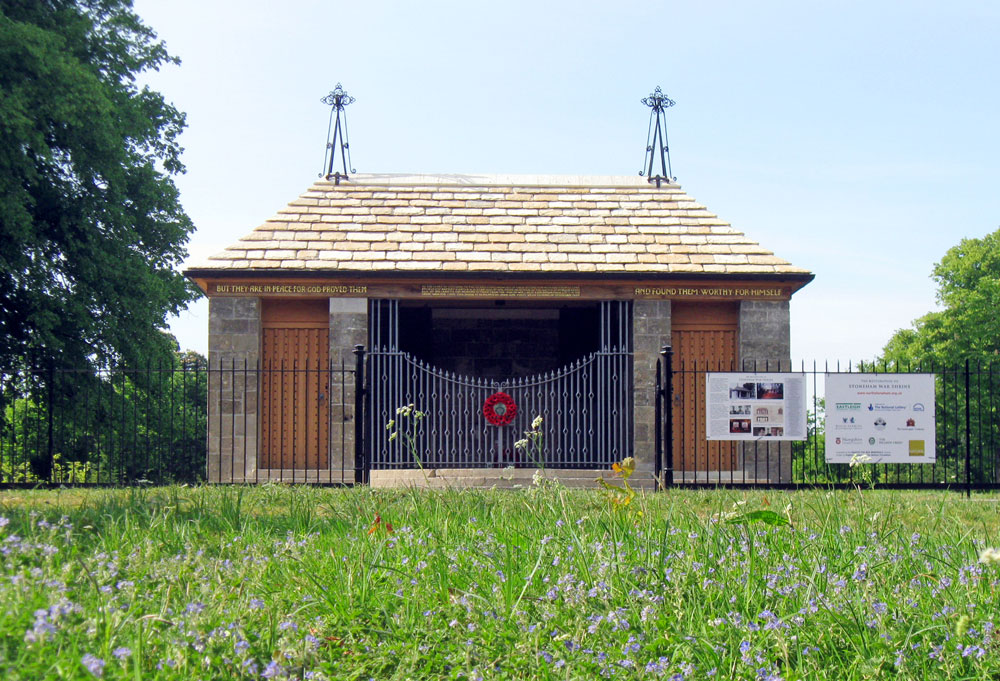
- The restored Stoneham War Shrine in 2011

- Location within Hampshire
- Civil parish: Eastleigh Town
- District: Eastleigh
- Shire county: Hampshire
- Region: South East
- Country: England
- Sovereign state: United Kingdom
- Post town: EASTLEIGH
- Postcode district: SO50
- Dialling code: 023
- Police: Hampshire and Isle of Wight
- Fire: Hampshire and Isle of Wight
- Ambulance: South Central

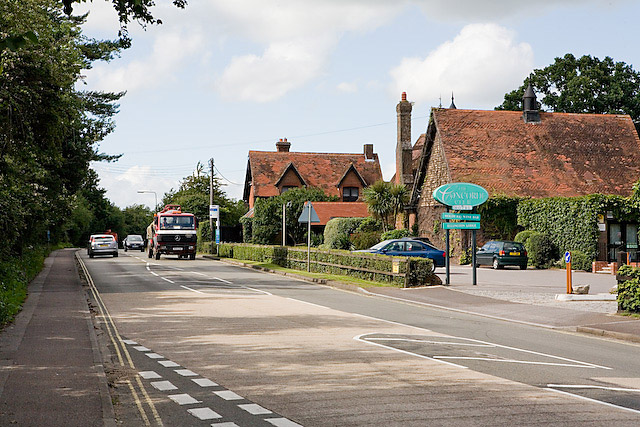
The Concorde Club, Stoneham Lane, Eastleigh.

North Stoneham is a settlement in the civil parish of Eastleigh Town, in the Eastleigh district, in the county of south Hampshire, England. Formerly an ancient estate, manor, and civil parish, It is between Eastleigh and Southampton. Until the nineteenth century, it was a rural community comprising a number of scattered hamlets, including Middle Stoneham, North End, and Bassett Green, and characterised by large areas of woodland.

Parts of the former 1,000-acre estate and manor house, North Stoneham Park, which was redesigned by Capability Brown in the eighteenth century, remain at Avenue Park to the north of the settlement. The church of St. Nicolas stands in Stoneham Lane, on the edge of the former park, while opposite is the former rectory, now an office complex. The aviation pioneer, Edwin Moon, selected the flat field at North Stoneham Farm for his first flight in 1910, on what is now Southampton Airport.

== History ==
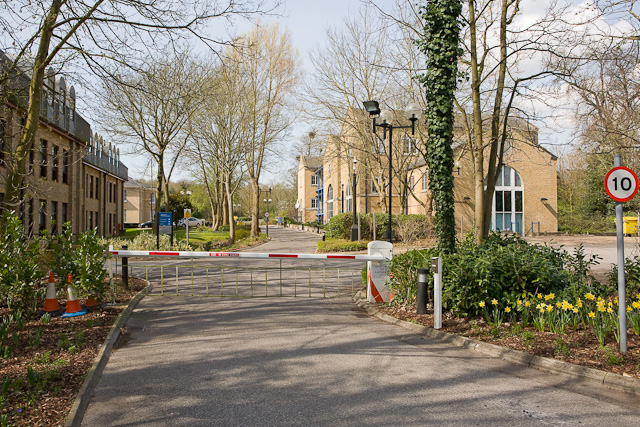
Stoneham Park office complex

North Stoneham can be traced back to the early 9th century when it was known as "Stonam Abbatis" or "Abbots Stoneham" and was a parish attached to Hyde Abbey at Winchester. At this time, it extended from the River Itchen in the east towards Chilworth and Bassett Green in the west with its neighbouring parish, South Stoneham, to the south and east. After the dissolution of the monasteries in the 1540s, the manor was acquired by Thomas Wriothesley, Earl of Southampton. In 1599, Henry Wriothesley, who had inherited the title and estate at the age of eight, sold the estate to Sir Thomas Fleming, and for some centuries his descendants, the Willis Fleming family, were lords of the manor of North Stoneham, and the principal landowners, until 1997.

Thomas Fleming built a new house on the estate. In the second half of the 1770s the estate's gardens were redesigned by Capability Brown. From 1818 a new house was commissioned on the estate by John Willis Fleming to a design by Thomas Hopper. Work continued until 1844 when Fleming died. The house was demolished around 1940. The stables survived to become housing.

North Stoneham did not develop into a village, though a few hamlets were built on the estate, including to the north the little hamlet of Middle, consisting of a farm and a few cottages, the Cricketer's Arms Inn and the post office. In the early 20th century, the parish covered approximately 5,000 acres (20 km^{2}; 8 sq mi) between the neighbouring towns of Southampton and Eastleigh.

Today, the parish is part of the combined parish of North Stoneham and Bassett, and St. Nicolas is one of three churches serving the parish, the others being St. Michael & All Angels, in Bassett Avenue, and All Saints in Winchester Road.

The aviation pioneer, Edwin Moon, selected the flat field at North Stoneham Farm for his first flight in 1910, on what is now Southampton Airport.

The Stoneham War Shrine was built in 1917–18 in memory of thirty-six local men killed in World War I. The Shrine was restored in 2011.

North Stoneham and neighbouring South Stoneham are together sometimes referred to as 'the Stonehams' but are situated in different modern-day local authority areas: North Stoneham is in the Borough of Eastleigh and South Stoneham is in the city of Southampton.

== Development plans ==
In the early 1990s, Southampton Football Club considered building a 25,000-seat stadium in the area to replace their stadium in the city, The Dell. However, by 1999 the plan had been abandoned in favour of a 32,000-seat stadium, St Mary's in the St Mary's area of Southampton, which opened in 2001. Following consultation with residents across the borough, North Stoneham was chosen as the preferred site for a new housing development, plans for which were put to the council in 2015. As well as 1,100 new homes, the plans for the £70m scheme include a new primary school, nursery, community centre, care home, shops and play facilities, to be built on a 62-hectare area of the former North Stoneham Park estate, which was landscaped by Lancelot "Capability" Brown.

== Civil parish ==
In 1931 the parish had a population of 700. On 1 April 1932 the parish was abolished and merged with Eastleigh and Chilworth.
