= Havenstreet =

Coordinates: 50.7092°N 1.2089°W

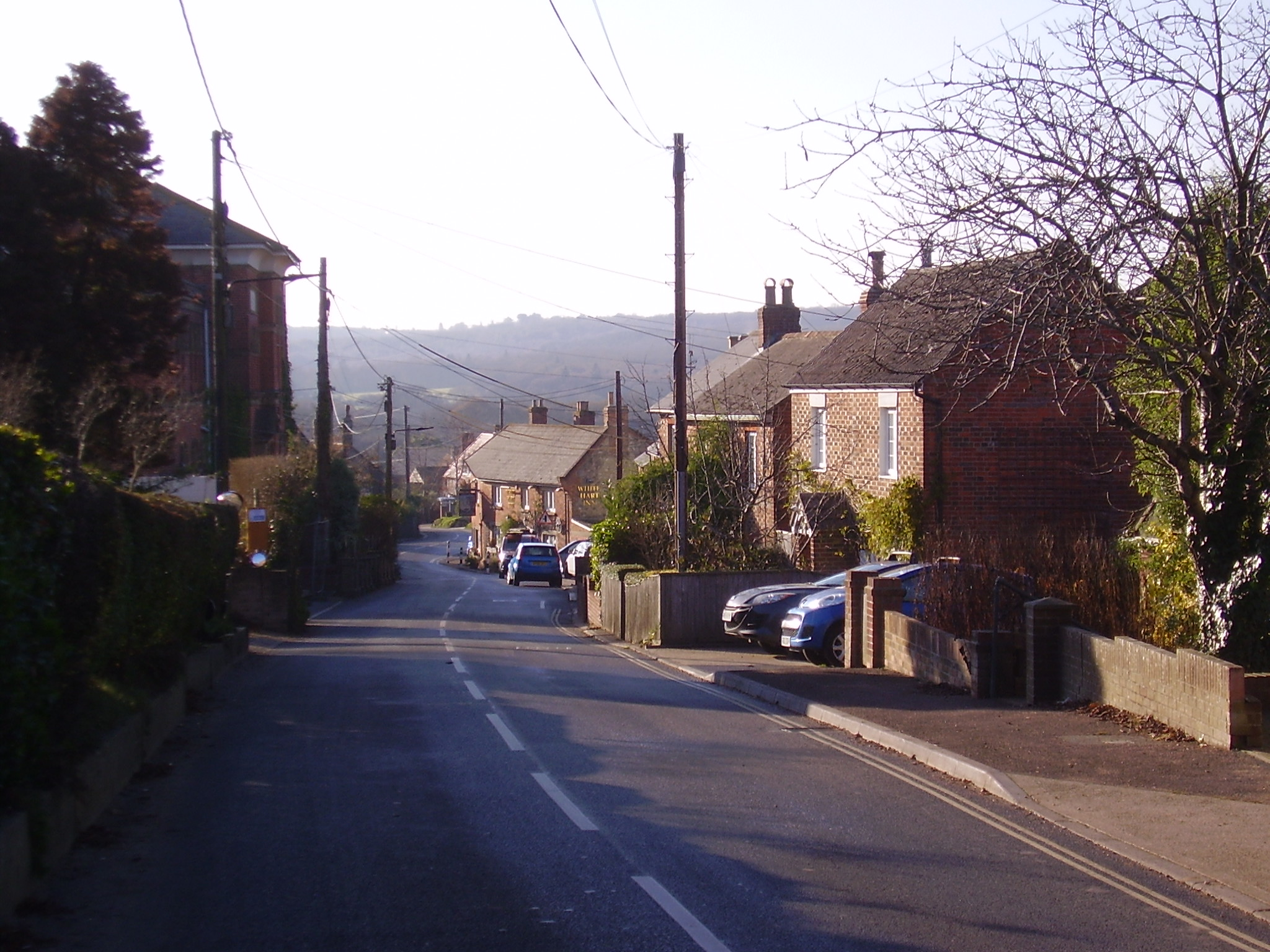
- The village of Havenstreet

- Location within the Isle of Wight
- Population: 3,613 (Parish)
- OS grid reference: SZ559902
- Civil parish: Havenstreet and Ashey
- Unitary authority: Isle of Wight
- Ceremonial county: Isle of Wight
- Region: South East
- Country: England
- Sovereign state: United Kingdom
- Post town: Ryde
- Postcode district: PO33
- Police: Hampshire and Isle of Wight
- Fire: Hampshire and Isle of Wight
- Ambulance: Isle of Wight
- UK Parliament: Isle of Wight East

Havenstreet (also spelt Haven Street) is a village on the Isle of Wight, located about 2 miles southwest of Ryde, in the civil parish of Havenstreet and Ashey.

== Name ==
The name probably means 'the heathen street, i.e. the street though to have been built or used by pagans', from Old English hǣthen and strǣt. This is the most common theory. Jutish or Saxon settlers may have referred to ancient roads or tracks like this. The first element could have the more literal meaning 'heathland, heathy', with the meaning 'the street running through heathland', but this is less likely. The name could also mean 'the street (of houses) belonging to a man called (Richard) la Hethene' , from a document relating to Havenstreet in ~1250. The name has no association with a haven.

1255: Hethenestrete

1338: la Hethenestrete

1468: Hethynstret

1769: Haven Street

== History ==
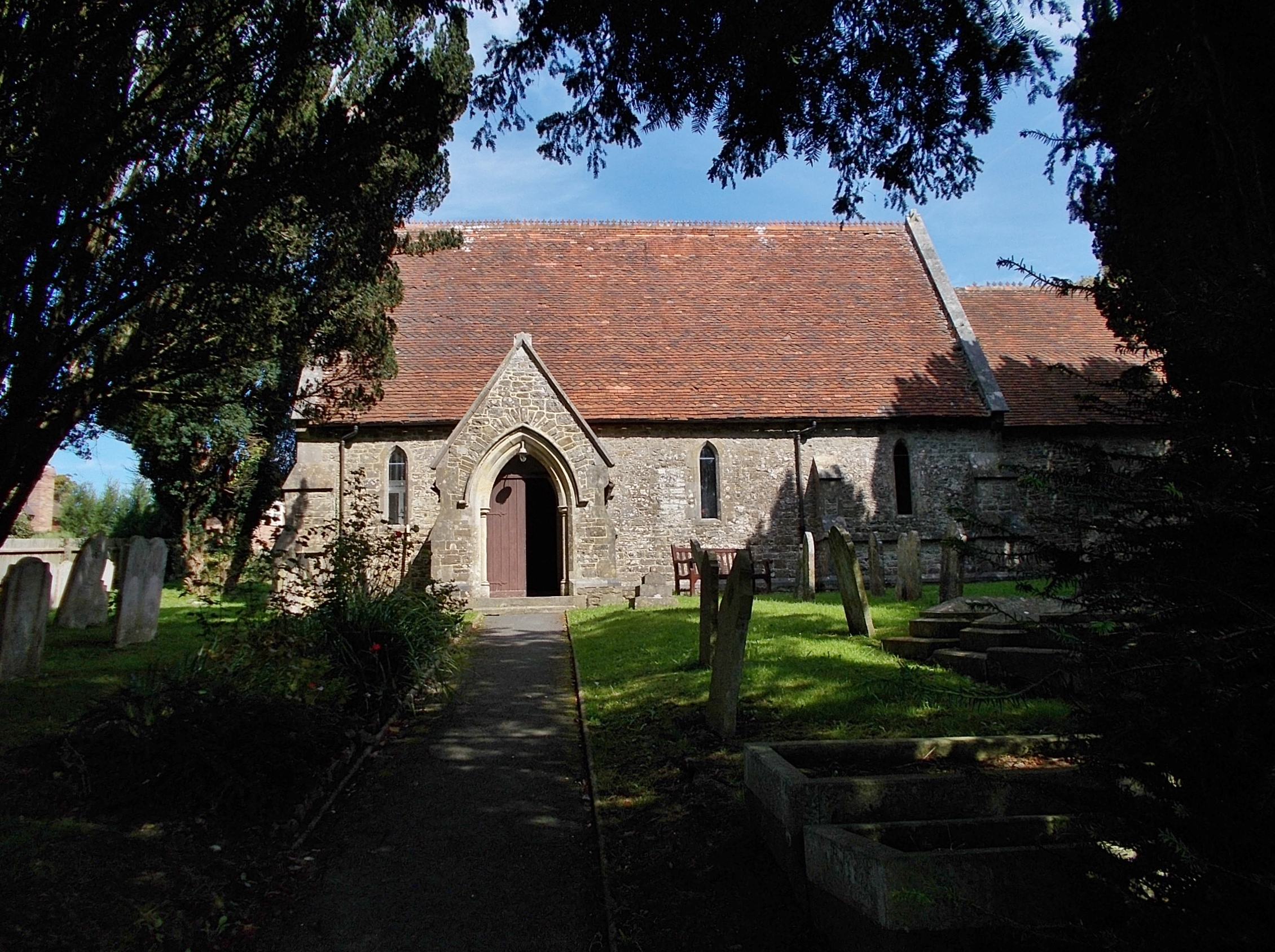
St Peter's Church, Havenstreet

The Isle of Wight Steam Railway, running between Wootton and Smallbrook, passes through Havenstreet railway station. Trains run throughout the summer and over Christmas. The Train Story museum, at Havenstreet, provides tourists with a history of the Island's railways.

A notable Victorian resident was Lancashire industrialist John Rylands who bought land in the village in 1882 and built a large house named Longford, after his primary residence, Longford Hall, in Lancashire. The house is now used as the Northbrooke Nursing Home.

A First World War shrine, dedicated on 30 June 1918, is a prominent landmark that stands on a hill north of Havenstreet village. The shrine was built in 1917 by local landowner John Willis Fleming, to honour the memory of his son, as well as all the other men of the parishes of Binstead and Havenstreet who had been killed in the war. An identical war shrine, the Stoneham War Shrine, was built at the same time at North Stoneham in Hampshire.

== Governance ==
Havenstreet is part of the electoral ward called Havenstreet, Ashey and Haylands. The population of this ward at the 2011 census was 3,613.

== See also ==
- St Peter's Church, Havenstreet
