= North Stoneham Park =

Country estate in Hampshire, England

Coordinates: 50°57′18.4″N 1°22′34.3″W

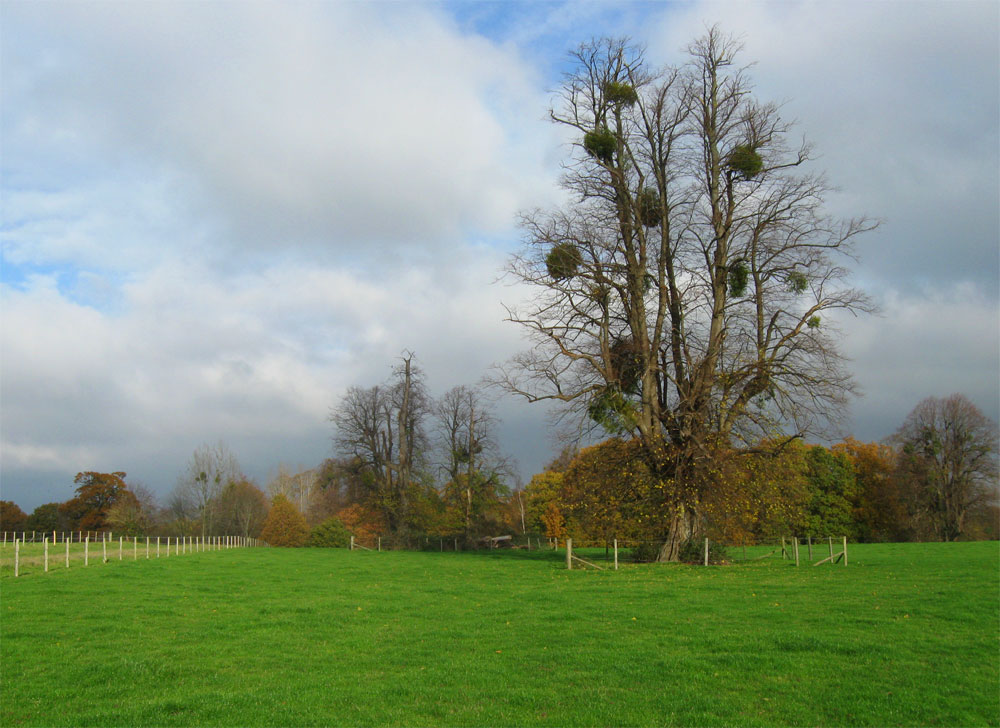
The Avenue portion of North Stoneham Park in 2011, described as 'a very high grade Brownian landscape'.

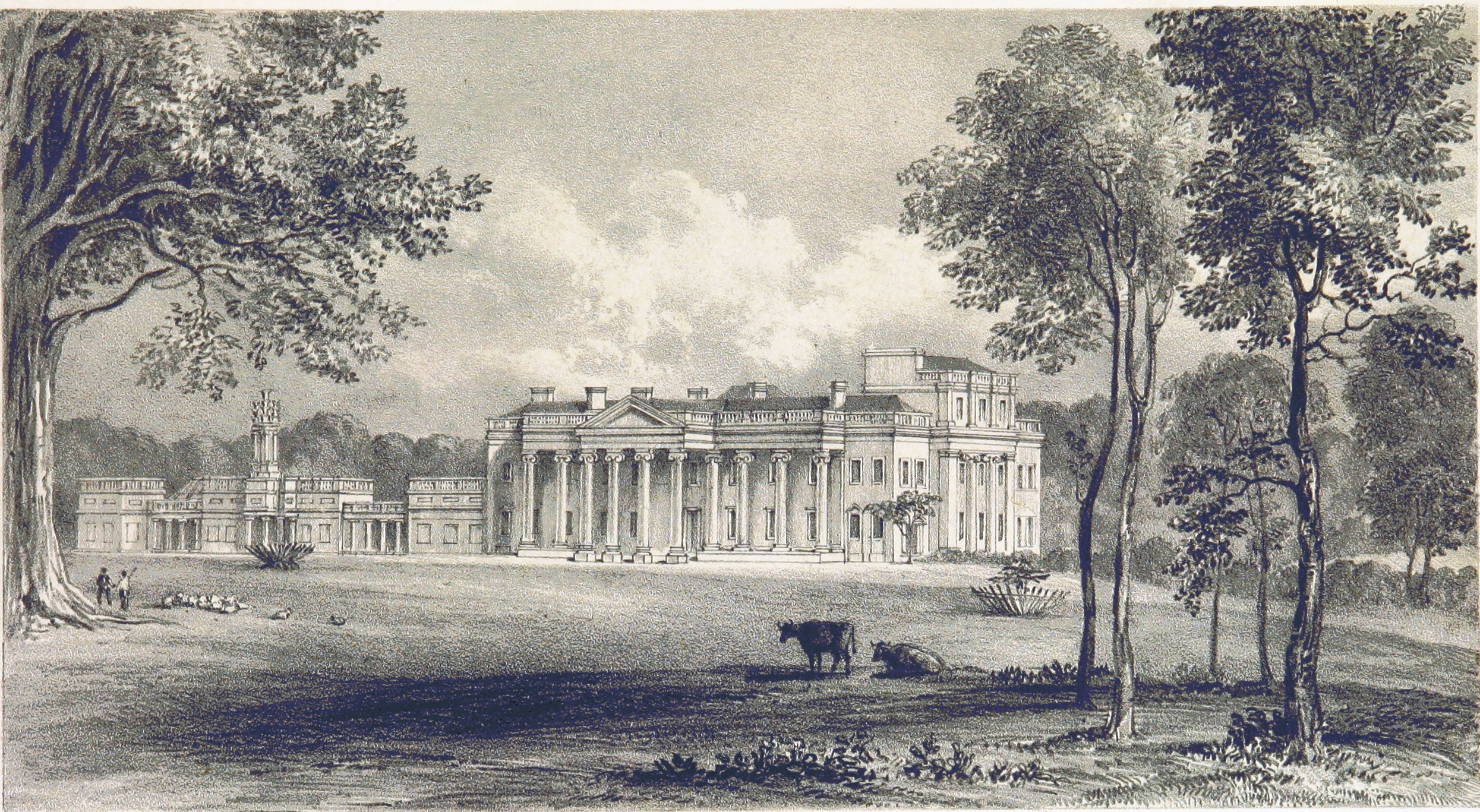
North Stoneham House

North Stoneham Park, also known as Stoneham Park, was a landscaped parkland and country house of the same name, north of Southampton at North Stoneham, Hampshire. It was the seat of the Fleming (subsequently Willis Fleming) family. The park was remodelled by Lancelot Brown in the 18th century. It is listed in the Hampshire Register of Historic Parks and Gardens. The house was demolished in 1939.

In 2011, controversial plans were announced to build 1,300 new houses on the surviving portion, Avenue Park.

== Origins ==
The deer park at North Stoneham was probably part of a Saxon ecclesiastical estate in the early Middle Ages. Later it belonged to Hyde Abbey. Following the Dissolution of the Monasteries, the manor was acquired in 1545 by Henry Wriothesley, 2nd Earl of Southampton. In 1599, Henry Wriothesley, 3rd Earl of Southampton sold the North Stoneham estate to Sir Thomas Fleming, whose descendants owned it until 1953.

== Stoneham War Shrine ==
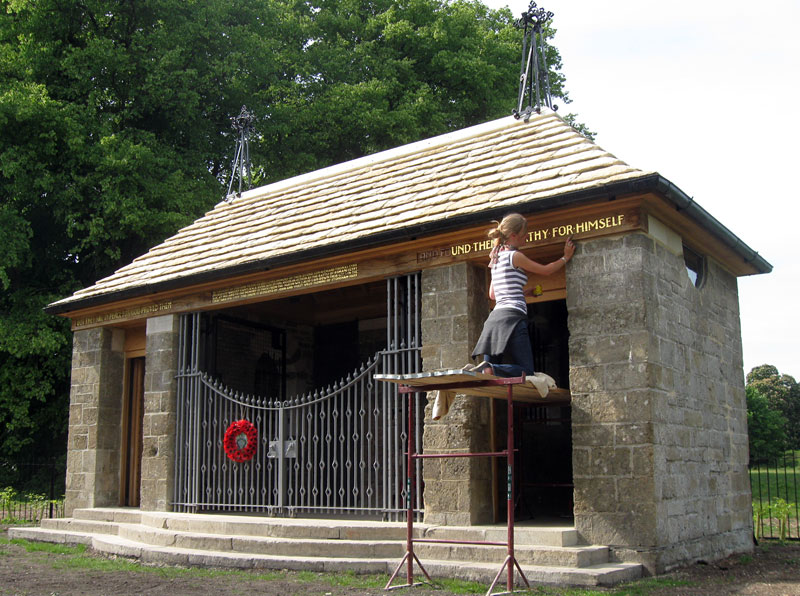
The restored war shrine in 2011

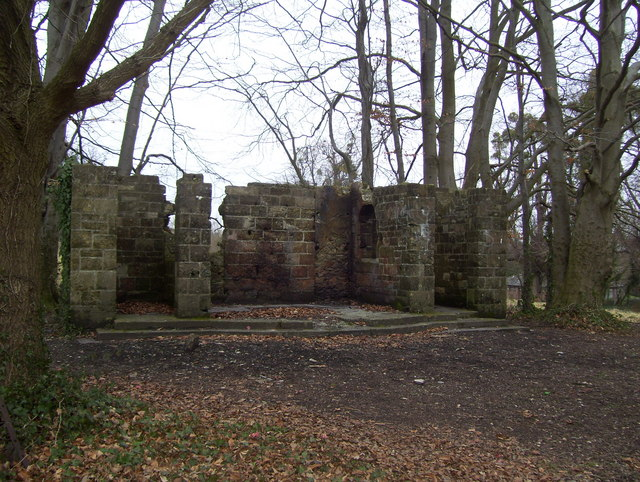
Remains of the war shrine in 2009

The Stoneham War Shrine was built in 1917–18 in the Avenue Park portion of the parkland by John Willis Fleming, in memory of thirty-six local men killed in World War I, including his own son Richard. (An identical shrine was built at Havenstreet, Isle of Wight). The Stoneham War Shrine was sited on Cricketers' Hill, facing towards St. Nicolas' Church along the line of the former Avenue. The monument was designed by the architect Christopher Hatton Turnor, who had designed the Watts Gallery in Surrey. The Shrine was dedicated on 28 July 1918 by James Macarthur, Bishop of Southampton. During the late 20th century, the Shrine fell into an advanced state of dereliction. In 2011, it was restored to its original condition, and was re-dedicated on 22 May 2011.

== Preservation of the Avenue portion of the Park ==
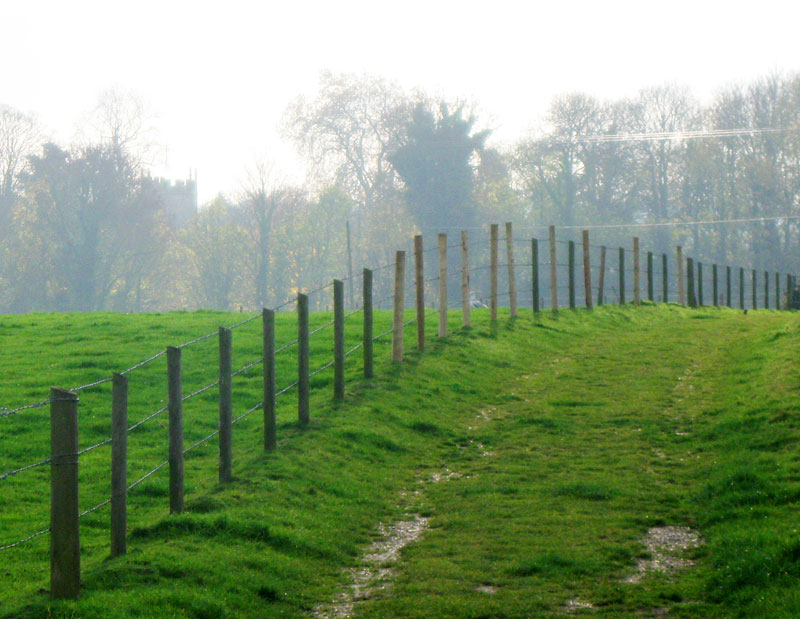
The tower of St Nicolas' church seen across the Avenue in 2011

In 1967, Pevsner described in his Buildings of England: Hampshire and the Isle of Wight how the parkland formed "a narrow but effective green belt between Eastleigh and Southampton". From 1991, Hampshire County Council recognized that efforts should be made to conserve, restore, and enhance North Stoneham Park as a viable historic and natural landscape, and commissioned a number of surveys and evaluations.

[North Stoneham Park’s] landscape is almost unique at present in that it is one of the few ancient manors in England where development can be traced in an almost uninterrupted line for two thousand years. … It should be afforded greater merit as part of [Southampton's] heritage than its present status affords. Efforts should be made to prevent any future deprivations, and attempts should be made to bring as much of this landscape into public ownership as possible for use as a recreational, and above all, unique educational resource that it represents. There are few other places in the United Kingdom where such unbroken continuity in the landscape can be demonstrated to the public.

— Christopher K. Currie, North Stoneham Park: its origin and development (1992).

Following these surveys, the need to protect and restore the remaining parkland was built into local and regional plans. The Eastleigh-Southampton Strategic Gap Planning and Management Framework (1993) set out the objectives to reduce further damage to the landscape, bring portions of land into public ownership as a ‘recreational and educational resource’, and protect and reinstate surviving features.

North Stoneham Park is a site of considerable historic and landscape interest which has become severely degraded ... Nevertheless, it retains a large number of historic features worth safeguarding, is a significant element in the Eastleigh Southampton urban fringe, and has great potential for future use if ownership problems can be overcome. It is at the centre of the Eastleigh Southampton Strategic Gap and an improvement of its present landscape character is essential to the improvement of the environmental quality of the gap. Although parts of the original landscape have been degraded or destroyed ... the parkland character of the landscape survives over a considerable part of the area, together with a number of historical features. The most important of these features are the remnants of The Avenue (which pre-dates Capability Brown’s work), three man-made ponds, the walled garden and a shrine ...

— The Eastleigh-Southampton Strategic Gap Planning and Management Framework (1993)

The Framework was adopted in 1995 by Eastleigh Borough Council and Test Valley Council, and the restoration of Avenue area took place in phases between 1995 and 2011. In 1996, the southern portion (61 acres) of the Avenue was placed in public ownership. In 2000, a well-received landscape restoration project to the whole of the Avenue area, including Eastleigh Borough Council’s northern portion (13 acres). The Southern Daily Echo reported: 'The huge restoration project of the vital green lung on Easteigh's southern boundary with Southampton has been made possible through a partnership of Eastleigh council with local people.' The £100,000 restoration was funded by developers' contributions following the redevelopment of North Stoneham Rectory. In 2008, Heritage Lottery-funding was awarded towards the project in order to return the Stoneham War Shrine to its original condition and further the conservation of the surrounding parkland.

== Plans to build 1,300 houses in the Avenue portion of the Park ==
In 2011, Eastleigh Borough Council published the Draft Eastleigh Borough Local Plan 2011-2029, which included the recommendation that up to 1,300 houses plus community facilities should be built on the surviving Avenue area of North Stoneham Park. The designated area includes the Avenue area that was placed in public ownership in 1996 and restored in 2000. The Plan states that the area "is not subject to major environmental constraints" and that "it is acknowledged that it forms part of an historic landscape, but much of this has now become degraded." The Council's 13-acre countryside site however would not be included: "The part that is of most interest (the woodland surrounding the Shrine) would be protected". The plan states that "whilst the site was previously part of the strategic gap separating Southampton and Eastleigh, it is considered that the contribution that development on this site would make to addressing housing needs outweighs the limited erosion of this gap."
