= Southampton Municipal Golf Course =

- Southampton Municipal Golf Course within England
- 50.947222°N 1.418056°W

Club information
- Location: Southampton, England
- Established: 1935
- Type: Public (municipal)
- Operator: Southampton City Council
- Tota holes: 27
- Designed by: J.H. Taylor
- Par: 70
- Length: 6,174 yards (5,646 m)
- Course rating: 68.9
- Slope rating: 118

Southampton Municipal Golf Course is a 27-hole golf course in Southampton, England. The par 70, 6174yd, 18-hole course is set in mature parkland. It is home to Southampton Golf Club.

== History ==
After World War I, Sir Sidney Kimber envisaged the council providing leisure activities to the people of Southampton. Until this point, the majority of private clubs were fairly exclusive and ‘the working man’ was not invited.

The course was designed by five time Open Championship winner J.H. Taylor, and was completed in 1935. Southampton was hailed as the best Municipal golf course in England when it opened before the outbreak of the World War II. However, it wasn’t until after the war that it became playable throughout the year.

When the game began to boom during the 1980s and 1990s, there were close to 200,000 rounds being played at the golf course each year. However, as more ‘pay as you play’ facilities opened up in Hampshire, the figures dropped to 70,000 per year – although in 2004 the figures rose to 100,000 per year.

In June 2010, a £3 million deal was lined up for MyTime Active, a charitable trust, to run the golf course which was estimated to save the taxpayer £350,000 and drive up customer numbers.

== Impact of Covid-19 pandemic ==
=== Covid-19 struggles ===
Due to the COVID-19 restrictions caused by the COVID-19 pandemic in the United Kingdom, leisure centres were forced to closed for months in line with government guidelines. On 1 April 2021, Southampton City Council took over the management of the golf course after the previous operator had been hit by the pandemic and the expiry of their contract.

=== Southampton City Council and recovery ===
Following the change in management to Southampton City Council, essential grounds work was carried out on the golf course to bring it back to use. Plugs of soil were removed from the green and a feed, seed and sand mix was spread to rejuvenate the putting surfaces, whilst irrigation work was also carried out.

In late 2021, further work was completed on the golf course, including improvements to the greens, drainage, the playability of the course, paths along with other improvements. The council will also be improving the cottages. However, a recent bat survey revealed the presence of roosting bats within the cottages, which are legally protected, and are working with an ecologist to ensure the refurbishment is carried out correctly and in line with the National England mitigation license that has been granted.

== Post-pandemic ==
On 19 August 2023, the golf course was vandalised by quadbikers which damaged the club's greens and left part of the course unusable to the club's members. The club's committee member, Matthew Longland, said this was the fourth time the course had been subjected to vandalism in 2023 and it would take until the end of the year for the green to recover.
