= St Peter's Church, Havenstreet =

Church on the Isle of Wight, England

Coordinates: 50°42′35″N 01°12′22″W

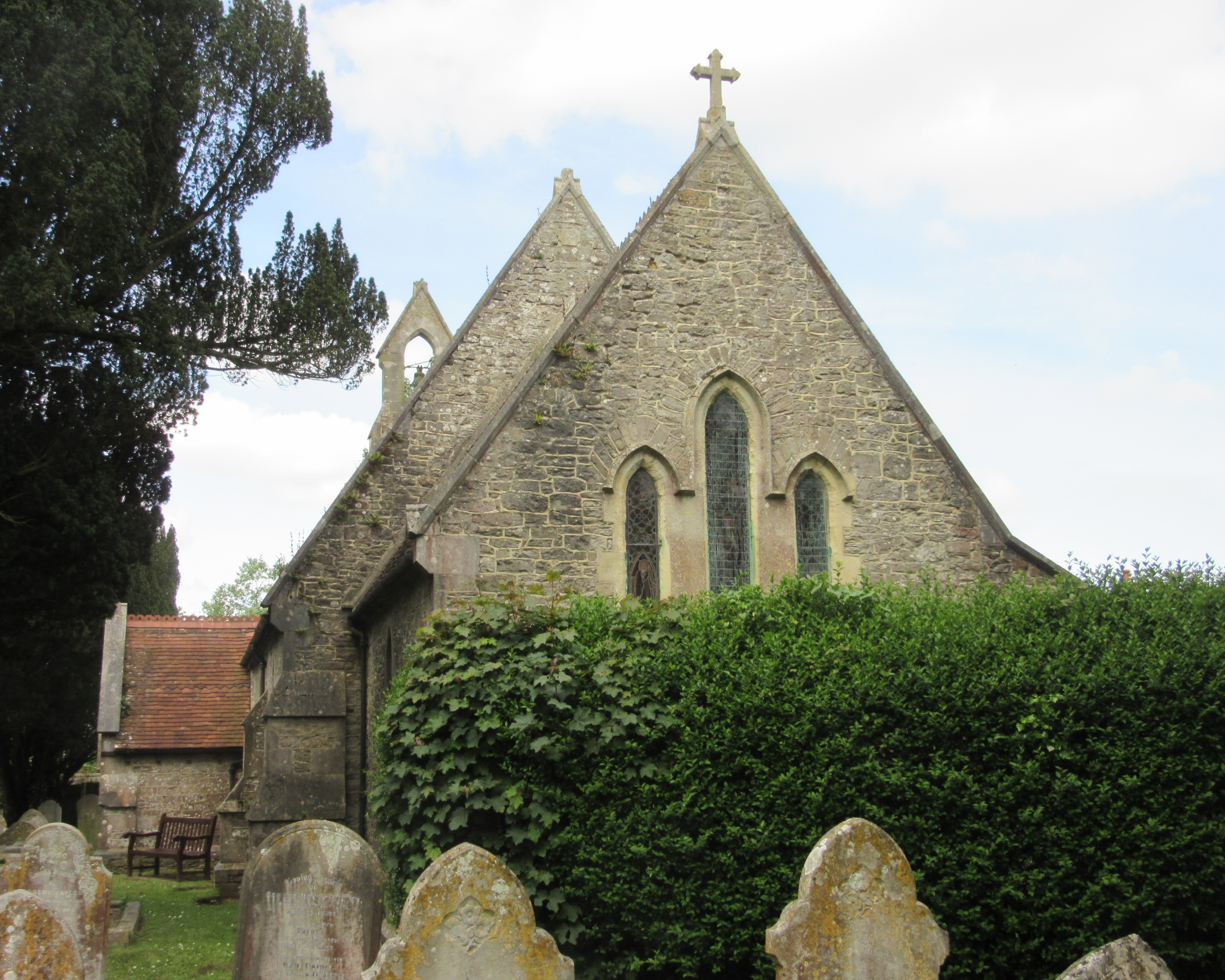
- St Peter's Church, Havenstreet
- Denomination: Church of England
- Churchmanship: Broad Church

History
- Dedication: St Peter

Administration
- Province: Canterbury
- Diocese: Portsmouth
- Parish: Havenstreet

St Peter's Church, Havenstreet is a parish church in the Church of England located in Havenstreet, Isle of Wight.

== History ==
The church dates from 1852 by the architect Thomas Hellyer. It consists of the chancel, nave, south porch and bell turret, with one bell that was built in the same year as the infrastructure.

The ecclesiastical parish of St Peter, Haven Street was formed from parts of the parishes of Arreton and Newchurch in 1853.

The churchyard contains Commonwealth war graves of two Hampshire Regiment soldiers who served during World War I.
