= Bassett Green =

Suburb of Southampton, England

Coordinates: 50.94°N 1.39°W

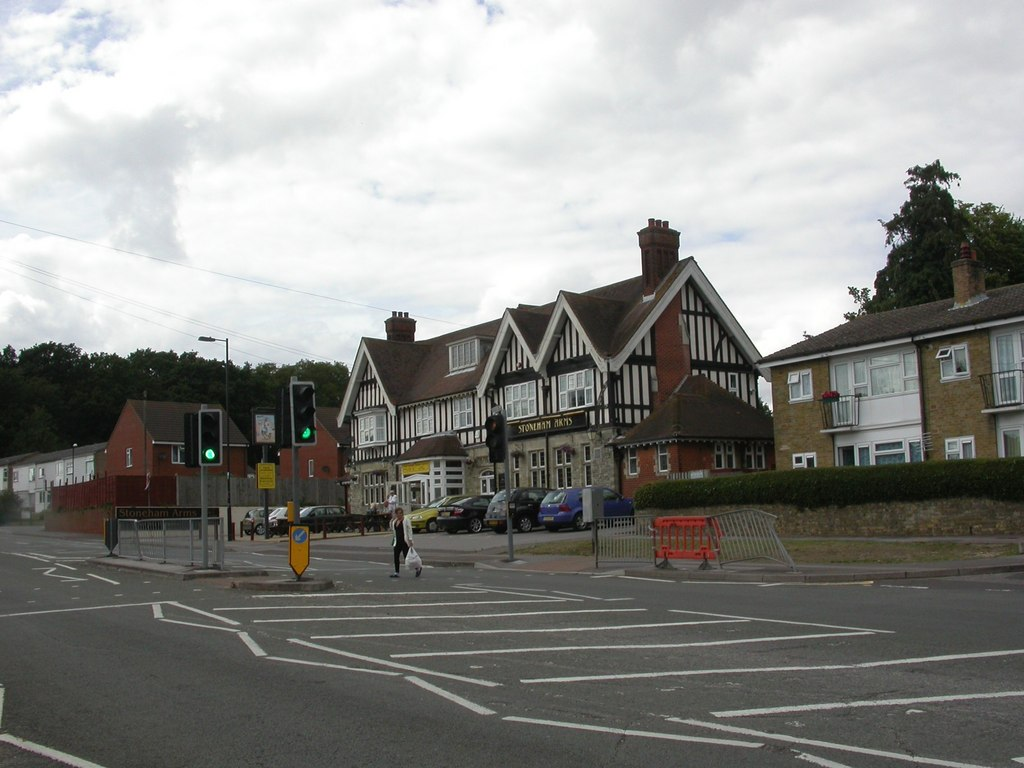
- The Stoneham Arms pub, now converted to a convenience store

- Location within Southampton
- Unitary authority: Southampton
- Ceremonial county: Hampshire
- Region: South East
- Country: England
- Sovereign state: United Kingdom
- Post town: SOUTHAMPTON
- Postcode district: SO16
- Dialling code: 023
- Police: Hampshire and Isle of Wight
- Fire: Hampshire and Isle of Wight
- Ambulance: South Central
- UK Parliament: Romsey and Southampton North

Bassett Green is a suburb of Southampton, in England, which has grown from the historical small village of Basset. It remains part of the electoral ward of Bassett (q.v. for population). The area is mainly residential, with a large variety of Herbert Collins-designed houses including the conservation area of Ethelburt Avenue and the Leaside Way Estate. Within Bassett Green are a wide variety of green spaces accompanied by a community centre (on Honeysuckle Road), Bassett Green Primary School and Southampton Crematorium, as well as several of the University of Southampton's halls of residence.

Neighbouring areas are Bassett to the west, North Stoneham to the north, Swaythling to the east & southeast, and Highfield to the southwest.

Bassett Green is divided between two ecclesiastical parishes: North Stoneham & Bassett and Swaythling.

== History ==
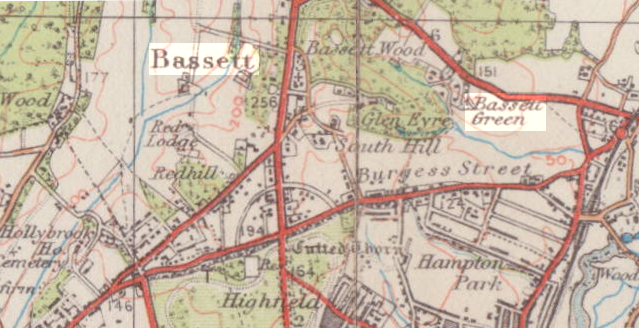
Ordnance Survey map of 1935 showing locations of Bassett and Bassett Green.

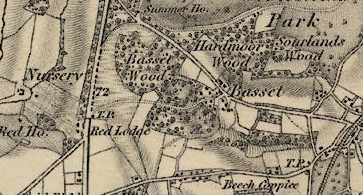
1810 Ordnance Survey map showing location of "Basset", where Bassett Green is located today

A family named 'Basset' is known to have lived in South Stoneham in the 15th century and the place name may be from their name. The area broadly occupied by Bassett today was known as Stoneham Common, shown on the 1791 map by Thomas Milne on which 'Bassets Lane' also appears (without any associated village). The village of Bassett appears on an 1810 map, located roughly where Bassett Green Village is today. In the late 18th century it grew as a retreat for rich people outside (and away from civic responsibilities in) the borough of Southampton. By the time of the Ordnance Survey of 1897, Basset had been renamed Bassett Green (with a double 't'), whilst a more westerly area (west of Bassett Wood) was identified as Bassett.

Part of the contract to build Southampton Civic Centre required the construction of social housing. The resulting housing estate was built between Swaythling and Bassett Green and is today known as the Flowers Estate or Flower Roads, as the street names on the estate carry a botanical theme.

== Education ==
Bassett Green is served by Bassett Green Primary School on Honeysuckle Road and Cantell Secondary School on Violet Road. Cantell is a comprehensive secondary school with a specialism in Mathematics and Information and Communication Technology, and is thus officially titled Cantell Mathematics and Computing College. The school has also been largely rebuilt funded through the Private Finance Initiative.
