= Jimmy Chipperfield =

English footballer

John James Chipperfield (4 March 1894 – 1966) was an English footballer born in Bethnal Green, London.

Prior to World War I, Chipperfield played for Luton Clarence and Luton Town. He played as a wartime guest for Arsenal during World War I, finishing as the club's top scorer in the London Combination in both 1916–17 and 1918–19. After the war ended he moved to Tottenham Hotspur, making his debut on 30 August 1919, scoring twice. Chipperfield played for Spurs for two seasons, winning promotion to the First Division in 1919–20 and scoring six goals in total that season. He made his last appearance in a Spurs shirt on 11 April 1921. After Tottenham he played for Notts County (18 league games, 2 goals) and Northfleet before joining Charlton Athletic in 1923 (3 league games, 0 goals). He played most of his career as an outside left.
