= Chilworth, Hampshire =

Village in Hampshire, England

Coordinates: 50°58′N 1°25′W

Chilworth
- Village
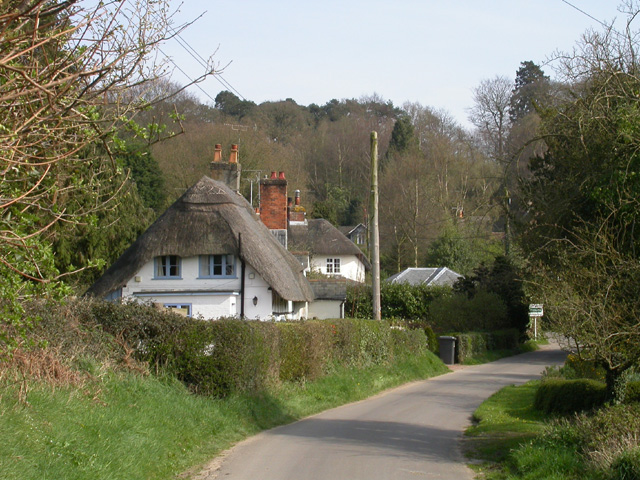
- The old village

- Location within Hampshire
- Population: 1,204 (2011 Census)
- District: Test Valley
- Shire county: Hampshire
- Region: South East
- Country: England
- Sovereign state: United Kingdom
- Post town: SOUTHAMPTON
- Postcode district: SO16
- Dialling code: 023
- Police: Hampshire and Isle of Wight
- Fire: Hampshire and Isle of Wight
- Ambulance: South Central

Map showing Chilworth in relation to Southampton

Chilworth is a village in the Test Valley district of Hampshire, England, on the northern edge of Southampton. Good travel connections and restricted development have led to the village becoming particularly affluent. The village was referred to as Celeworda in the Domesday Book of 1086, and is now in two parts: modern Chilworth lying along the straight 'new' stretch of the Southampton to Romsey road, and old Chilworth built around the 'old' road.

== Etymology ==
Chil is an aspirate mutation of the Common Brittonic noun cil meaning "angle or corner" and having the implication of "boundary". The suffix worth is the Middle English cognate of the proto-Germanic warō meaning "those that care for, watch, guard, protect, or defend". (Note: Anglo-Saxon scribes added two consonants to the Latin alphabet to render th sounds: first the runic thorn (þ), and later eth (ð). However, the word is waru in Old English, Old Frisian and Old Saxon and did not natively go through this process. Instead it appears that the later Anglo-Saxons encountered the proto-Germanic form of the word - perhaps in the Proto-Norse language prior to the formation of Old Norse - implying Germanic settlement at Chilworth from Scandinavia in the fifth century.) The name literally translates as two nouns: "boundary-guards."

== Chilworth Old Village ==
Chilworth Old Village, at the west end, consists of former farm workers' thatched cottages interspersed with modern houses and bungalows built in the 1950s. The Anglican Church of St Denys, which lies on the edge of the Old Village, was rebuilt in 1812 and is noted for its old bells which date from about the year 1200. Chilworth Old Village was designated a conservation area on 1 November 1989. Most of the buildings from the 16th century are situated in the Chilworth Old Village Conservation Area. The exceptions are Manor Farm and the Beehives, the latter of which are the lodges to Chilworth Manor Hotel.

== University of Southampton Science Park ==
Chilworth is home to the University of Southampton Science Park, formerly known as the Chilworth Science Park. Construction started in 1984 with the first buildings finished in 1986. It houses the main satellite uplink earth station of Sky UK (formerly known as BSkyB, British Sky Broadcasting and BSB, British Satellite Broadcasting). This facility uplinks signals (both Sky and some third party) to the Astra satellites at 28.2° east.

== Facilities ==
There is a small public house on the main road through the village called The Chilworth Arms (formerly The Clump). The original name of the pub, 'The Clump' comes from an old earthwork. Chilworth has a village hall and football field near the pub and there is a kennel and cattery in Chilworth Common, one of the local wooded areas. The thatched post office building was originally built as a kennel for the local hounds before being handed over to the village in 1900. Now both the Post Office and the convenience store are closed.

Since the early 1960s, there has been a Village Hall, situated on the edge of the Village Green behind what is now the Chilworth Arms. Administered by a charitable trust, the Hall is available to the residents of Chilworth and the immediately surrounding vicinity, for meetings, events and many other forms of recreation and leisure-time occupation, with the object of generating and improving a local community spirit.

The village is also home to Chilworth Golf Club, situated on Main Road, Southampton. The club offers an 18-hole golf course, a driving range, and a modern clubhouse. It is a member of Hampshire Golf and provides facilities for both individual and group play.

== Chilworth Manor ==
Chilworth Manor was a mansion house on the Chilworth Estate. John Willis Fleming rebuilt the house in 1904. The Flemings sold Chilworth Manor in 1947. In 1967 it was sold by Catherine Ann Young, wife of British entrepreneur Jock Young (CEO of "Unity Heating"), to Southampton University and converted into a hall of residence. In 1990 it was developed into a conference and training centre. In 2001, AHM, a specialist management company, acquired the property. It is now a 97 bedroom hotel, conference and event venue run by Best Western.

== Notable people ==
Notable Chilworth residents have included circus impresario Jimmy Chipperfield and Southampton football stars Matthew Le Tissier, Francis Benali and James Beattie.

Richard Cockle Lucas (1800–1883), the sculptor, lived in Chilworth from 1854 onwards, originally at "The Tower of the Winds" (which stood opposite the former "Clump Inn"), and later at the nearby "Chilworth Tower".

== Village design statement ==
In February 2006 the Test Valley Borough Council issued a Village Design Statement for Chilworth to foster a vibrant community and preserve Chilworth's very special characteristics: its woodland, architecture and village environment.
