= Erich Zepler =

Electronics engineer, Chess problemist

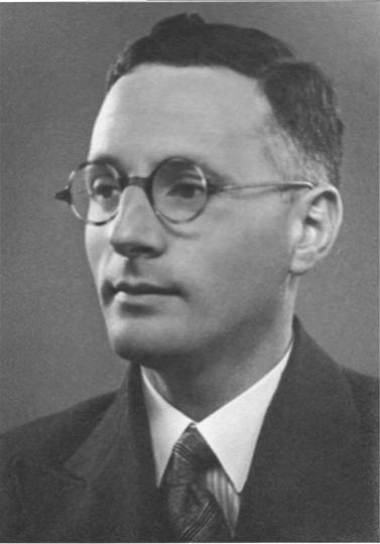
Erich Zepler (about 1923)

Erich Ernst Zepler (27 January 1898 - 13 May 1980), later known as Eric Ernest Zepler, was a German-born electronics expert, lecturer, and chess problem composer. He was a Christian, but of Jewish race. He fled Germany in 1935, with his family and most of his possessions. He settled in England, dropping the H in his first name, and adding an E to his middle name, to become Eric Ernest Zepler.

== Education ==
Zepler studied physics in Berlin and Bonn before receiving his doctorate from the University of Würzburg.

He was a Doctor of Philosophy (DPhil) of the University of Würzburg (by research), and a Doctor of Science (DSc) of the University of Southampton (by honorary award in 1977), where he had been Professor of Electronics for more than a decade.

== Working life ==
After completing his doctoral studies Zepler undertook further research at Würzburg University, before commencing work for Telefunken in Germany, eventually becoming head of the radio receiver laboratories. Having fled to England to avoid Nazi persecution, he found work with the Marconi Company.

In 1947 he founded the Department of Electronics at University College, Southampton (now the University of Southampton), one of the first in the world. In 1949 the post of Chair of Electronics was created for him. The department is now home to the Zepler Building, named after him. He wrote several textbooks on electronics, the best known being his first, The Technique of Radio Design. It is said that many of his radios were used in World War II (on both sides).

In 1980 a historic Telefunken T9W radio receiver, designed by Zepler in 1927-1928, and retained by the company in Germany as an example of pioneering work, was transferred to the School of Electronics and Computer Science at Southampton University as a heritage asset on permanent loan.

== Chess ==
Erich Zepler
First Prize, Berger Memorial, 1935

Position: b7 black pawn, f7 white king, h7 black pawn, f5 black pawn, c4 white queen, f4 white pawn, a3 black king, c3 white pawn, h3 white bishop, d2 white rook, b1 black queen

White to play. Mate in four.

Zepler was also a very significant figure in the field of chess problems. One of the leading composers of the new German school (also known as the logical school), he mainly composed three- and more-mover directmates, and also produced a small number of endgame studies. In 1957 he became an International Judge of Chess Compositions, and in 1973 an International Master of Chess Compositions. He is the eponym of Zepler doubling, after his pioneer problem published in the Hamburgischer Correspondent, 1929.

Zepler often worked with another German problemist, Adolf Kraemer; Im Banne des Schachproblems (1951, revised 1971) is a collection of their best work and considered one of the finest of all collections of chess problems. The two also published Problemkunst im 20.Jahrhundert (1956), a compilation of what they considered to be the finest 20th century problems. Their friendship was remarkable, since Kraemer was a member of the SA, and possibly of the SS.

The mate in four to the right is one of Zepler's numerous First Prize-winners, and demonstrates his logical style well. White would like to play 1.Ra2+ Qxa2 2.Qb4#, but the White queen is pinned to the king, making the mate impossible. White must therefore move his king to a different square; the direct approach with 1.Kf8 or 1.Kg7 fails to 1...Qb2!, and moves to the e-file allow 1...Qe1+, so instead the unobvious 1.Bxf5! is needed. After 1...Qxf5+ 2.Ke7 Qb1 (on any other checks, the queen is simply captured) we have the original position again except that the king is no longer on the a2-g8 diagonal, making the mate possible: 3.Ra2+ Qxa2 4.Qb4#.

Zepler was also a strong chess player being a member of Southampton Chess Club.

== Private life ==
Zepler was married, and he and his wife had two children, Carole and Matthew, both born in Germany.

== Publications ==
- The Technique of Radio Design Chapman & Hall 1943, 1949
- (& Punnet S W) Electronic Circuit Techniques Blackie 1963
- Electronic devices and networks Blackie 1963
- (& Havel J R P) The Loudness of Sonic Booms and other Impusive Sounds. J. Sound & Vibration vol.2(3), 1965, 249-256
- (& Nichols K G) Transients in Electronic Engineering Chapman & Hall 1971
