= Zepler doubling =

Chess manoeuvre

Erich Zepler
Hamburgischer Correspondent, 1929

Position: a8 black king, f8 black bishop, a7 black pawn, a6 black pawn, d6 white pawn, a5 white pawn, c4 black pawn, c3 white pawn, a2 white pawn, g2 white rook, a1 white king, b1 white rook

Mate in three.

Zepler doubling is a manoeuvre in chess in which a piece moves along a certain line (rank, file or diagonal), then another friendly piece moves onto that same line, then the first piece moves again in the same direction as before. The term is effectively limited to the field of chess problems.

The first problem to show the idea (shown to the right), by Erich Zepler himself, is a simple and clear demonstration of the manoeuvre. The straightforward doubling 1.Rgb2, threatening 2.Rb8#, fails to 1...Bxd6, so the more roundabout Zepler doubling is required: 1.Rb4 Bg7 (now 1...Bxd6 is no good because of 2.Rg8+) 2.Rgb2 any 3.Rb8#.

Zepler doubling can be contrasted with another doubling manoeuvre, Turton doubling.
