= University of Southampton =

Research university in Southampton, England

- Coat of arms
- Motto: Latin: Strenuis Ardua Cedunt
- Motto in English: The Heights Yield to Endeavour
- Type: Public research university
- Established: 1862: Hartley Institution; 1902: Hartley University College; 1913: Southampton University College; 1952: gained university status by royal charter
- Affiliations: AACSB; ACU; AMBA; EUA; PUL; Russell Group; SES; SETsquared; Universities UK; WUN
- Endowment: £12.8 million (2025)
- Budget: £737.6 million (2024/25)
- Chancellor: jointly: Justine Greening and Baron Patel of Bradford
- Vice-Chancellor: Charlie Jeffery
- Visitor: Alan Campbell (as Lord President of the Council ex officio)
- Academic staff: 2,965 (2024/25)
- Administrative staff: 4,125 (2024/25)
- Students: 25,785 (2024/25); 24,340 FTE (2024/25)
- Undergraduates: 17,645 (2024/25)
- Postgraduates: 8,140 (2024/25)
- Location: Southampton, Hampshire, England; 50.93463°N 1.39595°W
- Campus: City Campus
- Colours: Marine Blue
- Website: southampton.ac.uk

The University of Southampton (abbreviated as Soton in post-nominal letters) is a public research university in Southampton, England. Southampton is a founding member of the Russell Group of research-intensive universities in the United Kingdom.

The university has seven campuses. The main campus is located in the Highfield area of Southampton and is supplemented by four other campuses within the city: Avenue Campus housing the School of Humanities, the National Oceanography Centre housing courses in Ocean and Earth Sciences, Southampton General Hospital offering courses in Medicine and Health Sciences, and Boldrewood Campus housing an engineering and maritime technology campus and Lloyd's Register. In addition, the university operates a School of Art based in nearby Winchester and an international branch in Malaysia offering courses in Engineering. In 2024, the university was the first in the UK to be awarded a licence to establish a campus in India. Each campus is equipped with its own library facilities. The annual income of the institution for 2024–25 was £737.6 million of which £141.4 million was from research grants and contracts, with an expenditure of £733.8 million.

The University of Southampton currently has 17,645 undergraduate and 8,140 postgraduate students, making it the largest university by higher education students in the South East region. The University of Southampton Students' Union, provides support, representation and social activities for the students ranging from involvement in the Union's four media outlets, to any of the 200 affiliated societies and 80 sports. The university owns and operates a sports ground for use by students and also operates a sports centre on the main campus.

== History ==
=== Hartley Institution ===
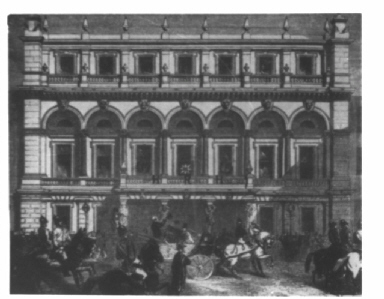
The arrival of Prime Minister Lord Palmerston for the opening of the Hartley Institute on 15 October 1862

The University of Southampton has its origin as the Hartley Institution which was formed in 1862 from a benefaction by Henry Robinson Hartley (1777–1850). Hartley had inherited a fortune from two generations of successful wine merchants. At his death in 1850, he left a bequest of £103,000 to the Southampton Corporation for the study and advancement of the sciences in his property on Southampton's High Street, in the city centre.

...employ the interest, dividends and annual proceeds in such a manner as best promote the study and advancement of the sciences of Natural History, Astronomy, Antiquities, Classical and Oriental Literature in the town, such as by forming a Public Library, Botanic Gardens, Observatory, and collections of objects with the above sciences.

— Bequest to the Corporation of Southampton of Henry Robertson Hartley estate.

Hartley was an eccentric straggler, who had little liking of the new age docks and railways in Southampton. He did not desire to create a college for many (as formed at similar time in other English industrial towns and commercial ports) but a cultural centre for Southampton's intellectual elite. After lengthy legal challenges to the Bequest, and a public debate as to how best interpret the language of his Will, the Southampton Corporation choose to create the Institute (rather than a more widely accessible college, that some public figures had lobbied for).

On 15 October 1862, the Hartley Institute was opened by the Prime Minister Lord Palmerston in a major civic occasion which exceeded in splendor anything that anyone in the town could remember. After initial years of financial struggle, the Hartley Institute became the Hartley College in 1883. This move was followed by increasing numbers of students, teaching staff, an expansion of the facilities and registered lodgings for students.

=== University College ===
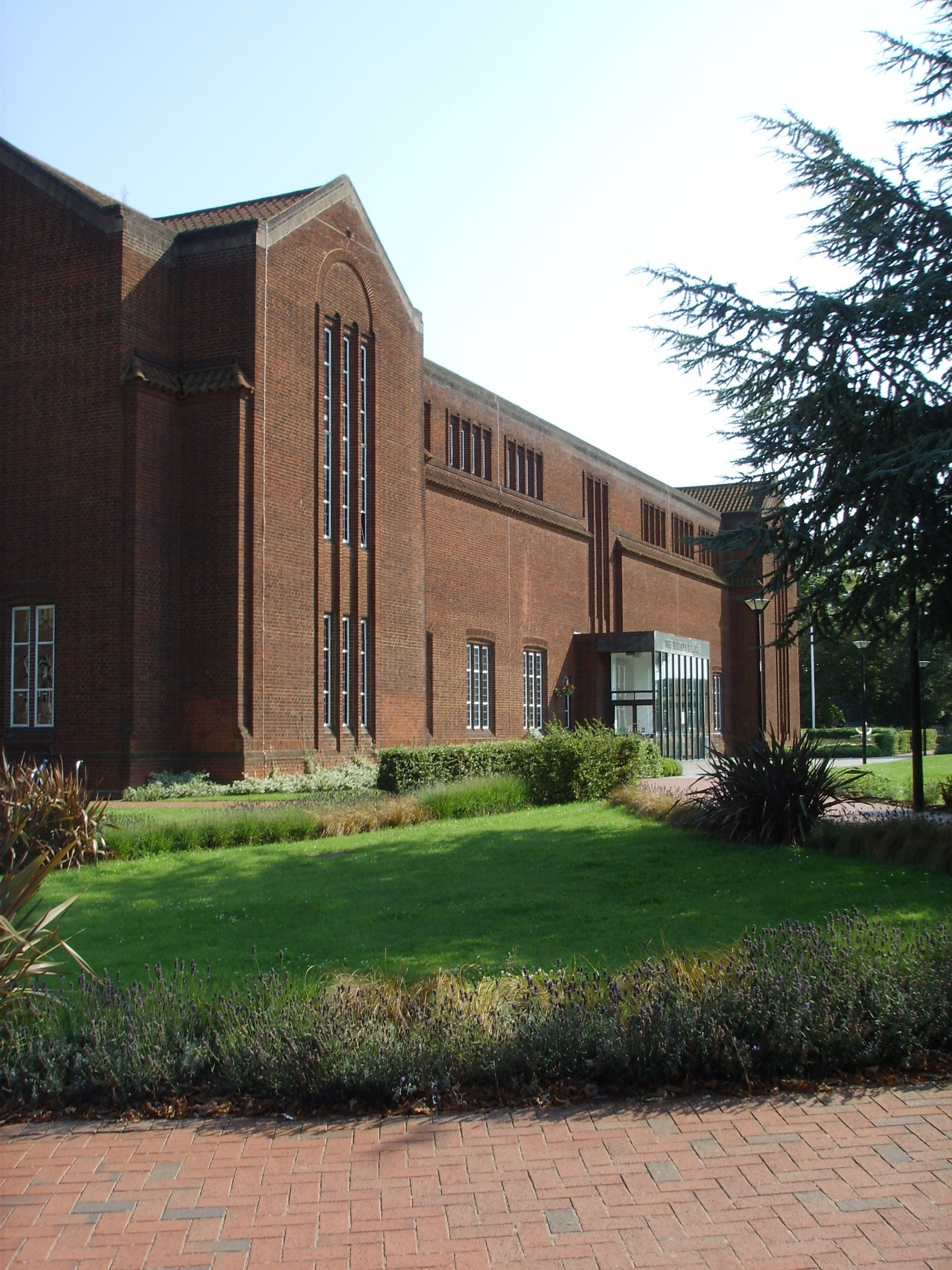
Front of the Hartley Library, constructed in the 1930s after the move to Highfield Campus, with the support of private donors.

In 1902, the Hartley College became the Hartley University College, a degree awarding branch of the University of London. This was after inspection of the teaching and finances by the University College Grants Committee, and donations from Council members (including William Darwin the then Treasurer). An increase in student numbers in the following years motivated fund raising efforts to move the college to greenfield land around Back Lane (now University Road) in the Highfield area of Southampton. On 20 June 1914, Viscount Haldane opened the new site of the renamed Southampton University College. However, the outbreak of the First World War six weeks later meant no lectures could take place there, as the buildings were handed over by the college authorities for use as a military hospital. To cope with the volume of casualties, wooden huts were erected at the rear of the building. These were donated to the university by the War Office after the end of fighting, in time for the transfer from the high street premises in 1920. At this time, Highfield Hall, a former country house and overlooking Southampton Common, for which a lease had earlier been secured, commenced use as a hall of residence for female students. South Hill, on what is now the Glen Eyre Halls Complex was also acquired, along with South Stoneham House to house male students.

Further expansion through the 1920s and 1930s was made possible through private donors, such as Edward Turner Sims's two daughters Mary and Margaret for the construction of the university library, to fulfil a request in his will, and from the people of Southampton, enabling new buildings on both sides of University Road. During World War II the university suffered damage in the Southampton Blitz with bombs landing on the campus and its halls of residence. The college decided against evacuation, instead expanding its Engineering Department, School of Navigation and developing a new School of Radio Telegraphy. The university hosted the Supermarine plans and design team for a period but in December 1940 further bomb hits resulted in it being relocated to Hursley House.

Halls of residence were used to house Polish, French and American troops. After the war, departments such as Electronics grew under the influence of professor Erich Zepler and the Institute of Sound and Vibration was established.

=== University ===
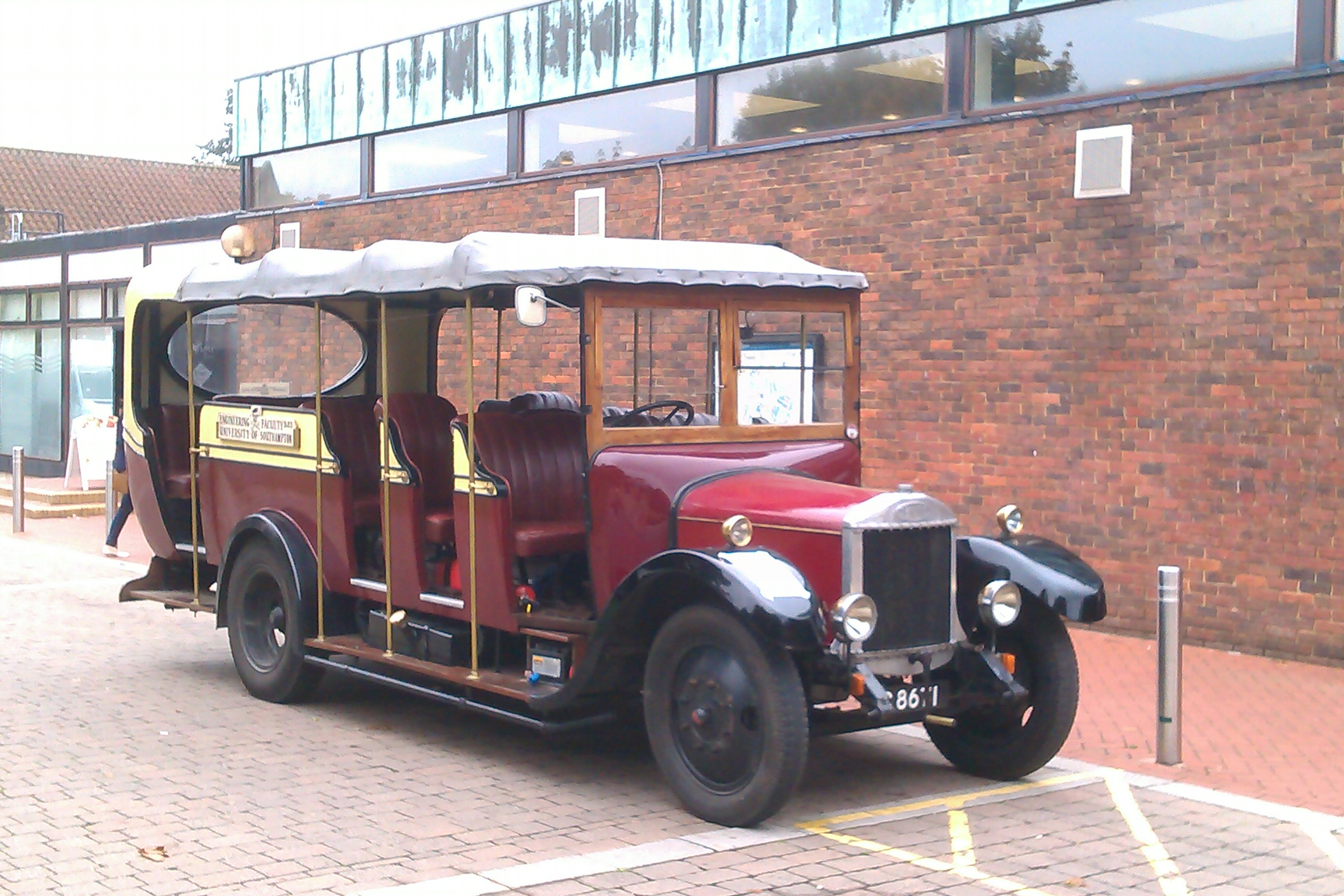
Toastrack, a 1929 Dennis G that has been owned by the University of Southampton Engineering Society since 1958.

University of Southampton Act 1953 (Note: Section 1.)
- Act of Parliament
- Parliament of the United Kingdom
- Long title: An Act to dissolve the Hartley University College at Southampton founded 1850 registered 1902 and to transfer all the rights property and liabilities of that college to the University of Southampton and for other purposes.
- Citation: 1 & 2 Eliz. 2. c. iv
- Territorial extent: United Kingdom

Dates
- Royal assent: 6 May 1953
- Commencement: 1 August 1953 (Note: Section 2.)
Other legislation
Amended by	Statute Law (Repeals) Act 1998

Status: Amended

Text of statute as originally enacted

On 29 April 1952, Queen Elizabeth II granted the University of Southampton a royal charter, the first to be given to a university during her reign, which enabled it to award degrees. Six faculties were created: Arts, Science, Engineering, Economics, Education and Law. The first University of Southampton degrees were awarded on 4 July 1953, following the appointment of the Duke of Wellington as Chancellor of the university. Student and staff numbers grew throughout the next couple of decades as a response to the Robbins Report. The campus also grew significantly, when in July 1961 the university was given the approval to acquire some 200 houses on or near the campus by the Borough Council. In addition, more faculties and departments were founded, including Medicine and Oceanography (despite the discouragement of Sir John Wolfenden, the chairman of the University Grants Committee). Student accommodation was expanded throughout the 1960s and 1970s with the acquisition of Chilworth manor and new buildings at the Glen Eyre and Montefiore complexes.

In 1987, a crisis developed when the University Grants Committee announced, as part of nationwide cutbacks, a series of reductions in the funding of the university. To eliminate the expected losses, the budgets and deficits subcommittee proposed reducing staff numbers. This proposal was met with demonstrations on campus and was later reworked (to reduce the redundancies and reallocate the reductions in faculties funding) after being rejected by the university Senate.

By the mid-1980s through to the 1990s, the university looked to expand with new buildings on the Highfield campus, developing the Chilworth Manor site into a science park and conference venue, opening the National Oceanography Centre at a dockside location and purchasing new land from the City Council for the Arts Faculty and sports fields (at Avenue Campus and Wide Lane, respectively).

=== Research university ===
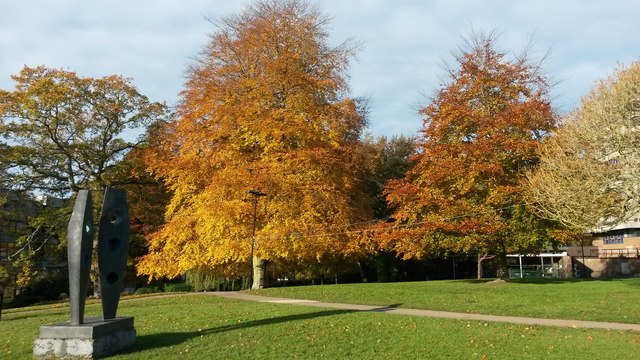
The Gardens on the west half of Highfield Campus were landscaped by Basil Spence and feature artwork by Barbara Hepworth.

Under the leadership of then Vice-Chancellor, Sir Howard Newby the university became more focused in encouraging and investment in more and better quality research. In the mid-1990s, the university gained two new campuses, as the Winchester School of Art and La Sainte Union College became part of the university. A new school for Nursing and Midwifery was also created and went on to provide training for NHS professionals in central-southern England. This involved a huge increase in student numbers and the establishment of sub-campuses in Basingstoke, Winchester, Portsmouth, and Newport, Isle of Wight.

In the autumn of 1997, the university experienced Britain's worst outbreak of meningitis, with the death of three students. The university responded to the crisis by organising a mass vaccination programme, and later took the ground-breaking decision to offer all new students vaccinations.

The university celebrated its Golden Jubilee on 22 January 2002. By this time, Southampton had research income that represented over half of the total income. In recent years a number of new landmark buildings have been added as part of the estates development. New constructions on the main campus include the Jubilee Sports Complex in 2004, the EEE (ECS, Education and Entrance) building in 2007, the new Mountbatten building in 2008 housing the School of Electronics and Computer Science following a fire, and the Life Sciences building in 2010. In addition, the Hartley Library and Student Services Centre were both extended and redesigned in 2005 and the Students' Union was also extended in 2002. Other constructions include the Archaeology building on Avenue Campus in 2006 and the Institute of Development Sciences building at Southampton General Hospital in 2007. The university has also significantly redeveloped its Boldrewood Campus which is home to part of the engineering faculty and to Lloyd's Register's Global Technology Centre.

The university joined the Science and Engineering South Consortium (SES) on 9 May 2013. The SES was created to pool the collective insights and resources of the University of Oxford, University of Cambridge, Imperial College London, and University College London, providing efficiencies of scale and shared utilisation of facilities.

In 2015, the university started a fundraising campaign to build the Centre for Cancer Immunology based at Southampton General Hospital. At the beginning of 2018, the target amount of £25 million was raised, allowing 150 scientists to move into the building in March 2018. The Centre for Cancer Immunology is the first of its kind in the UK and contains facilities that will host clinical trial units and laboratories that will explore the relationship between cancer and the immune system.

== Campuses ==
The university has eight educational campuses – five in Southampton, one in Winchester, and two international branches in Malaysia and India. The university operates a science park in Chilworth. The university also owns sports facilities and halls of residences on a variety of other nearby sites.

=== Highfield Campus ===
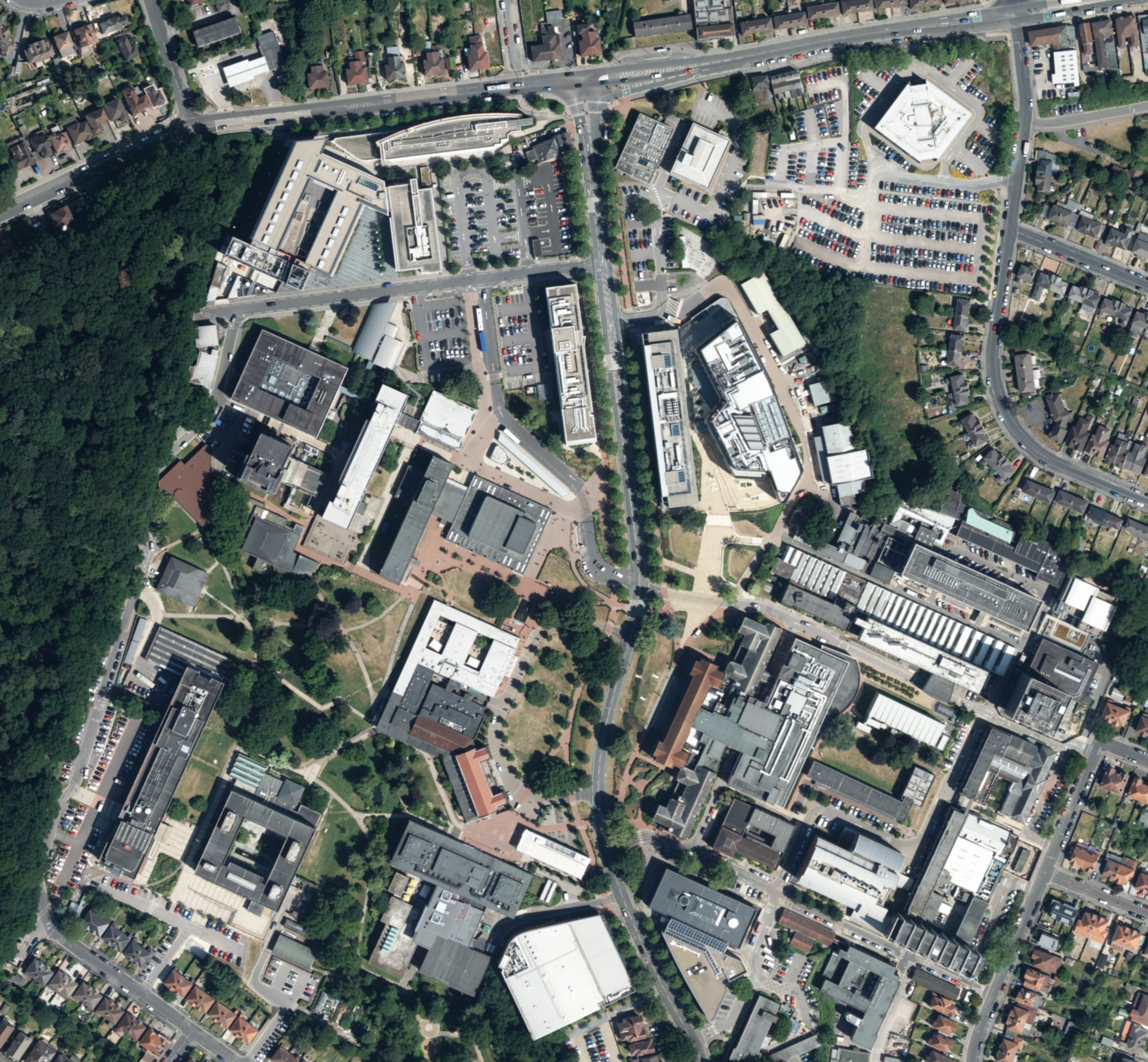
Aerial view of the Highfield Campus

The university's main campus is located in the residential area of Highfield. Opened on 20 June 1914, the site was initially used as a military hospital during World War I. The campus grew gradually, mainly consisting of detailed red brick buildings (such as the Hartley library and West building of the Students' Union) designed by Sir Giles Gilbert Scott. In 1956, Sir Basil Spence was commissioned to prepare a masterplan of the campus for the foreseeable future. This included incorporating the University Road, that split the 59-acre (24 ha) campus in two and the quarry of Sir Sidney Kimber's brickyard that itself was split by a stream. Unable to remove the road and the private houses along it, Spence designed many of the buildings facing away from it, using contemporary designs working in concrete, glass and mosaic. During recent decades, new buildings were added that contravened the master plan of Spence, such as the Synthetic Chemistry Building and Mountbatten Building (the latter of which was destroyed by fire in 2005).

In 1991, the Highfield Planning Group was formed within the university under the chairmanship of Tim Holt. This led to the development of new buildings such as the Jubilee Sports Hall, Student Services Building and the Institute of Sound and Vibration Research. In addition, existing buildings, such as the Hartley Library, were extensively renovated and extended. A new masterplan for the Highfield campus was drawn up in 1998 by Rick Mather, who proposed that the University Road should become a tree-lined boulevard backed by white-rendered buildings. He also contributed some of the newer buildings such as the Zepler and Gower Buildings.

=== Avenue Campus ===
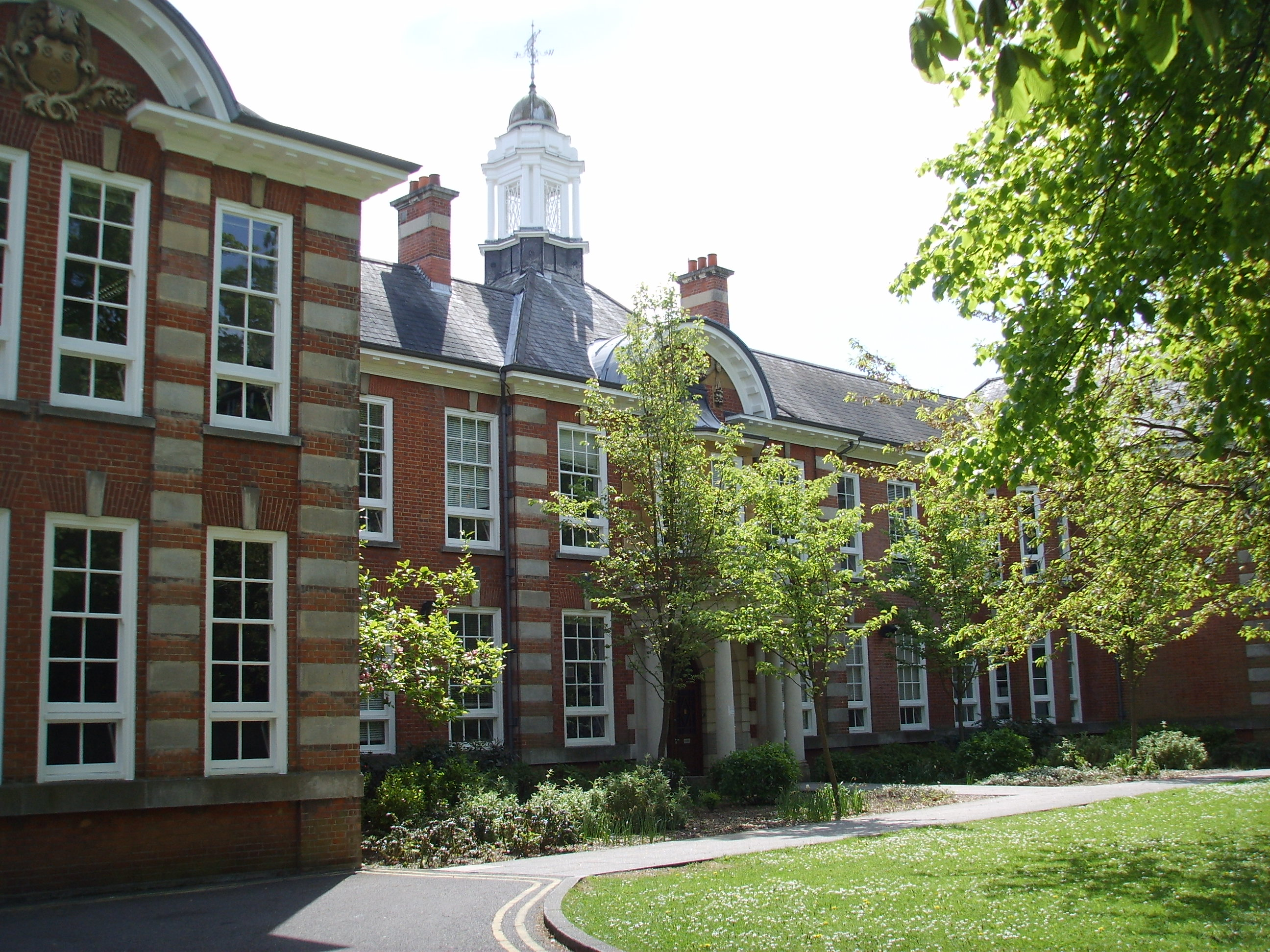
Avenue Campus

Avenue Campus is currently home to the Faculty of Humanities, with the exception of Music, and is located a short distance away from the main Highfield campus. The site previously housed the Southampton Tramsheds and Richard Taunton's College, of which the existing building still stands on the site. It was purchased by the university from Southampton City Council for £2 million in December 1993 so that the university could expand – planning regulations meant that excess land on the Highfield campus couldn't be built on and had to be reserved for future car parking spaces. The car parking spaces have now been built. The departments moved onto the campus in 1996. The campus consists of the original Tauntons building from the early 20th century but redeveloped with a glass-fronted courtyard and extension and a new Archaeology building built in 2006 costing £2.7 million.

=== Boldrewood Campus ===
Boldrewood Campus, located a short distance from the Highfield campus, houses the university's new Maritime Centre of Excellence, the Southampton Marine and Maritime Institute and Lloyd's Register's Group Technology Centre.

The campus was formerly the Biomedical Sciences campus of the university and acted, until 2010, as a non-hospital base for the School of Medicine and home to a research facility for the Biological Sciences. These departments were then relocated to either Southampton General Hospital, the new Life Sciences building at Highfield, or the University of Southampton science park.

=== National Oceanography Centre, Southampton ===
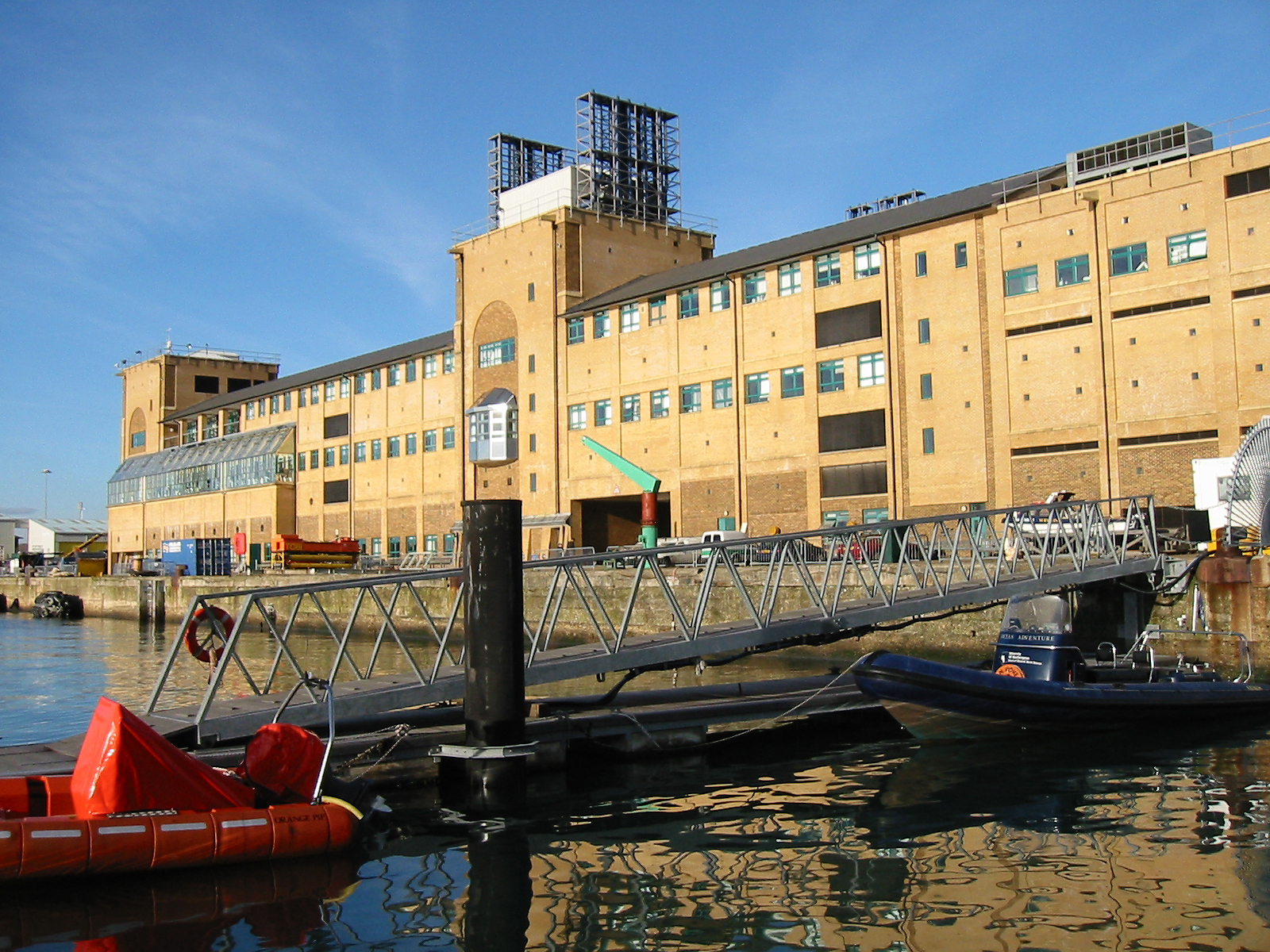
National Oceanography Centre, Southampton

The National Oceanography Centre, Southampton (NOCS) is located in Southampton Docks three miles south of the main university campus. The campus is home of the university's Ocean and Earth Sciences department and is also a campus of the Natural Environment Research Council's research institute, the National Oceanography Centre. Five of the National Oceanography Centre's research divisions are based on the campus.

Planning of the campus began in 1989 and was completed in 1994 due to cuts and uncertainties whether a national research centre could be successfully integrated with a university. It was opened in 1996 by Prince Philip, Duke of Edinburgh. The campus was also the base for the NERC purpose-built research vessels RRS James Cook and until recently the RRS Discovery and the RRS Charles Darwin.

=== University Hospital Southampton (UHS) ===
The university maintains a presence at Southampton General in partnership with the NHS trust operating the hospital. It is home to some operations of the Faculty of Medicine and the Faculty of Health Sciences, although these two faculties have bases on Highfield campus. As a teaching hospital, it is used by a range of undergraduate and postgraduate medical students, research academics and clinicians.

The university's involvement began in 1971, when it became the first to house a new school of medicine alongside the universities of Nottingham and Leicester, and currently extends to several operations and specific research centres.

=== Winchester School of Art ===
The Winchester School of Art, located in central Winchester, houses the university's arts and textiles courses that are part of the Faculty of Arts and Humanities. The school itself was established in the 1960s and was integrated into the University of Southampton in 1996. The campus contains the original school buildings from the 1960s, in addition to structures built when the merger occurred and in 1998 when the Textile Conservation Centre moved to the site from Hampton Court Palace. The centre remained with the school until its closure in 2009.

=== Malaysia Campus ===
The university opened its first international campus in Iskandar Puteri, Malaysia, as the University of Southampton Malaysia in October 2012. Located in the state of Johor near the southwestern tip of Malaysia, the campus is located within EduCity in Iskandar Puteri - a new city comprising universities and institutes of higher education, academia-industry action and R&D centres, as well as student accommodation, shared sports and recreational facilities.

The campus operates courses in engineering, it offers an Engineering foundation year programme and MEng programmes in Aeronautics and Astronautics, Mechanical Engineering and Electrical and Electronic Engineering. All programmes have been approved by the Malaysian Qualifications Agency (MQA) and the Board of Engineers Malaysia (BEM).

The split campus degree programmes take place in Malaysia for the first two years, with the final two years at Southampton. In 2016, the Malaysia Campus' first group of students graduated, along with the first PhD graduate.

As part of its expansion plans, the University of Southampton Malaysia has moved into its new 150,000sq ft estate in Eco Botanic City, Iskandar Puteri. The new campus is equipped with open learning spaces, lecture halls, an Aerospace Lab, a Design Studio, Business Experimental Labs, and a 12-terminal Bloomberg Suite. From the initial offerings of four Engineering programmes, UoSM has now grown to offer 20 programmes in the fields of Engineering, Business and Computer Science fields.

Currently, among all the British universities with a campus in Malaysia, UoSM is the second highest ranking UK university in Malaysia based on the recent QS world ranking 2027.

=== India Campus ===
In 2024, the university was awarded a licence to establish a new campus in Delhi NCR (Gurugram), India. Programmes are planned to begin in 2025. The university will offer BSc programmes in Computer Science, Business Management, Accounting and Finance, and Economics. MSc programmes will be offered in International Management and Finance.

=== Science Park ===
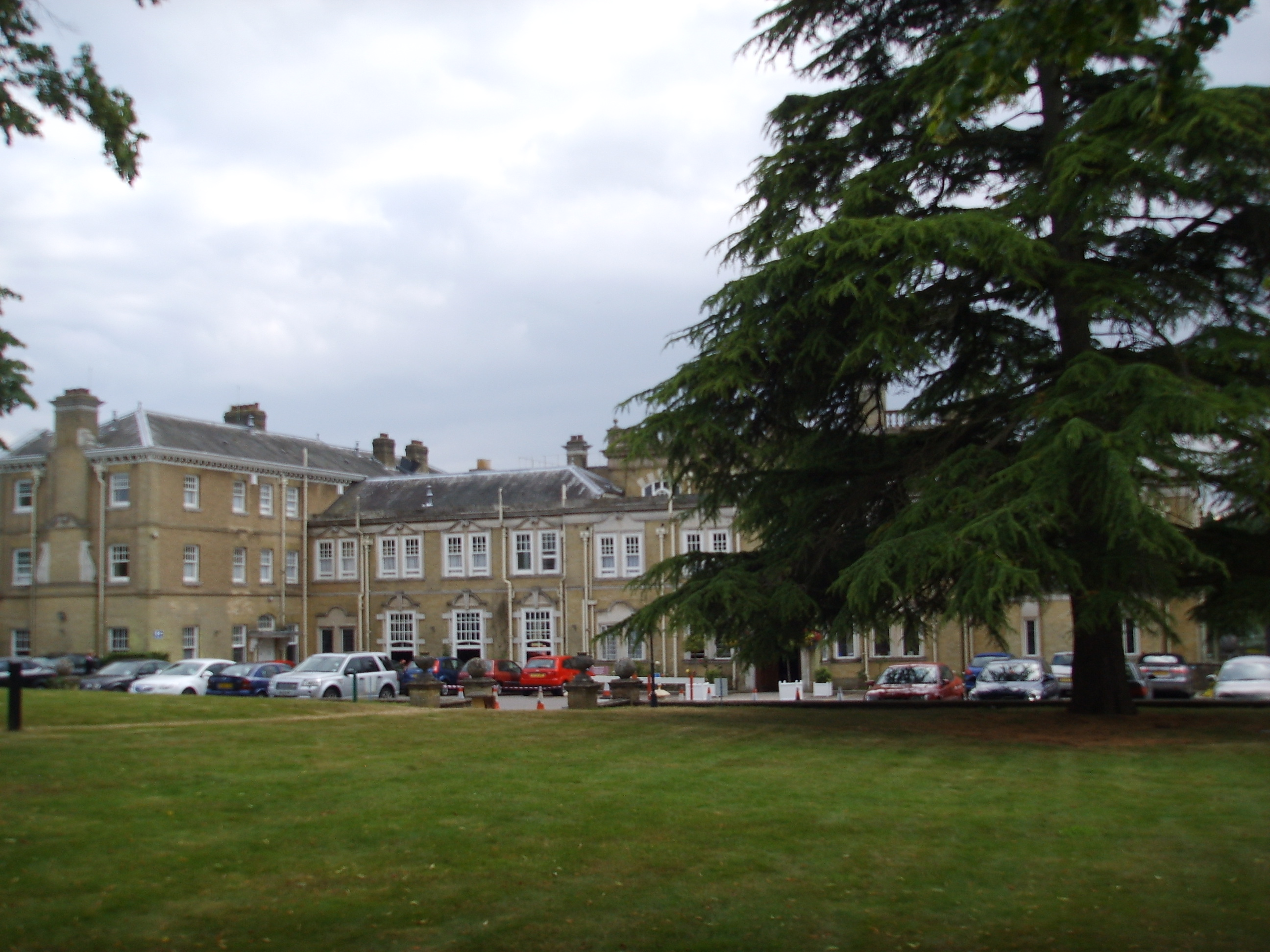
Chilworth Manor, part of the University of Southampton Science Park

The University of Southampton Science Park contains approximately 50 businesses connected to the university. Originally established in 1983 as Chilworth Science Park, named after the manor house that is now a luxury hotel and conference centre, the park houses business incubator units to help these companies. The companies occupying the park range in expertise and fields including oil and gas exploration, pharmaceuticals, nanotechnology and optoelectronics, with three of the twelve successful spin-out companies created since 2000 being floated on London's Alternative Investment Market (AIM) with a combined market capitalisation value of £160 million. The park was renamed in 2006.

Southampton Science Park hosts the Catalyst Programme, a five-month, fully funded accelerator supporting early-stage, innovation-led businesses with mentoring, workshops, and a collaborative environment, helping companies raise investment and create jobs.

=== Transport links ===
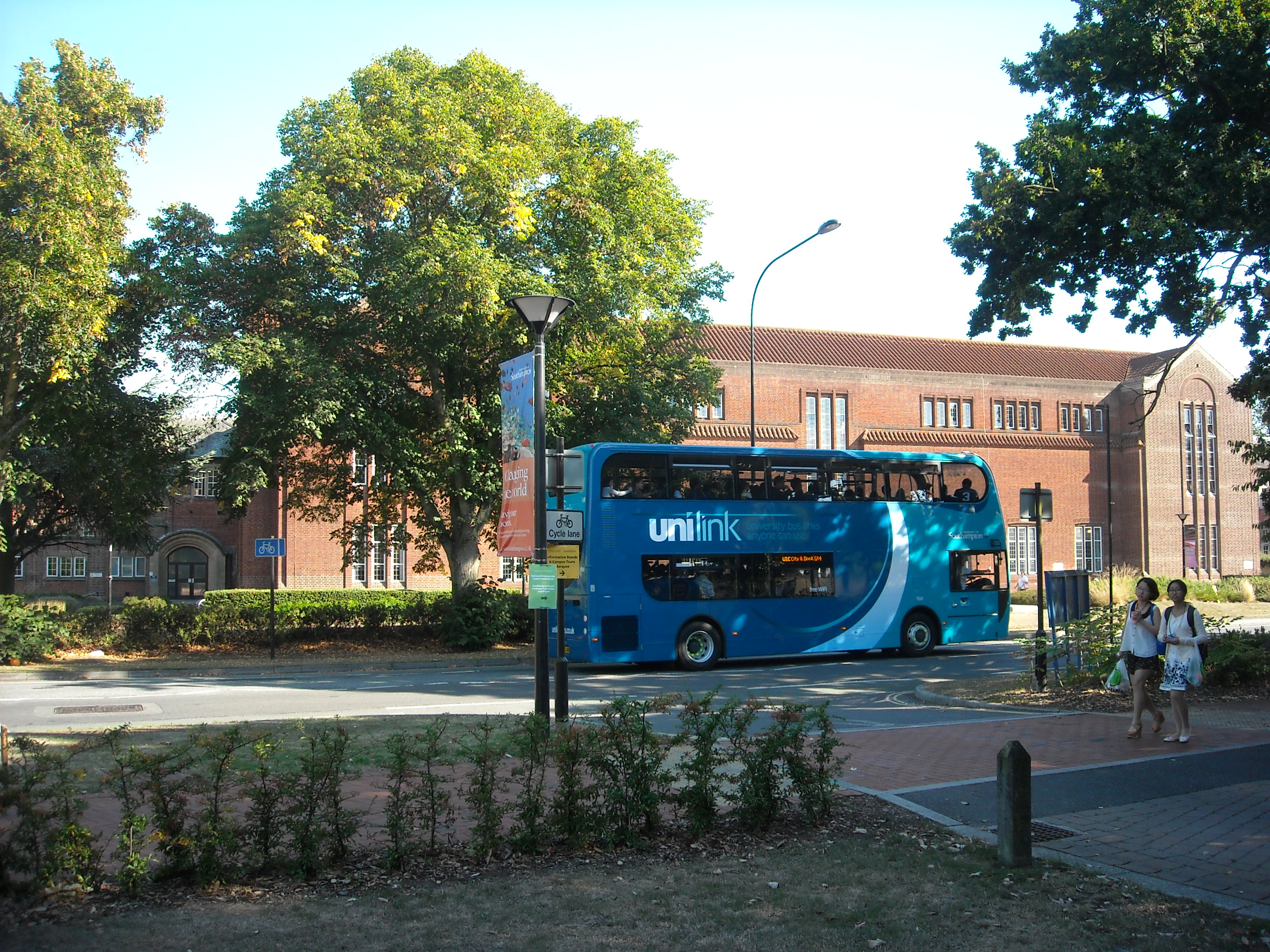
A Unilink double-decker bus passing through Highfield Campus

To connect the university's Southampton campuses, halls of residence, hospitals, and other important features of the city, the university operates the Unilink bus service for the benefit of the students, staff and the general public. The service is currently operated by local bus company Bluestar using the Unilink name. The service consists of four routes. The U1 runs between Southampton Airport and the National Oceanography Centre via Wessex Lane Halls, Highfield campus, Portswood, Southampton City Centre and WestQuay. The other regular routes, the U2 and the U6, run between the City Centre and Bassett Green and Southampton General Hospital respectively. Introduced in 2023, the U7 and U8 lines connect the Highfield campus to Winchester and Chilworth respectively while the final route, the U9, runs an infrequent service between Southampton General hospital and Townhill Park. Students who live in halls of residence provided by the university receive an annual bus pass, allowing them to use all Unilink services for free.

== Organisation ==
=== Governance ===
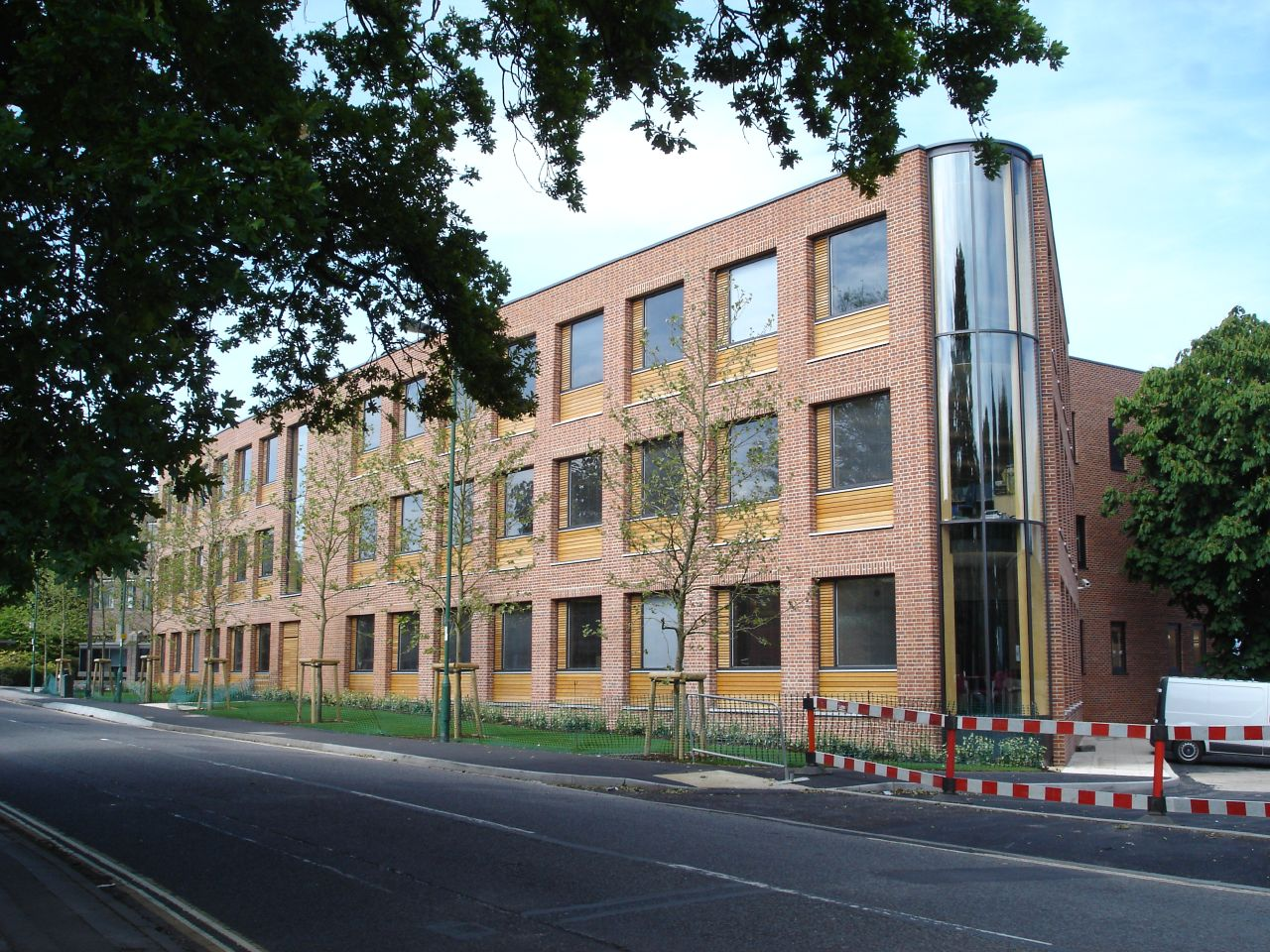
The George Thomas Student Services Building on Highfield Campus where the university management is located.

Responsibility for running the university is held formally by the Chancellor and led at the executive level by the Vice-Chancellor. The key bodies in the university governance structure are the Council and Senate.

The Council is the governing body of the university. It is ultimately responsible for the overall planning and management of the university. The council is also responsible for ensuring that the funding made available to the university by the Higher Education Funding Council for England is used as prescribed. The council is composed of members from 5 different classes, namely (1) officers; (2) eight lay members appointed by the council; (3) four members appointed by the Senate; (4) one member of the non-teaching staff; (5) the President of the Students' Union.

The Senate is the university's primary academic authority, with responsibilities which include the direction and regulation of education and examinations, the award of degrees, and the promotion of research. The Senate has approximately 65 members, including the Vice-Presidents, the Deans and representatives from the academic staff in each faculty and those administrative groups most closely associated with educational activities, and representatives of the Students' Union. The Senate is chaired by the Vice-Chancellor.

=== Faculties ===
The university comprises five faculties, each with a number of academic units. This current faculty structure came into effect in 2018, taking over from a previous structure consisting of eight faculties. The current faculty structure is:

- Faculty of Arts and Humanities
  - Humanities
  - Winchester School of Art
- Faculty of Engineering and Physical Sciences
  - Chemistry
  - Electronics and Computer Science
  - Engineering
  - Optoelectronics Research Centre
  - Physics and Astronomy
- Faculty of Environmental and Life Sciences
  - Biological Sciences
  - Geography and Environmental Science
  - Health Sciences (nursing, midwifery, allied health professionals)
  - Ocean and Earth Sciences
  - National Oceanography Centre
  - Psychology
- Faculty of Medicine
  - Southampton Medical School
  - Cancer Sciences
  - Clinical and Experimental Sciences
  - Healthcare Enterprise and Innovation
  - Human Development and Health
  - Primary Care, Population Sciences and Medical Education
- Faculty of Social Sciences
  - Economic, Social and Political Sciences
  - Southampton Statistical Sciences Research Institute
  - Mathematical Sciences
  - Southampton Business School
  - Southampton Education School
  - Southampton Law School

=== Affiliations ===
Southampton is a founding member of the Russell Group of research-intensive universities in Britain.

== Academic profile ==
=== Courses and subjects ===
Southampton awards a wide range of academic degrees spanning academic degrees for bachelor's in a variety of degrees and master's degrees as well as junior doctorates and higher doctorates. The postnominals awarded are the degree abbreviations used commonly among British universities. The university is part of the Engineering Doctorate scheme, for the award of Eng. D. degrees.

Short courses and professional development courses are run by many of the university's Academic Schools and Research Centres.

The university works closely with members of the Armed Forces. It provides professional military educators in the British Army to study for a Postgraduate Certificate in Education (PGCE). The university also works with the Royal Navy to provide training and qualifications towards Chartered Engineer status.

=== Admissions ===
UCAS Admission Statistics
	2025	2024	2023	2022	2021
Applications (Note: Main scheme applications, International and UK)	41,945	43,415	45,280	43,255	37,580
Accepted	6,280	5,695	5,235	5,075	5,315
Applications/Accepted Ratio	6.7	7.6	8.6	8.5	7.1
Overall Offer Rate (%)	79.5	77.0	73.0	71.1	65.9
↳ UK only (%) (Note: UK domiciled applicants)	78.4	76.6	71.9	69.5	64.1
Average Entry Tariff	—N/a	—N/a	145	159	156
↳ Top three exams (Note: The maximum tariff score for three exams is 168: the equivalent of A*A*A* at A-Level, 777 at HL for the IB Diploma Programme, or AAA at Advanced Higher)	—N/a	—N/a	143.7	150.4	147.2

HESA Student Body Composition (2024/25)
Domicile and Ethnicity	Total
British White (Note: Not be confused solely with White British)	44%
British Ethnic Minorities (Note: Includes those who indicate that they identify as Asian, Black, Mixed Heritage, Arab or any other ethnicity except White.)	21%
International EU	3%
International Non-EU	33%
Undergraduate Widening Participation Indicators
Female	49%
Independent School	14%
Low Participation Areas (Note: Calculated from the Polar4 measure, using Quintile1, in England and Wales. Calculated from the Scottish Index of Multiple Deprivation (SIMD) measure, using SIMD20, in Scotland.)	9%

In the 2024/25 academic year, the student body consisted of 25,785 students, composed of 17,645 undergraduates and 8,140 postgraduate students. The university is consistently designated as a 'high-tariff' institution by the Department for Education, with the average undergraduate entrant to the university in recent years amassing between 143–151 UCAS Tariff points in their top three pre-university qualifications – the equivalent of AAA to A*AA at A-Level. Based on 2022/23 HESA entry standards data published in domestic league tables, which include a broad range of qualifications beyond the top three exam grades, the average student at the University of Southampton achieved 159 points – the 25th highest in the country. The university gave offers of admission to 84.0% of its applicants in 2015, the sixth highest amongst the Russell Group.

According to the 2017 Times and Sunday Times Good University Guide, approximately 15% of Southampton's undergraduates come from independent schools. In the 2016–17 academic year, the university had a domicile breakdown of 72:7:21 of UK:EU:non-EU students respectively with a female to male ratio of 53:47. 60.5% of international students enrolled at the institution are from China, the highest proportion out of all mainstream universities in the UK.

=== Rankings and reputation ===
Rankings
National rankings
- Complete (2027): 15
- Guardian (2027): 18
- Times / Sunday Times (2027): 18

Global rankings
- ARWU (2026): 201–300
- QS (2027): 111=
- THE (2026): 129

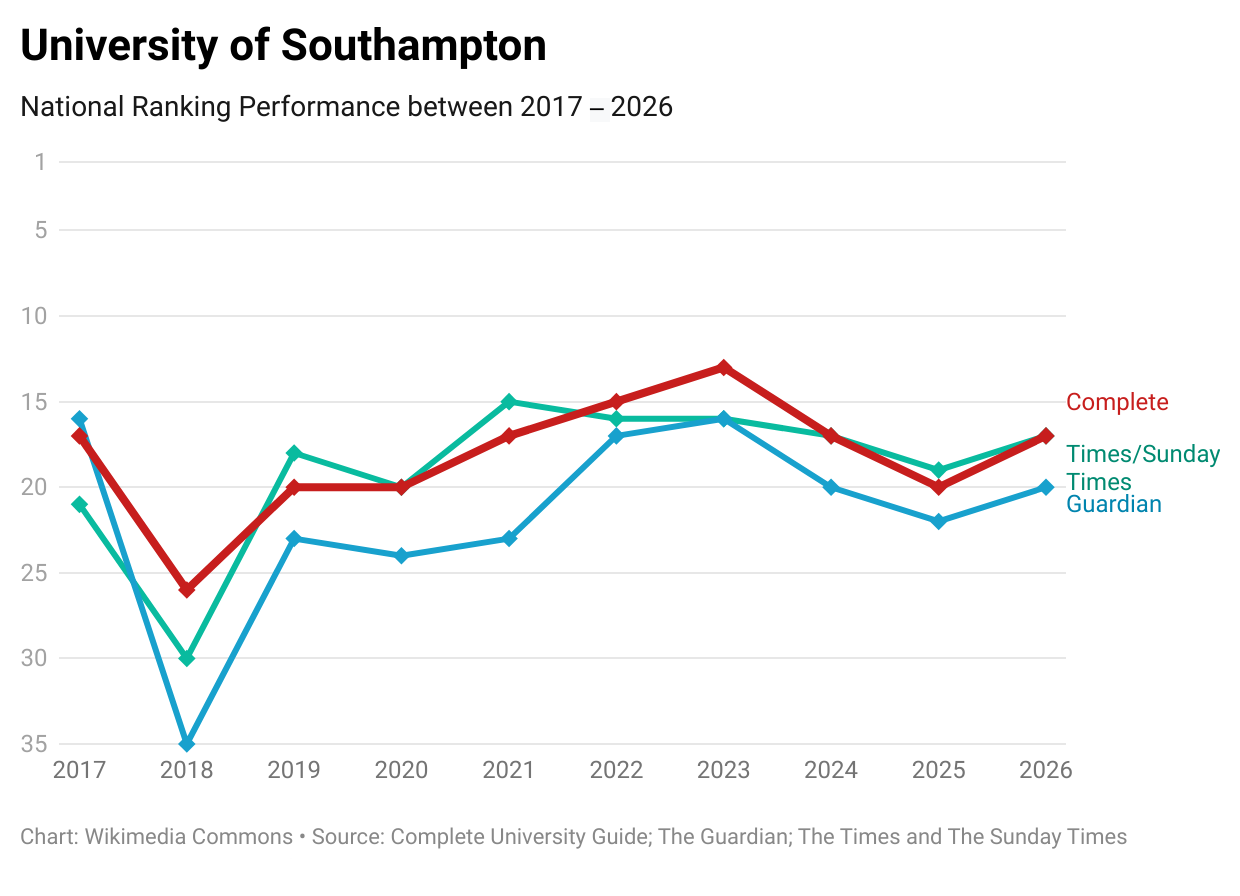
University of Southampton's national league table performance over the past ten years

In the 2025 international university rankings, Southampton ranked 151-200th (Academic Ranking of World Universities) and 115th (Times Higher Education World University Rankings). The 2022 Round University Ranking ranked Southampton 72nd globally, and the 2022 CWTS Leiden Ranking placed Southampton 85th worldwide. The 2021 U.S. News & World Report ranks Southampton 97th in the world and 11th in the UK.

Southampton was originally awarded Bronze ("provision is of satisfactory quality") in the 2017 Teaching Excellence Framework, a government assessment of the quality of undergraduate teaching in universities and other higher education providers in England. The Bronze award was appealed by the university, however it was rejected by the HEFCE in August 2017. In response, the university's Vice Chancellor, Christopher Snowden, claimed the exercise was "devoid of any meaningful assessment of teaching" and that "there are serious lessons to be learned if the TEF is to gain public confidence." Enrollment into the exercise was voluntary and institutions were made aware of the metrics used before agreeing to be assessed by the TEF. In January 2018, the university confirmed that it would re-enter the TEF believing that it would benefit from changed evaluations that would benefit Russell Group universities. In 2018, Southampton was awarded Silver by the Teaching Excellence Framework Panel. In the 2023 TEF assessment, the university maintained its overall Silver rating.

The Guardian ranked the university at number 1 in the UK for Civil Engineering and Electronic and Electrical Engineering in 2020.

In the 2021 Research Excellence Framework (REF), which assesses the quality of research in UK higher education institutions, Southampton is ranked 17th by GPA and 16th for research power (the grade point average score of a university, multiplied by the full-time equivalent number of researchers submitted).

=== Research ===
The university conducts research in most academic disciplines and is home to a number of notable research centres. Southampton has leading research centres in a number of disciplines, e.g. music, computer sciences, engineering or management sciences, and houses world-leading research institutions in fields as varied as oceanography and web science.

Within the university there are a number of research institutes and groups that aim to pool resources on a specific research area. Institutes or groups identified by the university of being of significant importance are marked in italics.

University of Southampton Research Institutes and Groups

Inter-Faculty

Name	Academic group	Foundation date
Centre for Banking, Finance and Sustainable Development	Southampton Business School; School of Social Sciences	
Centre for Complex Autonomous Systems Engineering	Faculty of Engineering and the Environment; Faculty of Physical and Applied Sciences; Institute for Life Sciences; National Oceanography Centre, Southampton	
Centre for Health Ethics and Law (HEAL)	Southampton Law School; Health Sciences; Medicine; Psychology; Geography and the Environment	November 2005
Centre for Operational Research, Management Science and Information Systems (CORMSIS)	Southampton Business School; Mathematics	
Institute of Criminal Justice Research	Southampton Law School; School of Social Sciences	1986
Institute for Life Sciences (IfLS)		September 2011

Faculty of Business, Law and Art

Name	Academic group	Foundation date
Centre for Law Ethics and Globalisation (LEAG)	Southampton Law School	April 2009
Centre for Risk Research	Southampton Business School	1990
Centre for Research in Accounting, Accountability and Governance (CRAAG)	Southampton Business School	
Centre for Strategic Innovation		
Entrepreneurship Research Group	Southampton Business School	
Finance and Banking Research Group	Southampton Business School	
Institute for Law and the Web (ILAWS)	Southampton Law School	2006
Institute of Maritime Law	Southampton Law School	1982
Marketing Research Group	Southampton Business School	
Organisational Behaviour and Human Resources Research Group	Southampton Business School	
Strategy and Innovation Research Group	Southampton Business School	
Winchester Centre for Global Futures in Art Design & Media	Winchester School of Art	

Faculty of Engineering and the Environment

Name	Academic group	Foundation date
Aerodynamics and Flight Mechanics Research Group	Engineering and the Environment	
Airbus Noise Technology Centre (ANTC)		November 2008
Astronautics Research Group	Engineering and the Environment	
Bioengineering Science Research Group	Engineering and the Environment	
Carbon Management Research Group	Engineering and the Environment	
Centre for Environmental Sciences	Engineering and the Environment	
Computational Engineering and Design Research Group	Engineering and the Environment	
DePuy International University Technology Partnership in Bioengineering Science		2000
Dynamics Research Group	Institute of Sound and Vibration Research	
Electro-Mechanical Engineering Research Group	Engineering and the Environment	
Energy and Climate Change Research Group	Engineering and the Environment	
Energy Technology Research Group	Engineering and the Environment	
Engineering Materials Research Group	Engineering and the Environment	
Fluid Dynamics and Acoustics Research Group	Institute of Sound and Vibration Research	
Fluid Structure Interactions Research Group	Engineering and the Environment	
Hearing and Balance Centre	Institute of Sound and Vibration Research	
Human Factors Research Unit (HFRU)	Institute of Sound and Vibration Research	1970s
Infrastructure Research Group	Engineering and the Environment	
Institute of Sound and Vibration Research (ISVR)		1963
Lloyd's Register Educational Trust University Technology Centre in Ship design for Enhanced Environmental Performance (LRET UTC)	Engineering and the Environment	
Microsoft Institute for High Performance Computing		November 2005
National Centre for Advanced Tribology (nCATS)		11 November 2009
Rolls-Royce University Technology Centre for Computational Engineering	Engineering and the Environment	
Rolls-Royce University Technology Centre in Gas Turbine Noise	Institute of Sound and Vibration Research	
Royal National Lifeboat Institution Advanced Technology Partnership on Maritime Engineering and Safety (RNLI ATP)	Engineering and the Environment	27 February 2001
Signal Processing and Control Group	Institute of Sound and Vibration Research	
Transportation Research Group (TRG)	Engineering and the Environment	1967
Waste Management Research Group	Engineering and the Environment	
Water and Environmental Engineering Research Group		

Faculty of Health Sciences

Name	Academic group	Foundation date
Cancer, Palliative and End of Life Care Research Group (CPELC)	Health Sciences	
Macmillan Survivorship Research Group	Health Sciences	2009
Organisation and Delivery of Care Research Group		
Rehabilitation and Health Technologies Research Group		

Faculty of Humanities

Name	Academic group	Foundation date
19th and Early 20th Century European Philosophy Research Group	Philosophy	
Analytic Aesthetics and the History of Aesthetics Research Group	Philosophy	
Archaeological Computing Research Group	Archaeology	1990s
Archaeological Prospection Services of Southampton (APSS)	Archaeology	2001
Centre for Applied Archaeological Analyses	Archaeology	1994
Centre for Applied Human Origins Research	Archaeology	
Centre for Applied Language Research (CALR)	Modern Languages	2003
Centre for the Archaeology of Human Origins	Archaeology	2000
Centre for Global Englishes		
Centre for Imperial and Post Colonial Studies	History	2006
Centre for Language, Linguistics and Area Studies (LLAS)	Modern Languages	2000
Centre for Maritime Archaeology	Archaeology	1995
Centre for Medieval and Renaissance Culture	Archaeology; English; History; Music	
Centre for Mexico – Southampton Collaboration (Mexsu)		
Centre for Modern and Contemporary Writing	English	
Centre for Transnational Studies	Film; Modern Languages	
Classical and Historical Archaeology Research Group	Archaeology	
Composition and Music Technology Research Group	Music	
Early Modern and Modern Philosophy Research Group	Philosophy	
Ethics and Practical Reason Research Group	Philosophy	
Languages South East	Modern Languages	April 2011
Maritime Archaeology Research Group	Archaeology; Centre for Maritime Archaeology	
Music Performance Research Group	Music	
Musicology and Ethnomusicology Research Group	Music	
Osteo-archaeology Research Group	Archaeology	
Parkes Institute for the Study of Jewish/non-Jewish Relations	English; History; Modern Languages	October 2000 (Institute); 1964 (Library donated)
Philosophy of Language, Philosophy of Mind and Epistemology Research Group	Philosophy	
Routes into Languages	Modern Languages	2006 (Initial programme); August 2013 (Southampton project)
Social Prehistory Research Group	Archaeology; Centre for the Archaeology of Human Origins	
Southampton Centre for Eighteenth Century Studies (SCECS)	English; History; Music philosophy	16 October 2008
Southampton Centre for Nineteenth Century Research	Archaeology; English; Film; History; Modern Languages; Music philosophy Social Sciences	September 2012 (Research Centre); 2010 (Research Group)
Southampton Ceramics Research Group	Archaeology	
Southampton Digital Humanities	Humanities	
Theory, Representation and Cultural Politics Research Group	Archaeology	
Wittgenstein and Early Analytic Philosophy Research Group	Philosophy	

Faculty of Medicine

Name	Academic group	Foundation date
Centre for Developmental Origins of Health and Disease (DOHaD)	Medicine	
Centre for Human Development, Stem Cells and Regeneration	Medicine; Institute for Life Sciences	
Centre for Respiratory Science	Medicine	
MRC Lifecourse Epidemiology Unit	Medicine	2010
NIHR Southampton Biomedical Research Centre in Nutrition	Southampton Centre for Biomedical Research; Medicine	1990s
NIHR Southampton Respiratory Biomedical Research Unit	Southampton Centre for Biomedical Research; Medicine	1980s
NIHR/Cancer Research UK Experimental Cancer Medicine Centre	Southampton Centre for Biomedical Research; Medicine	
NIHR/Wellcome Trust Clinical Research Facility	Southampton Centre for Biomedical Research; Medicine	
Shadow Cardiovascular Biomedical Research Unit	Southampton Centre for Biomedical Research; Medicine	
Shadow Musculoskeletal Biomedical Research Unit	Southampton Centre for Biomedical Research; Medicine	
Southampton Cancer Research UK Centre	Medicine	
Southampton Centre for Biomedical Research	Medicine	
Translational Immunology Partnership	Medicine; Institute for Life Sciences	
University of Southampton Clinical Trials Unit (In conjunction with NIHR and Cancer Research UK)	Southampton Centre for Biomedical Research; Medicine	November 2007

Faculty of Natural and Environmental Sciences

Name	Academic group	Foundation date
Biomedical Sciences Research Group	Centre for Biological Sciences; Institute for Life Sciences	
Centre for Marine Microsystems	Ocean and Earth Sciences; National Oceanography Centre, Southampton; School of Electronics and Computer Science	2008
Characterisation and Analytics Research Group	Chemistry	
Computational Systems Research Group	Chemistry	
Education Research Group	Chemistry	
Electrochemistry Research Group	Chemistry	
Environmental Biosciences Research Group	Centre for Biological Sciences	
Geochemistry Research Group	Ocean and Earth Sciences; National Oceanography Centre, Southampton	
Geology and Geophysics Research Group	Ocean and Earth Sciences; National Oceanography Centre, Southampton	
Magnetic Resonance Research Group	Chemistry	
Marine Biogeochemistry Research Group	Ocean and Earth Sciences; National Oceanography Centre, Southampton	
Marine Biology and Ecology Research Group	Ocean and Earth Sciences; National Oceanography Centre, Southampton; Institute for Life Sciences	
Molecular and Cellular Biosciences Research Group	Centre for Biological Sciences	
Molecular Assembly, Function and Structure Research Group	Chemistry	
Molecular Diagnostics and Therapeutics Research Group	Chemistry	
National Oceanography Centre, Southampton		
Palaeoceanography and Palaeclimate Research Group	Ocean and Earth Sciences; National Oceanography Centre, Southampton	
Physical Oceanography Research Group	Ocean and Earth Sciences; National Oceanography Centre, Southampton	
Research Facilities Research Group	Centre for Biological Sciences	
Southampton Marine and Maritime Institute		March 2012
Southampton Neurosciences Group (SoNG)	Institute for Life Sciences	2001

Faculty of Physical Sciences and Engineering

Name	Academic group	Foundation date
Academic Centre of Excellence in Cybersecurity	School of Electronics and Computer Science	1 July 2012
Adaptive Photonics Group	Quantum Light and Matter Research Group	
Advanced Fibre Technologies and Applications Research Group	Optoelectronics Research Centre	
Advanced Solid-state Sources Research Group	Optoelectronics Research Centre	
Agents, Interaction and Complexity Research Group (AIC)	School of Electronics and Computer Science	
Astronomy Research Group	Physics and Astronomy; STAG Research Centre	
Communications, Signal Processing and Control Research Group (CSPC)	School of Electronics and Computer Science	
Computational Nonlinear Optics Research Group	Optoelectronics Research Centre	
Distributed Optical Fibre Sensors	Optoelectronics Research Centre	
Electronic and Software Systems Research Group (ESS)	School of Electronics and Computer Science	
Electronics and Electrical Engineering Research Group (EEE)	School of Electronics and Computer Science	2011
EPrints	School of Electronics and Computer Science	
Fibre Bragg Gratings Research Group	Optoelectronics Research Centre	
Harvesting Energy Network	School of Electronics and Computer Science	
High Power Fibre Lasers Research Group	Optoelectronics Research Centre	
Hybrid Photonics Research Group	Quantum Light and Matter Research group	
Infrared Science and Technology Research Group	Optoelectronics Research Centre	
Institute for Complex Systems Simulation	School of Electronics and Computer Science	18 March 2009
Integrated Photonic Devices Research Group	Optoelectronics Research Centre	
The IT Innovation Centre	School of Electronics and Computer Science	
Laboratory for Inorganic Colloidal Nanocrystals	Quantum Light and Matter Research group	
Laser-Induced Forward Transfer Research Group	Optoelectronics Research Centre	
Magnetism and Superconductivity Research Group	Quantum Light and Matter Research group	
MailScanner	School of Electronics and Computer Science	
Microstructured Optical Fibres Research Centre	Optoelectronics Research Centre	
Nanomaterials Research Group	Quantum Light and Matter Research group	
Nanophotonics and Metamaterials Research Group	Optoelectronics Research Centre	
Nano Research Group	School of Electronics and Computer Science; Zepler Institute	
Nonlinear and Microstructured Optical Materials Research Group	Optoelectronics Research Centre	
Novel Glass and Fibre Research Group	Optoelectronics Research Centre	
Optical Biosensors and Biophotonics Research Group	Optoelectronics Research Centre	
Optical Fibre Communications Research Group	Optoelectronics Research Centre	
Optical Microfibre Devices and Sensors	Optoelectronics Research Centre	
Optical Parametric Oscillators Research Group	Optoelectronics Research Centre	
Optical Sensors and Instrumentation Research Group	Optoelectronics Research Centre	
Optoelectronics Research Centre		1989
The ORCHID Project	School of Electronics and Computer Science	
Pervasive Systems Centre	School of Electronics and Computer Science	
Photonic, Electronic and Plasmonic Microstructured Optical Fibres Research Group	Optoelectronics Research Centre	
Photonic Systems Circuits and Sensors Research Group	Optoelectronics Research Centre	
Physical Optics Research Group	Optoelectronics Research Centre	
Planar Optical Materials Research Group	Optoelectronics Research Centre	
Planar Waveguide and Slab Lasers Research Group	Optoelectronics Research Centre	
Power Photonics and Applications Research Group	Optoelectronics Research Centre	
Pulsed Fibre Lasers Research Group	Optoelectronics Research Centre	
Pulsed Laser Deposition Research Group	Optoelectronics Research Centre	
Quantum Control Group	Quantum Light and Matter Research Group	
Quantum Light and Matter Research Group	Physics and Astronomy	
Quantum Nanophysics and Matter Wave Interferometry Research Group	Quantum Light and Matter Research Group	
Scanning Near-field Optical Microscopy Research Group	Optoelectronics Research Centre	
Semiconductor Fibre Devices for Nonlinear Photonics Research Group	Optoelectronics Research Centre	
Silica Fibre Fabrication Research Group	Optoelectronics Research Centre	
Silica Photonics Research Group	Optoelectronics Research Centre	
Southampton High Energy Physics Theory Group	Physics and Astronomy	
Southampton Nanofabrication Centre	School of Electronics and Computer Science	
Space Environment Physics Group	Physics and Astronomy; Astronomy Group	
Synote	School of Electronics and Computer Science	
Telecommunications Devices and Sub-Systems Research Group	Optoelectronics Research Centre	
The Terahertz Laboratories Group	Quantum Light and Matter Research group	
Theory of Light Matter Coupling in Nanostructures Research Group	Quantum Light and Matter Research group	
Ultrafast Laser X-Ray Research Group	Optoelectronics Research Centre	
Vertical-external-cavity surface-emitting-laser Research Group	Quantum Light and Matter Research group	
Web and Internet Science Research Group	School of Electronics and Computer Science	
Web Science Doctoral Training Centre	School of Electronics and Computer Science	
Web Science Trust	School of Electronics and Computer Science	2006
Web Science Institute	School of Electronics and Computer Science	11 November 2013
Zepler Institute		12 September 2013

Faculty of Social, Human and Mathematical Sciences

Name	Academic group	Foundation date
Applied Mathematics Research Group	Mathematics	
Centre for Applications of Health Psychology (CAHP)	Psychology	
Centre for Applied Social Surveys	Southampton Statistical Sciences Research Institute (S3RI)	
Centre for Charitable Giving and Philanthropy		
Centre for Citizenship, Globalisation and Governance (C2G2)	Social Sciences	
Centre for Higher Education Management and Policy at Southampton (CHEMPaS)	School of Education	2004
Centre for Global Health, Population, Poverty and Policy (GHP3)	Social Sciences	
Centre for Research on Ageing	Social Sciences	
Centre for Research on Self and Identity (CRSI)	Psychology	
Centre for Sexual Health Research (CSHR)	Psychology	
Centre for Vision and Cognition (CVC)	Psychology	
Comparative Education, Citizenship and Political Socialisation Research Group	Southampton Education School; Leadership, School Improvement and Effectiveness (LSIE) Research Centre	
Design and Utilisation of Digital Technologies Research Group	Southampton Education School; Lifelong and Work-Related Learning (LaWRL) Research Centre	
Developmental Brain-Behaviour Unit (DBBU)	Psychology	November 2003
Earth Surface Dynamics Research Group	Geography and the Environment	
Economy, Society and Space Research Group	Geography and the Environment	
Educational and Career Decision-making Research Group	Southampton Education School; Lifelong and Work-Related Learning (LaWRL) Research Centre	
Educational Leadership, Management and Administration Research Group	Southampton Education School; Leadership, School Improvement and Effectiveness (LSIE) Research Centre	
Emotion and Personality Bio-behavioural Laboratory	Psychology	July 2011
ESRC Care Lifecycle Research Programme	Social Sciences	April 2010 – 2015
ESRC Centre for Population Change (CPC)		January 2009
ESRC National Centre for Research Methods (NCRM)		April 2004
ESRC Third Sector Research Centre (TSRC)		September 2008
Experimental Psychopathology Laboratory (EPL)	Psychology	
GeoData Institute	Geography and the Environment	1984
Global Environment Change and Earth Observation Research Group	Geography and the Environment	
Higher Education Research Group	Southampton Education School	
Inclusion and Special Education Research Group	Southampton Education School; Social Justice and Inclusive Education (SJIE) Research Centre	
International Centre for Child Wellbeing		
Internationalisation of HE Special Interest Group	Southampton Education School	
Language and Literacy in Education Research Group	Southampton Education School; Social Justice and Inclusive Education (SJIE) Research Centre	
Leadership, School Improvement and Effectiveness (LSIE) Research Centre	Southampton Education School	
Lifelong and Work-Related Learning (LaWRL) Research Centre	Southampton Education School	
Marketing and Marketisation in Education Research Group	Southampton Education School; Leadership, School Improvement and Effectiveness (LSIE) Research Centre	
Mathematics Education Special Interest Group	Southampton Education School; Mathematics and Science Education (MaSE) Research Centre	Early 1970s
Mathematics and Science Education (MaSE) Research Centre	Southampton Education School	
Operational Research Group	Mathematics	
Palaeoenvironmental Laboratory at the University of Southampton (PLUS)	Geography and the Environment	
Population, Health and Wellbeing Research Group (PHeW)	Geography and the Environment	
Pure Mathematics Research Group	Mathematics	
Quantitative Methodologies Special Interest Group	Southampton Education School	
Race and Ethnicity Special Interest Group	Southampton Education School	
Research on SEN Group	Southampton Education School; Social Justice and Inclusive Education (SJIE) Research Centre	
Research in Teacher Education (RITE) Special Interest Group	Southampton Education School	
School Improvement and Effectiveness Research Group	Southampton Education School; Leadership, School Improvement and Effectiveness (LSIE) Research Centre	
Science Education Special Interest Group	Southampton Education School; Mathematics and Science Education (MaSE) Research Centre	
Social Justice and Inclusive Education (SJIE) Research Centre	Southampton Education School	
South Asian Communities (SAC) Special Interest Group	Southampton Education School	
Southampton Institute of Mathematical Modelling (SIMM)	Mathematics	
Southampton Practice Research Initiative Network Group (SPRING)	Social Sciences	2007
Southampton Statistical Sciences Research Institute (S3RI)		2000s
Southampton Theory Astrophysics and Gravity Research Centre (STAG)		
Statistics Research Group	Mathematics; Southampton Statistical Sciences Research Institute (S3RI)	
Teacher Professional Development and Effectiveness	Southampton Education School; Leadership, School Improvement and Effectiveness (LSIE) Research Centre	
Teaching and learning through the life-course Research Group	Southampton Education School; Lifelong and Work-Related Learning (LaWRL) Research Centre	
Work Futures Research Centre	Social Sciences	
Work-related and Workplace Learning Research Group	Southampton Education School; Lifelong and Work-Related Learning (LaWRL) Research Centre	

==== Institute of Sound and Vibration Research ====
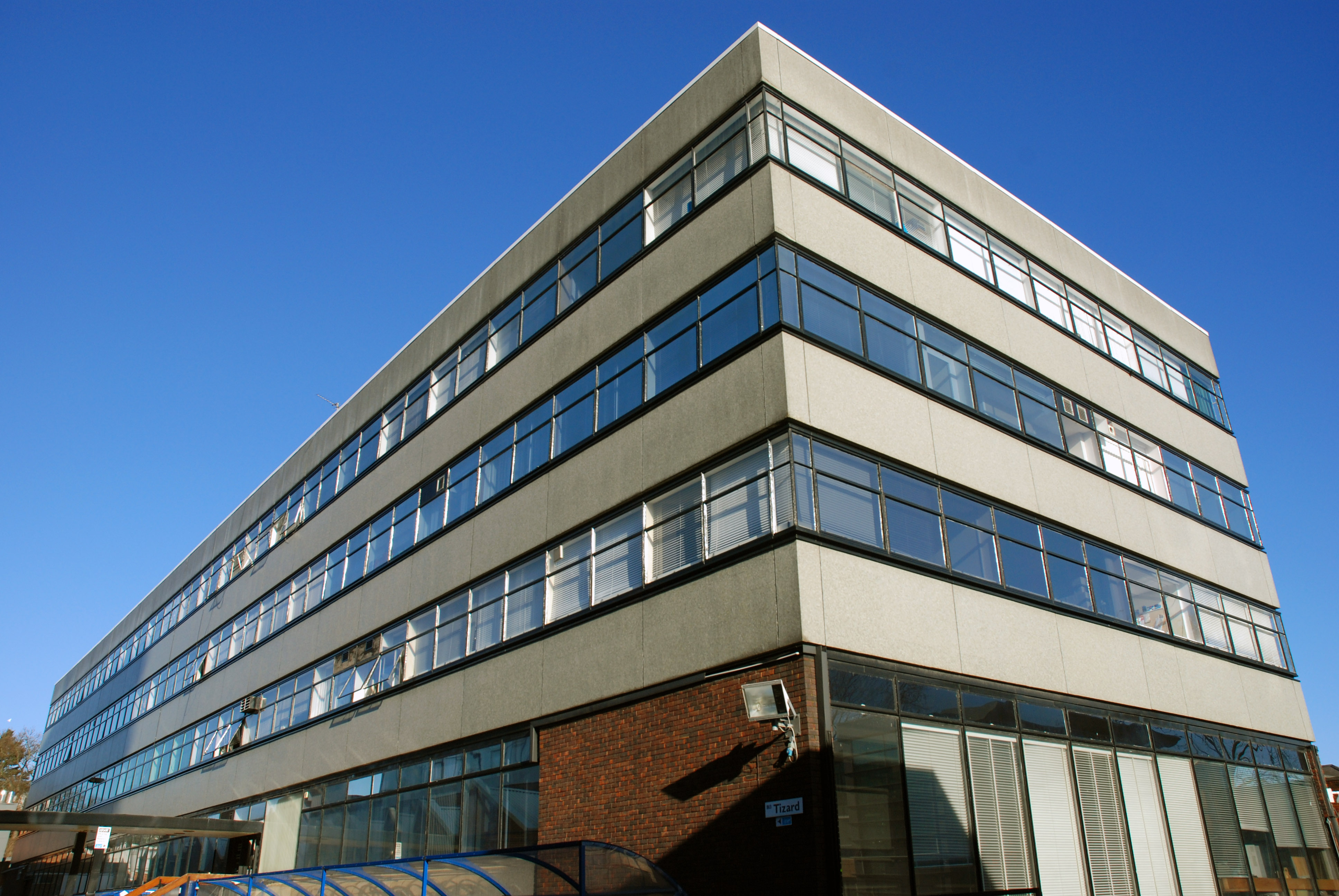
Institute of Sound and Vibration Research Building

The Institute of Sound and Vibration Research (ISVR), is an acoustical research institute which is part of the University of Southampton. Founded in 1963, it has been awarded a 2006 Queen's Anniversary Prize for Higher and Further Education.

ISVR is divided into four distinct groups of research:

- The Dynamics Group, (specialised in the modelling, measurement and control of structural vibrations).
- The Fluid Dynamics and Acoustics Group (including the Rolls-Royce University Technology Centre in Gas Turbine Noise) specialised in three fields which are aero-acoustics of aircraft engines, ultrasonics and underwater acoustics, noise source imaging and virtual acoustics.
- The Human Sciences Group (including the Hearing and Balance Centre and the Human Factors Research Unit) specialises in the human response to sound and vibration.
- The Signal Processing and Control Group, which specialises in acoustics, dynamics, audiology and human sciences and as a basis for control of sound and vibration.

ISVR offers a number of Undergraduate and Postgraduate degree programmes in acoustical engineering, acoustics & music and audiology.

=== EPrints ===
The School of Electronics and Computer Science created the first archiving software (EPrints) to publish its research freely available on the Web. This software is used throughout the university and as an archiving system for many different institutions around the world.

=== Libraries ===
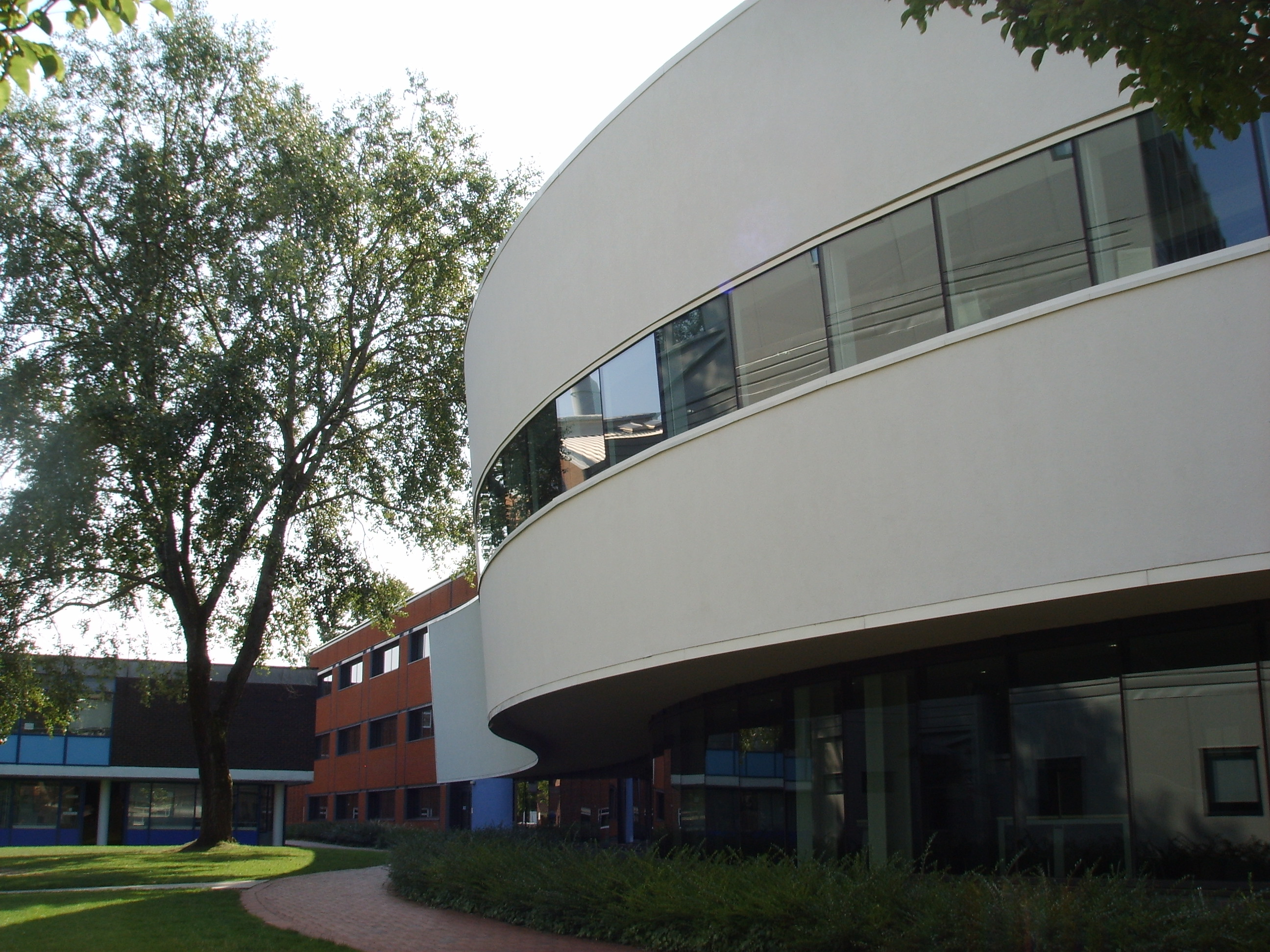
Exterior of the 2005 extension to the Hartley Library

The University of Southampton Library is located on four sites across Southampton and Winchester: the Hartley Library on the University’s main Highfield Campus, the Health Services Library at the Southampton General Hospital, the National Oceanographic Library at the National Oceanography Centre and Winchester School of Art Library at the Winchester Campus. The Hartley Library, which takes its name from its Victorian benefactor Henry Robinson Hartley, can trace its presence at the heart of Highfield campus back to 1914. The building has since been expanded, with the iconic entrance designed in part by Sir Giles Gilbert Scott, famous for the red telephone box and Battersea Power Station.

A research library, it is home to just under 1 million printed books, 1.6 million e-books, 150,000 e-journals as well as over 2,000 study spaces and extensive digital collections. Within its archives and collections are the Wellington, Palmerston and Mountbatten Papers, the Parkes Library of Jewish/non-Jewish relations and a Divina Commedia Brescia edition of 1487.

In addition, there is an Artists’ Book Collection, University Art Collection, and a Knitting Reference Library.

=== Arts ===
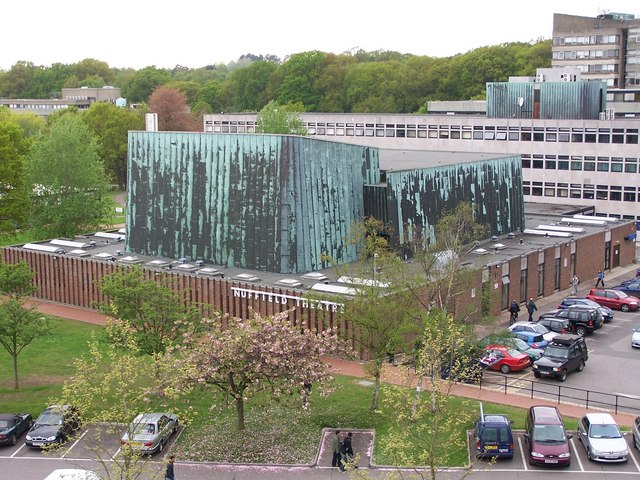
The Nuffield Theatre, Southampton

The university's main Highfield campus is home to three main arts venues supported and funded by the university and Arts Council England. The Nuffield Theatre opened in 1963 with construction funded by a grant from the Nuffield Foundation of £130,000 (£2,450,000 in 2013). The building was designed by Sir Basil Spence as part of his campus masterplan with additional direction provided by Sir Richard Southern. The theatre consists of a 480-seat auditorium, that also served as the principal lecture theatre at the time of construction, as well as additional lecture theatres and adjacent Kitchen bar. The theatre went into administration in May 2020 and permanent closure was announced in July 2020.

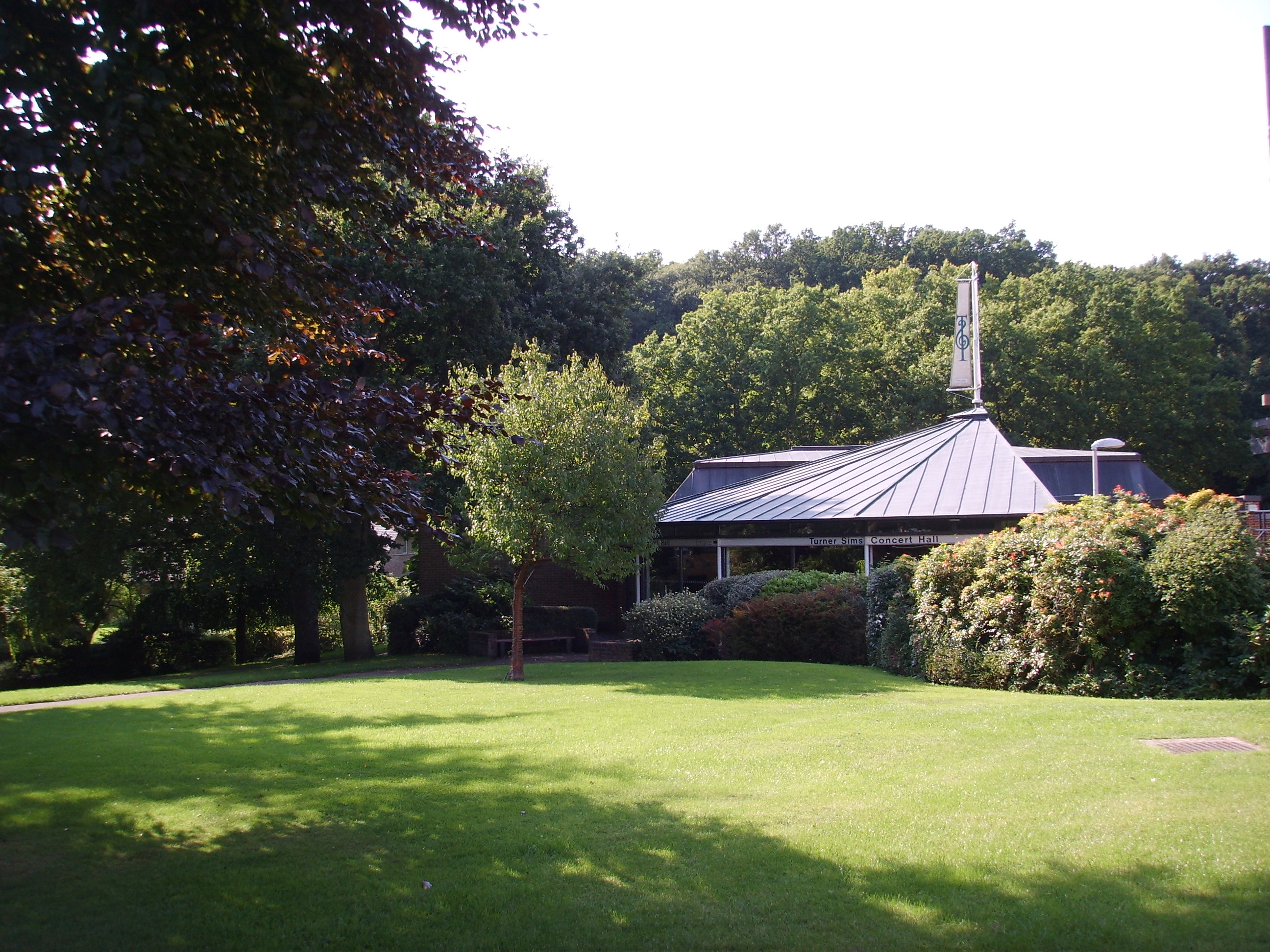
The Turner Sims Concert Hall on Highfield Campus.

The Turner Sims Concert Hall was added to the art provision in October 1974 following a £30,000 (£460,000 in 2012) donation from Margaret Grassam Sims in 1967. It was made to provide a venue specifically for music following difficulties in gaining space in the Nuffield Theatre and due to acoustical differences with the spaces. The new space has a single auditorium, designed by the university's Institute of Sound and Vibration Research with musical performances in mind, with a flat space at the bottom so it could be used for exams.

The final of the three Art Council supported venues on campus is the John Hansard Gallery. The gallery was opened on 22 September 1980 but is housed in a building that previously housed a tidal model of Southampton Water between 1957 and 1978. It took over responsibility from a photographic gallery, a gallery in the Nuffield Theatre and one located on Boldrewood campus. It houses various exhibitions in contemporary art and is due to move to new premises in Guildhall Square in c.2015.

In addition, the western half of Highfield campus contain several 20th-century sculptures by Barbara Hepworth, Justin Knowles, Nick Pope and John Edwards.

== Student life ==
=== Students' Union ===
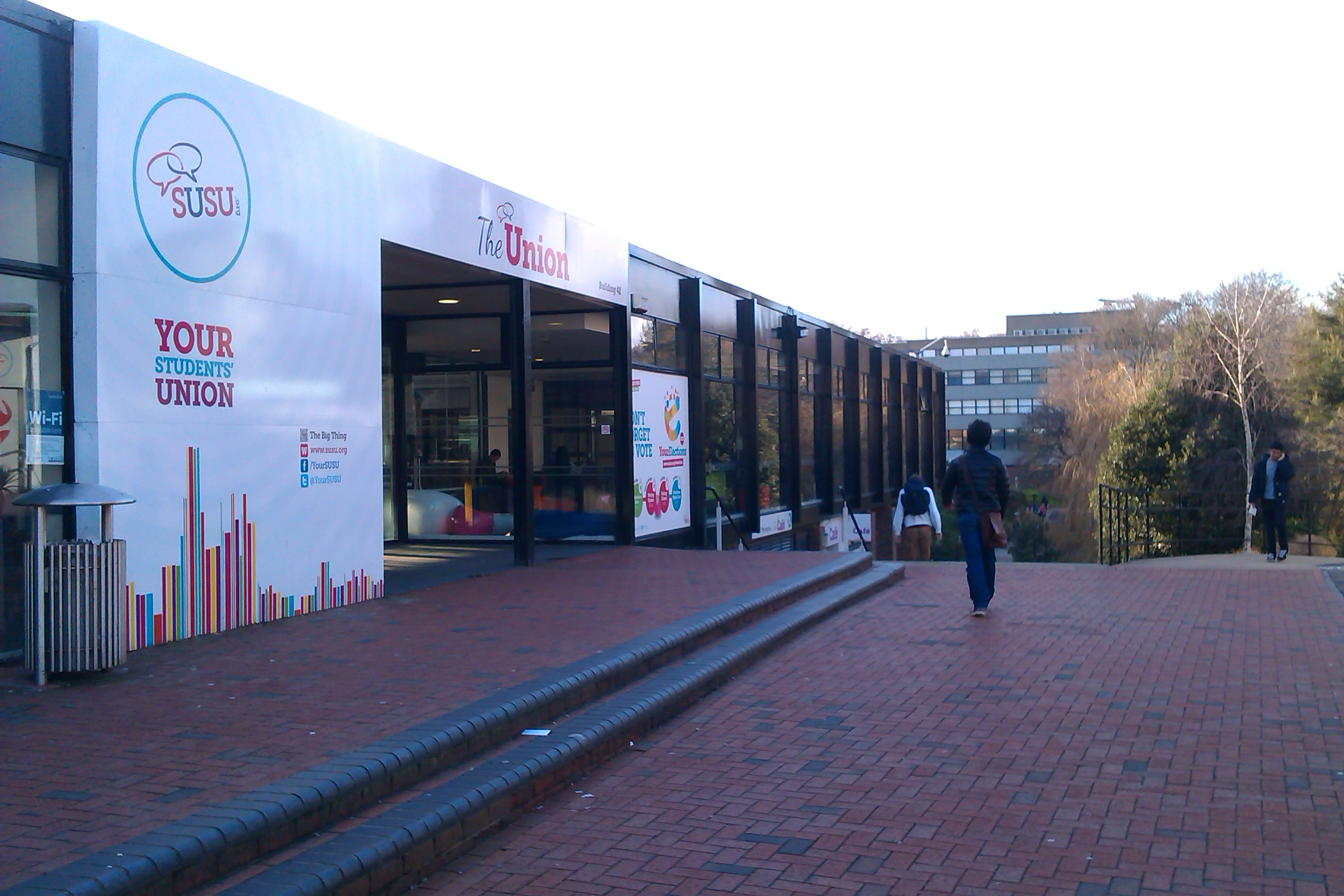
The Students' Union Building on Highfield Campus

The University of Southampton Students' Union (SUSU) is the university students' union and has a range of facilities located on the Highfield campus and on the Winchester School of Art campus. At Highfield the union is sited in three buildings opposite the Hartley Library. The main building (Building 42) was built in the 1960s as part of the Basil Spence masterplan. The building was also extensively renovated in 2002 leading to the creation of two new Bars and 'The Cube' multi-functional space. The West Building dates back to the 1940s in a red brick style, complementing the Hartley Library opposite. This originally held all of the Union's activities until the construction of the current Union. At present the building hosts the pub 'The Stags Head'. The newest building was built during the mid-1990s which includes the union shop and other retail stores.

The union operates four media outlets. Surge Radio, broadcasts from new studios in the main union building over the internet. Internet television station SUSUtv broadcasts a wide range of programmes live and on demand through their website. The student newspaper Wessex Scene is published once every three weeks. The Edge entertainment magazine began life as an insert of the Wessex Scene in 1995 before growing to become a full publication and online presence in 2011.

=== Halls of residence ===
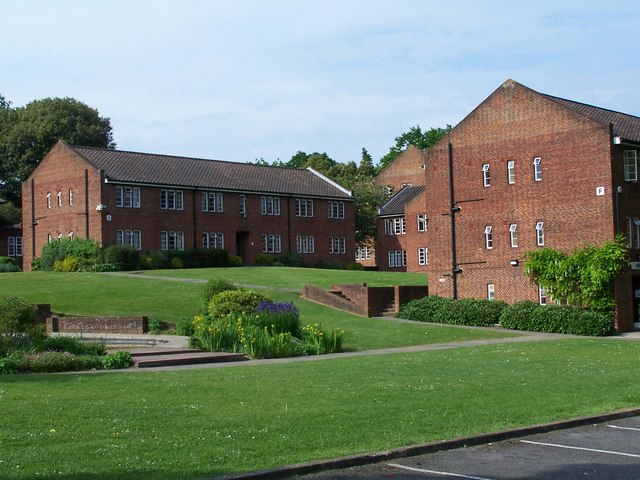
Old block of Glen Eyre halls of residence

The university provides accommodation for all first-year students who require it and places in residences are available for international and MSc students. Accommodation may be catered, self-catered, have en-suite facilities, a sink in the room, or access to communal bathroom facilities. Each hall has a Junior Common Room (JCR) committee that is responsible for the running of social events and representing the residents to the students union and the university via the Students union JCR officer.

The university's accommodation exists around two large complexes of halls and some other small halls located around the city. These are:

- Glen Eyre Complex: The complex lies less than half a mile to the north of Highfield Campus and houses approximately 2,000 students. The complex consists of several building sets, designed over the years and arranged either around the central landscaped garden – the oldest buildings, Richard Newitt Courts are separated into blocks A-G and are closest to the Glen Bar, students in these blocks have very small flats (between 4 and 6 to a kitchen with usually more than one bathroom). Old Terrace and New Terrace are close to the site's entrance, New Terrace has ensuite rooms. Chancellors' courts, consisting of Selbourne, Jellicoe and Roll courts are the most modern blocks in the accommodation with Brunei house, the most basic of accommodations, on the outskirts. Located on the south side of Glen Eyre Road on the periphery of the site are Chamberlain Halls, which share most things with the main Glen Eyre site. This site consists of Hartley Grove, South Hill, Beechmount House and the Chamberlain blocks. All Glen Eyre Halls are self-catered at present.
- Wessex Lane Halls: Located in Swaythling approximately one mile east of the Highfield Campus. The complex provides accommodation for over 1,800 students and currently comprises two halls of residence: Montefiore and Connaught. Connaught Halls are fully catered. The complex also features South Stoneham House, a period building constructed in 1708.
- City Gateway Hall: Located in Swaythling one mile north-east of the Highfield Campus at the intersection of two major roads. Opened in September 2015, the landmark building was included in the runners-up list of the 2015 Carbuncle Cup. Featuring a 15-story elliptical tower and two adjoining six-story rectangular accommodation blocks the hall provides accommodation for up to 375 students.
- Mayflower Halls: Located in the city centre within the city's 'Cultural Quarter', and two minutes' walk away from Southampton Central railway station. The hall opened at the start of the 2014/2015 academic year, and houses over 1,100 students in a mix of rooms. It includes a gym which is available to both residents and the public.
- Archers Road: Lying two miles south of Highfield and housing 500 students, Archers Road compromises two halls on separate sites. The two halls, Gateley and Romero, are all self-contained and self-catered but share a reception and other community facilities.
- Highfield Halls: Located adjacent to Avenue Campus and half a mile from Highfield campus. Highfield Halls comprises Aubrey and Wolfe houses and both have on-site catering. The site is also used as a University conference facility during the summer months when vacated.
- Gower Building: Gower is divided into two sections: east and west. Gower east contains a small number of self-contained apartments located above other university amenities, mainly used by mature and postgraduate students. Gower west contains a learning space for Electronics and Computer Science undergraduate students.
- Erasmus Park: Located in Winchester, this hall houses around 400 students studying at the Winchester School of Art.
- Riverside Way: Located in Winchester in close proximity to Erasmus Park. This is a private halls site but the university does have an agreement to allocate some students there.

=== Healthcare ===
The University Health Service is an NHS GP practice located on the main Highfield campus, with over 20,000 patients as of December 2021 working from Building 48 between the Physics & Maths Buildings.

=== Sports ===
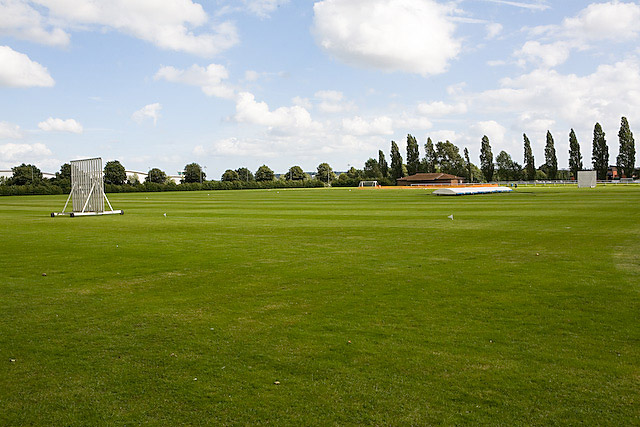
Wide Lane Sports Ground

The university's Sport and Wellbeing department runs the majority of the sports facilities on campus which are based predominately at two locations: the Jubilee Sports Centre and Wide Lane Sports Ground. The Jubilee Sports Centre, opened in 2004 at a cost of £8.5 million, is located on the Highfield Campus and contains a six-lane 25-metre swimming pool, 160 workstation gym and an eight-court sports hall. Wide Lane meanwhile is located nearby in Eastleigh and was refurbished at cost of £4.3 million in 2007. The 73-acre (30 ha) complex includes flood-lit synthetic turf and grass pitches, tennis courts, a pavilion and a 'Team Southampton' Gym. The university also runs facilities at the Avenue Campus, National Oceanography Centre, the Watersports Centre on the River Itchen and at Glen Eyre and Wessex Lane halls while there is another sports hall, squash courts, martial arts studio and bouldering wall located within the Students' Union.

The university competes in numerous sports in the BUCS South East Conference (after switching from the Western Conference in 2009). A number of elite athletes are supported by the SportsRec through sports bursaries and the UK Government's Talented Athlete Scholarship Scheme (TASS).

The University Athletic Union was formally established on 29 November 1929, by the University College council. Versions of the union had existed previously to which many clubs such as Cricket, Association Football, Rugby, Boxing, Gymnastics, Tennis and Boat clubs (all formed before the turn of the 20th century) were members.

==== Mustangs Baseball Club ====
The Southampton Mustangs Baseball Club was founded in 1997. In the early years, the club participated in mainly friendly games against other British university baseball teams, as no formal university league was in existence. Starting in 1998, the Mustangs started to host a university baseball tournament – inviting other teams including Oxford, Cambridge, Portsmouth, Royal Holloway, and Norwich. In 2004 the Mustangs entered into the national adult baseball leagues run by the British Baseball Federation (BBF). The club entered in the lowest division, but after a few years of consolidation, the Mustangs have worked their way up from the lower leagues in the BBF to play in the top-tier league of British baseball, the British National Baseball League (NBL), in the 2010 season.

==== National student championships ====
Throughout its history the university has had a number of successful teams in National student championships.

National student champions from the University of Southampton

Year	Team (men's)	Team (women's)	Team (mixed)
1936		Tennis	
1958	Basketball	Badminton	
1966	Cricket; Squash		
1968	Cricket; Table tennis		
1969	Cricket; Table tennis	Squash	Rifle shooting
1970	Cricket; Table tennis	Hockey	Rifle shooting
1971	Table tennis		
1972			Rifle shooting
1974		Tennis; Trampolining	Rifle shooting
1975		Badminton; Tennis	
1976	Ten pin bowling	Badminton	
1976		Squash	
1977		Badminton; Swimming	
1979	Squash; Trampolining	Lacrosse; Ten pin bowling	
1980	Squash; Volleyball	Lacrosse	
1981	Volleyball		
1982		Fencing	
1983	Volleyball		
1984	Archery		
1984	Weight lifting		
1985	Archery; 5-a-side	Volleyball	
1986	5-a-side	Volleyball	
1991	Archery; 5-a-side		
1992	Archery		
1995		Rowing	
2000	Windsurf		
2001	Windsurf		
2002			Rifle shooting
2004			Rifle shooting
2005			Rifle shooting
2006		Rifle shooting	Rifle shooting
2007			Rifle shooting
2008		Rifle shooting	Rifle shooting
2009		Rifle shooting	
2010			Rifle shooting
2011			Rifle shooting
2012		Rifle shooting	Rifle shooting
2015			Rifle shooting
2019			Rifle shooting

== Notable people ==
=== Alumni ===
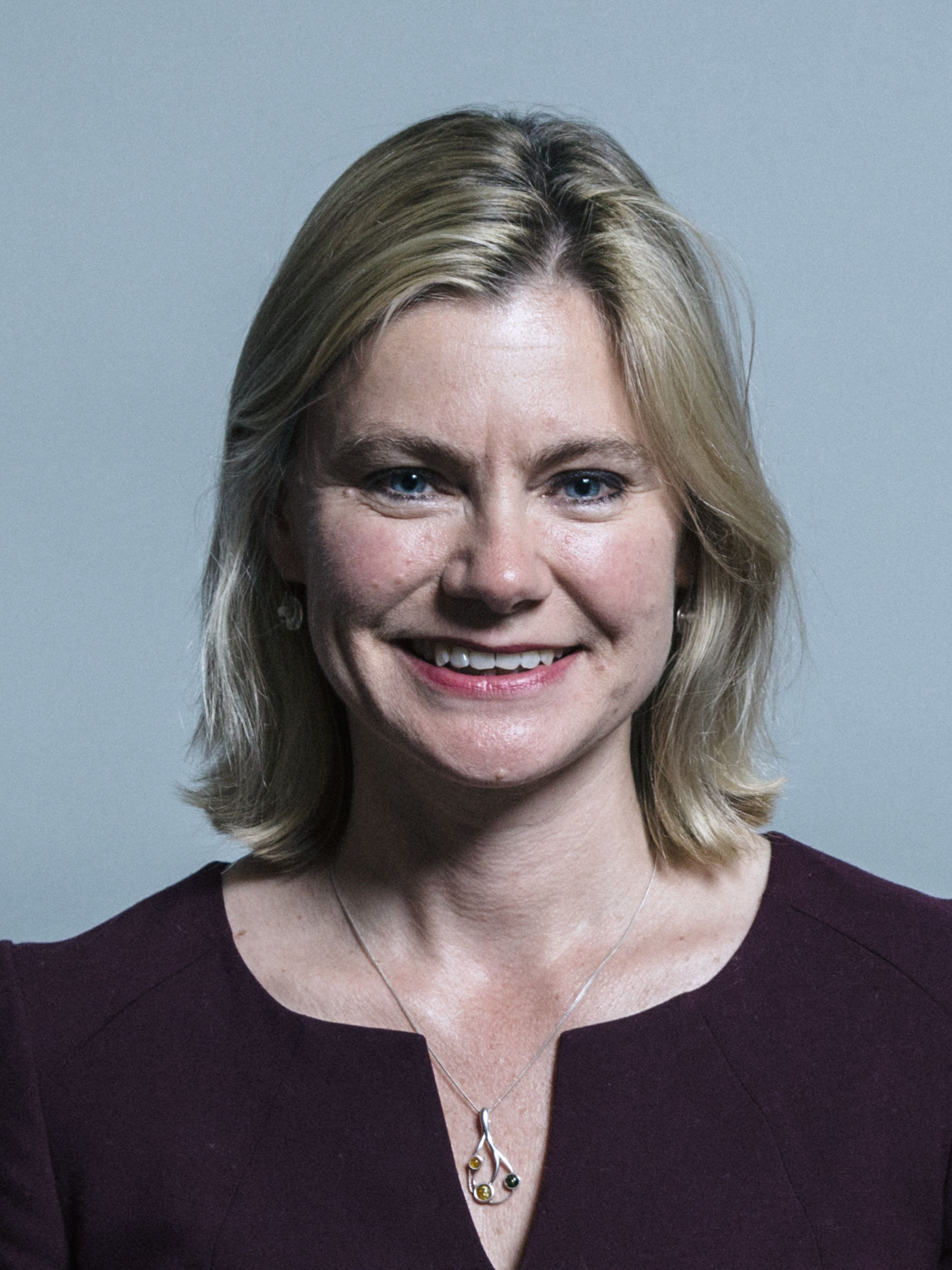
Justine Greening, former MP and current joint Chancellor of the University

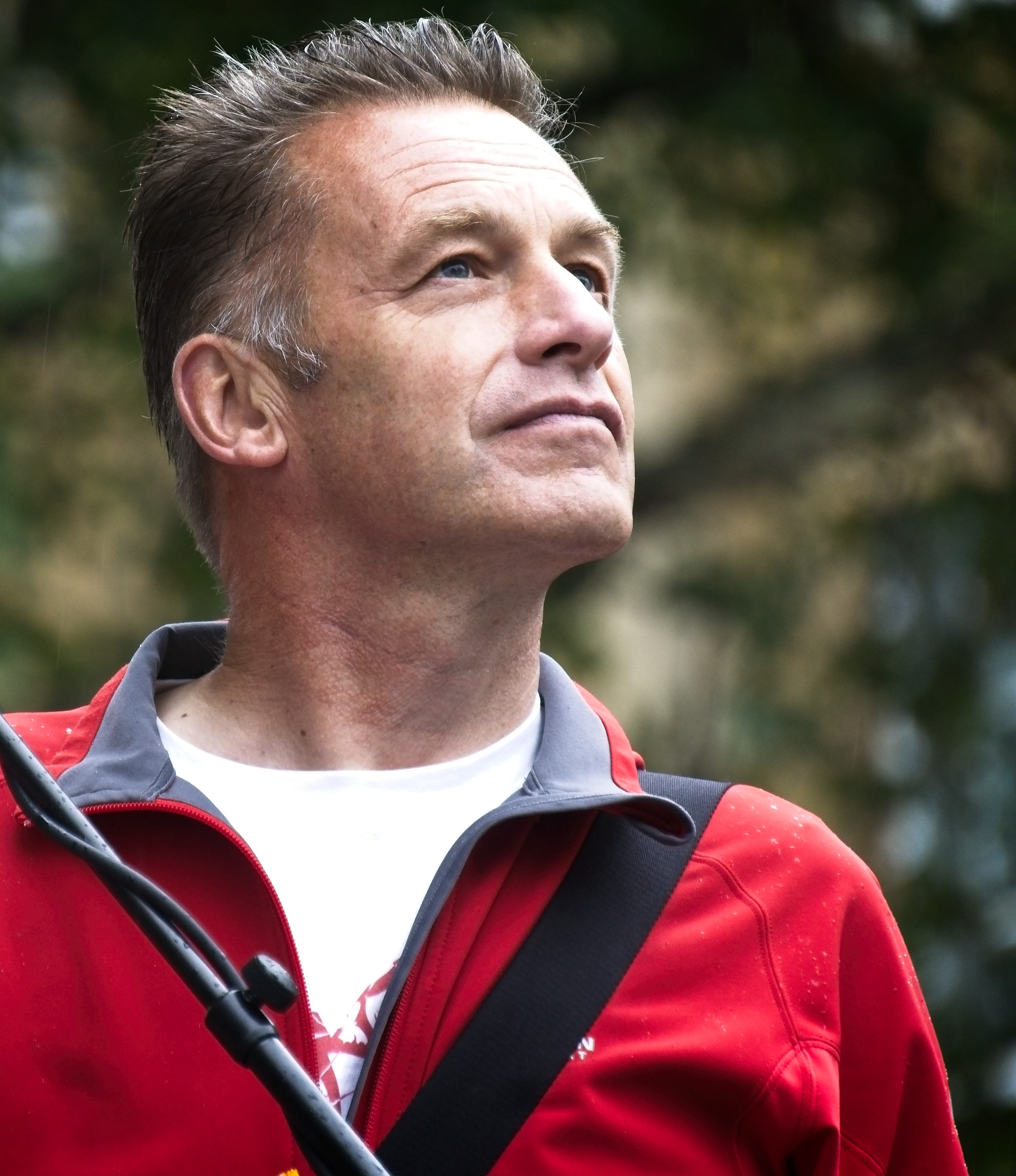
Chris Packham, naturalist

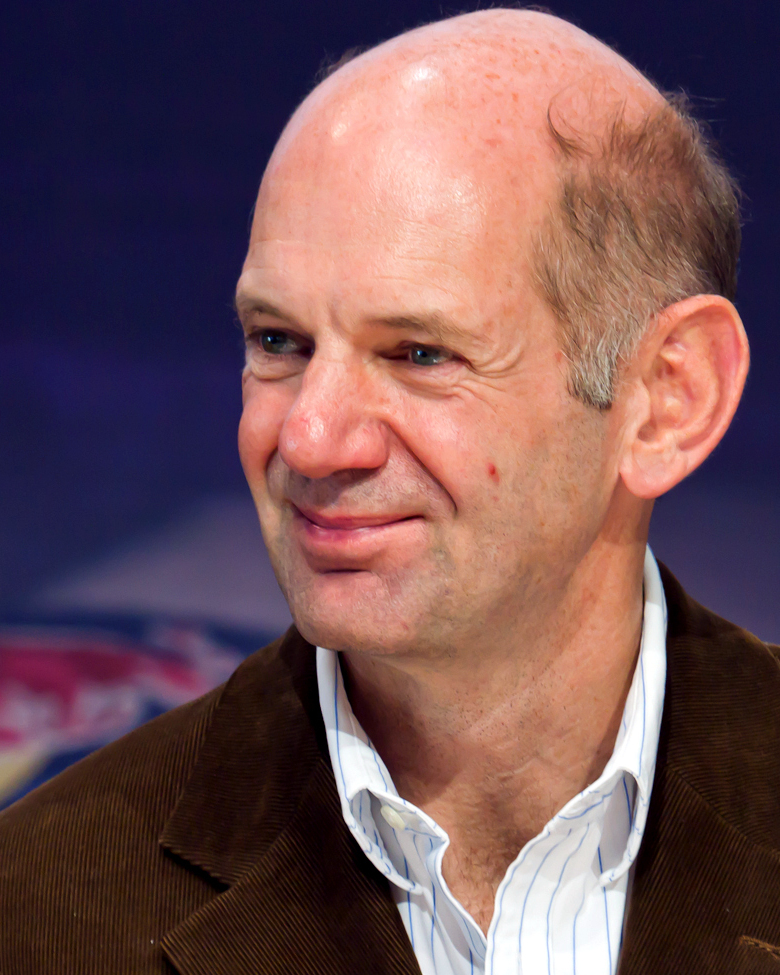
Adrian Newey, Formula One Engineer

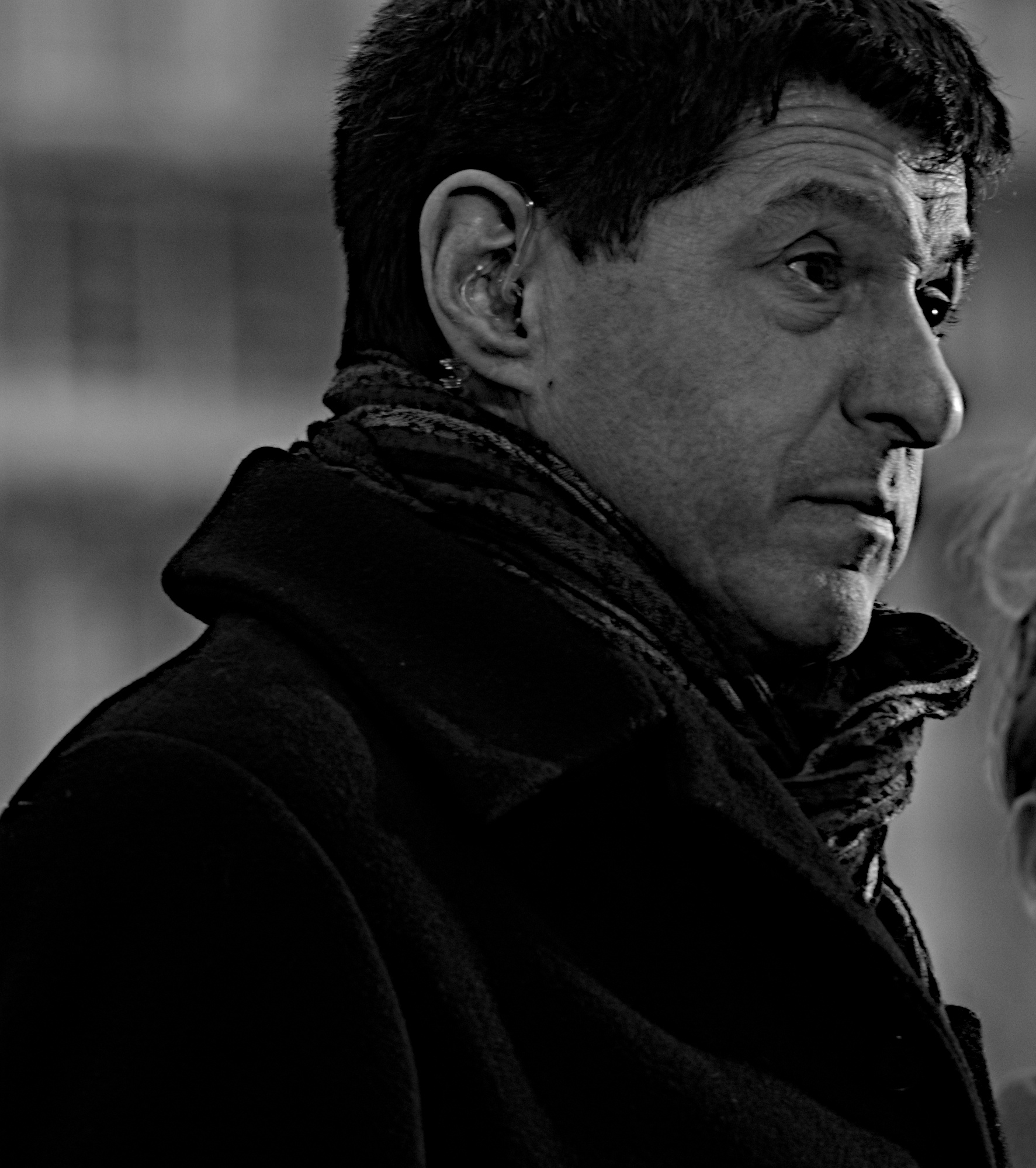
Jon Sopel, journalist

=== Academics ===
Academics working at the university include:

- Sir Tim Berners-Lee, inventor of the World Wide Web
- Wendy Hall, inventor of Microcosm, a predecessor of the World Wide Web, founding director of the Web Science Trust between the University of Southampton and MIT
- José Antonio Bowen, President of Goucher College and a Fellow of the Royal Society of Arts
- Erich Zepler, who made leading contributions to radio receiver development
- David Payne, inventor of EDFA for use in fibre optics cables
- Sir Barry Cunliffe, a pioneer of modern British archaeology
- Ray Monk, the biographer of Ludwig Wittgenstein
- Albie Sachs, former Judge of the Constitutional Court of South Africa
- Tim Holt, former President of the Royal Statistical Society and Office for National Statistics
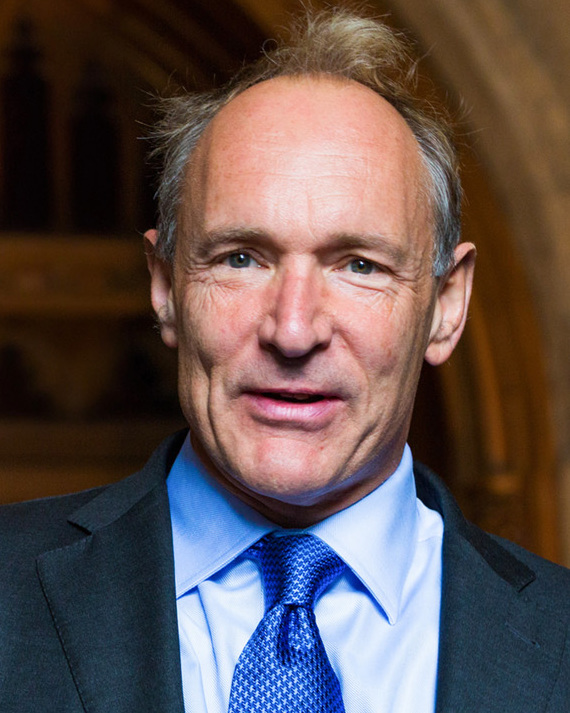
Sir Tim Berners-Lee, computer scientist

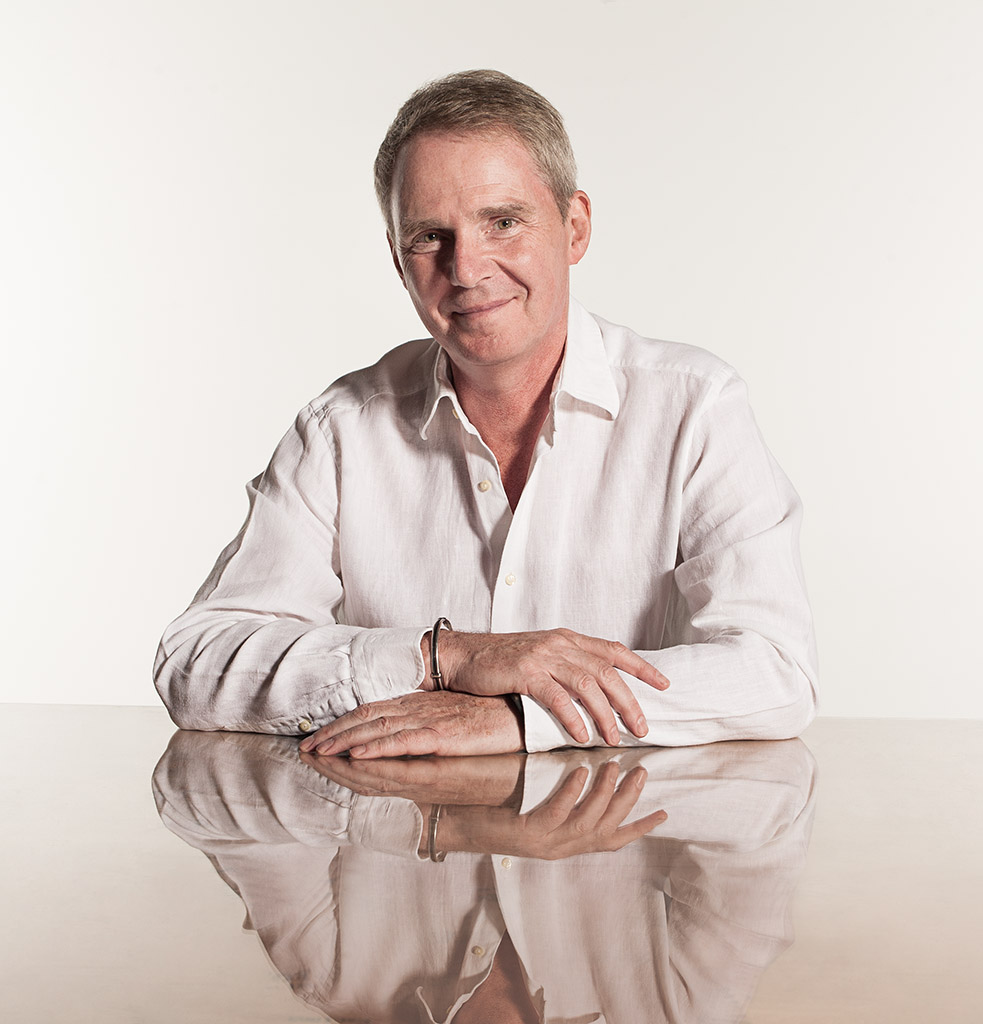
Sir Nigel Shadbolt, computer scientist

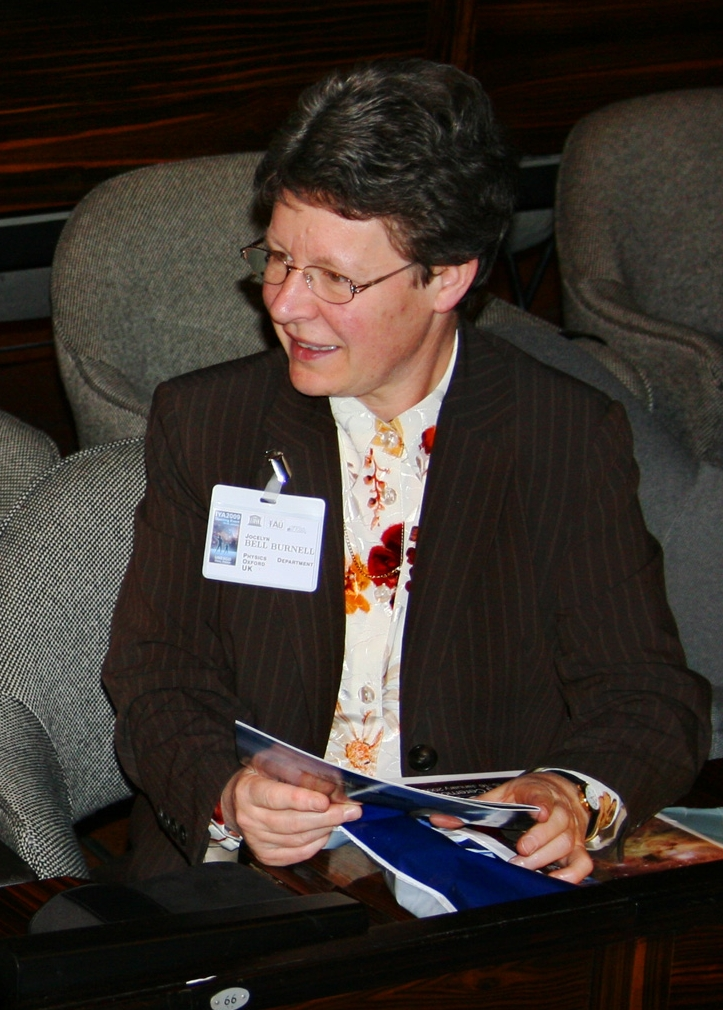
Dame Jocelyn Bell Burnell, astrophysicist

== See also ==
- Armorial of UK universities
- List of universities in the UK
