= Turton doubling =

Henry Turton (version)
Illustrated London News, 1856

Position: c8 black rook, h7 black pawn, b6 white pawn, b5 black pawn, c5 black pawn, c4 black pawn, c3 white bishop, g3 white queen, h3 white king, b2 black pawn, d2 white knight, a1 black king

Mate in three.

Turton doubling is a manoeuvre in chess in which a piece moves along a line (rank, file or diagonal), then a similarly-moving piece moves onto the same line in front of it, then this second piece moves again along this line, in the opposite direction to that of the first. Use of the term is effectively limited to the field of chess problems, although it happens in real games as well (especially when White moves the bishop on d3 back to let the queen in front to threaten Qh7#, and analogous for Black).

The idea can be understood in reference to the problem to the right, the first to demonstrate the manoeuvre, composed by its eponym, Henry Turton. A mate in three, the solution is 1.Bh8 (threatening 2.Qa3#) 1...b4 2.Qg7 Ra8 (defending against 3.Qa7#) 3.Qxb2#. The bishop moves along the diagonal a1-h8, then the queen moves onto that same diagonal, then the queen moves again in the opposite direction to the bishop.

Specific types of Turton doubling are the Loyd-Turton, in which the first piece moved is of greater value than the second; and the Brunner-Turton, in which the two pieces are of equal value. Cases such as Turton's original, in which the piece moved first is of lesser value than the second, have no special name.

Turton doubling can be contrasted with another form of doubling, Zepler doubling.
