= Hamburgischer Correspondent =

Former German newspaper

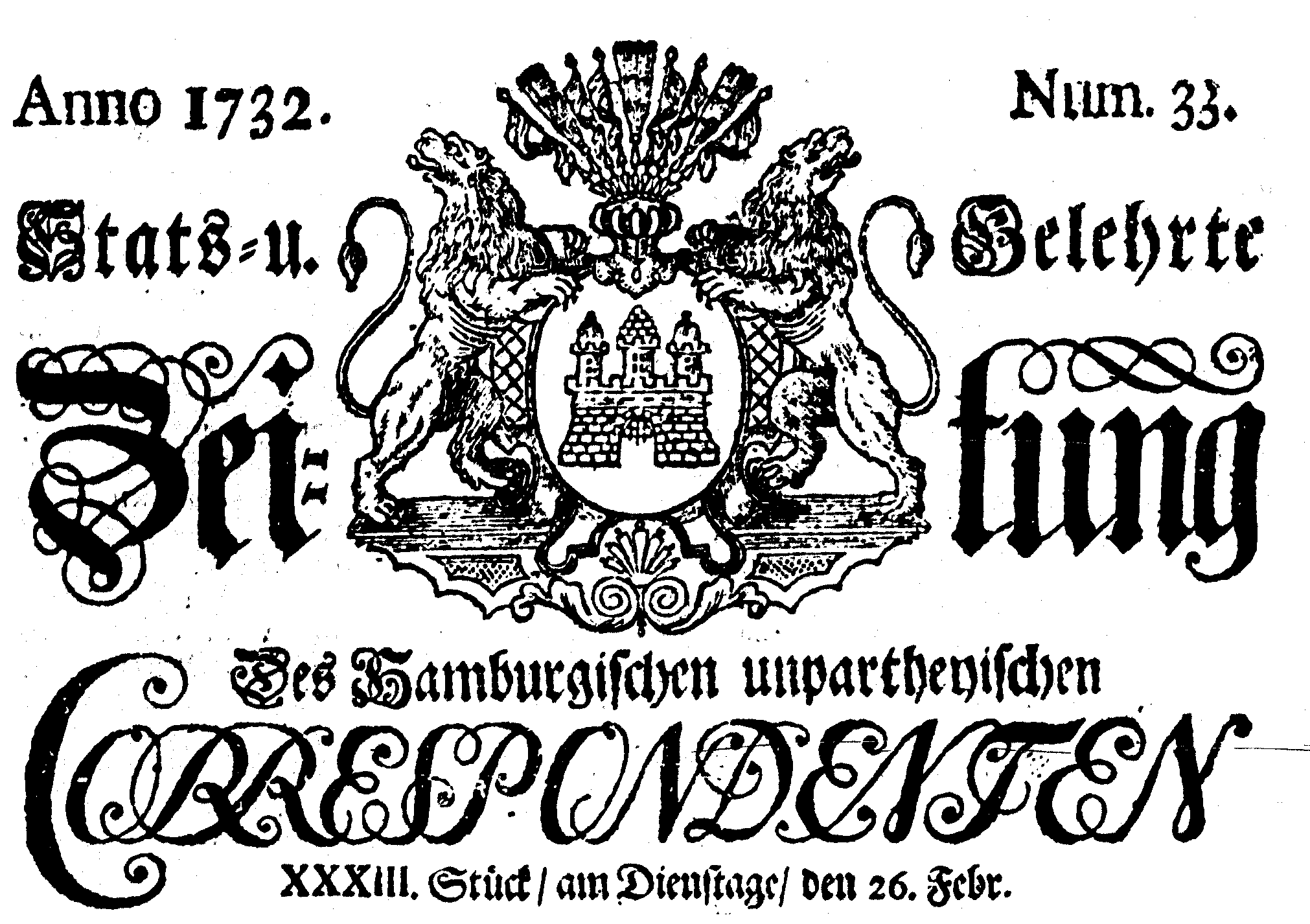
Head of the Hamburgischer Correspondent, 1732

Hamburgischer Correspondent was the oldest political newspaper in the city of Hamburg in Germany. It was highly respected and often cited in newspapers of neighboring countries. It was politically slanted towards the government, national-liberal, but most of the time independent of any political party. The newspaper was published for more than 200 years, but closed down during the Nazi years.

== History ==
Its history started in 1710 or 1711 when the book printer Holle in Schiffbeck near Hamburg published the Schiffbecker Posthorn twice weekly. Its name changed to Aviso and in 1721–1731 its title was Staats- und Gelehrte Zeitungen des holsteinischen unparteyischen Correspondenten. After it was acquired by another book printer Georg Christian Grund, and moved to Hamburg, its name changed to Staats- und gelehrte Zeitung des Hamburgischen unparteyischen Correspondenten (State and scholarly newspaper of Hamburg's nonpartisan correspondents). During French rule in Hamburg, it was published with French and German text under the title Journal du département des Bouches de l'Elbe.

Till the beginning of the French revolution, the Hamburger Correspondent was almost the only gazette in Germany which derived its information respecting foreign countries from original correspondence. The Neue Zeitung, in Hamburg, could not eventually sustain competition with it, and was discontinued. From these and similar sources, articles were copied into hundreds of provincial papers, and this was then called editing a gazette.

In the early 19th century it was the most widely distributed newspaper in the German language. It had a circulation of 30,000 copies (1806). In 1830 it became a daily newspaper and in the early 20th century it had 13 issues per week. Starting in 1852 it served as an official journal for the city of Hamburg. In 1862 it merged with the trade journal Hamburgische Börsenhalle (founded in 1805), which continued to appear twice weekly. The newspaper was incorporated as a shareholder company in 1869.

During the Weimar Republic (1920s) the newspaper was affiliated with the national-liberal German People's Party (Deutsche Volkspartei, DVP). It did not sell as well as it used to, and it got into financial problems. After the Nazi rise to power (Machtübernahme) and their suppression of the oppositional press, the termination of the financially troubled newspaper was accelerated. On 1 April 1934 it was acquired by the publisher Hermanns Erben and the newspaper merged with Hamburger Nachrichten. Thus, the Hamburgischer Correspondent became the first non-socialist newspaper in Hamburg to close down during Nazi rule.

Editors in chief were Julius von Eckardt (1870–74), in 1905 Hermann Diez and in 1924 Felix von Eckardt.
