= Highfield Campus =

Main campus of the University of Southampton

Coordinates: 50.9359°N 1.397°W

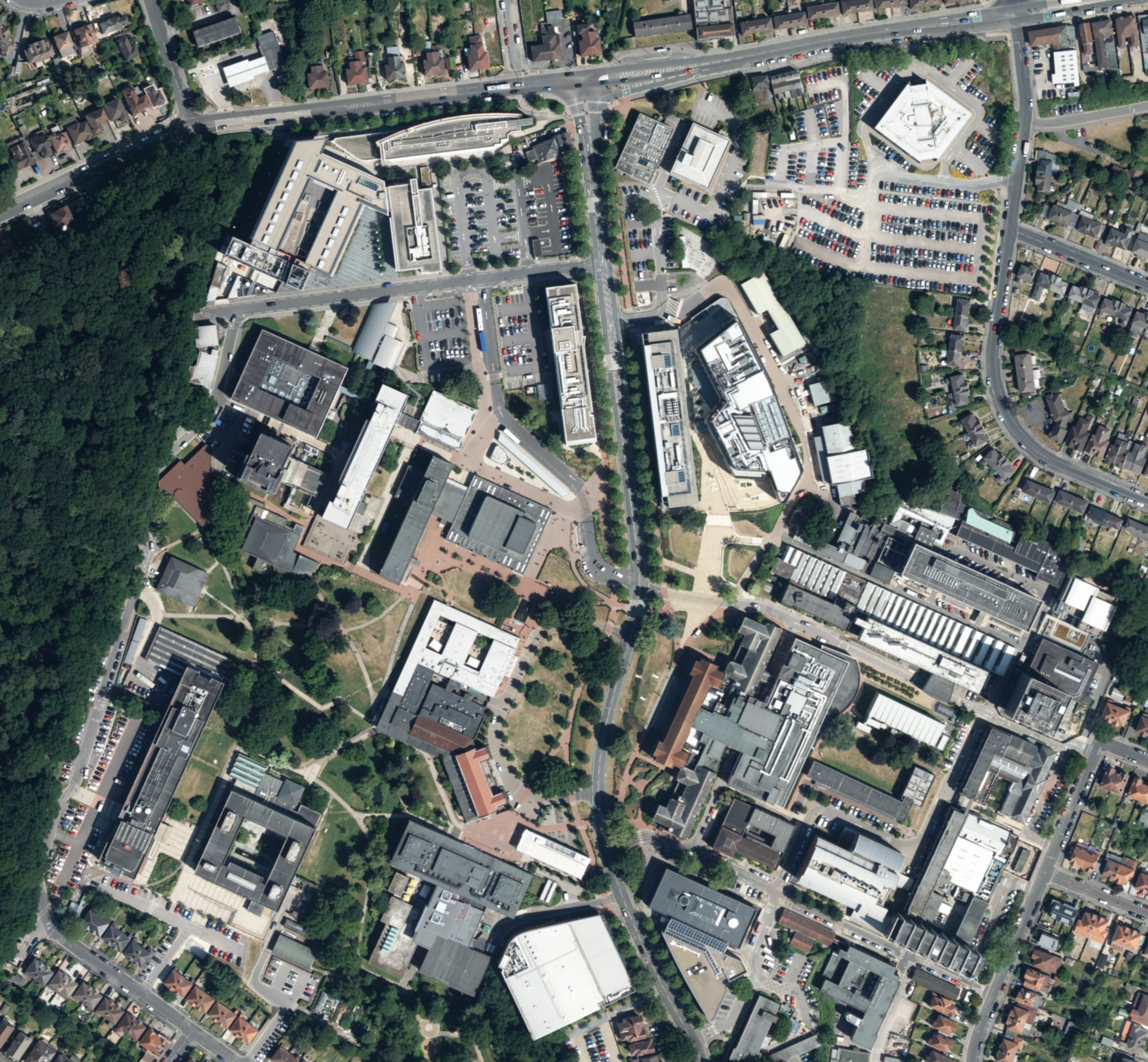
Aerial view of Highfield Campus

Highfield Campus is the main campus of the University of Southampton and is located in Southampton, southern England. It is the largest of the university's campuses with most of the students studying there. The campus is also the location of the main university library, the students' union as well as sports facilities.

== History ==
=== Early 20th century ===
The university's predecessor, the Hartley Institute, first bought the Highfield site in June 1909 at the cost of £5,000. Their old premises on the High Street no longer met the requirements of the Board of Education and the Treasury and so a new site was required for the college to expand.

The first campus buildings were opened on 20 June 1914 by the Lord Chancellor, Viscount Haldane. However soon after moving, the two buildings were handed over by the college authorities to the army for use throughout the First World War as a military hospital, with the college students and staff using the old High Street buildings until 1919. The campus was opened after the war in October 1919 with the college using two buildings (now forming part of the Hartley Library) which housed classes and laboratory facilities for the three hundred students. Due to difficulties in selling them on for a reasonable price, the High Street premises remained part of the college until the mid-1930s when they were sold for a combined total of £8,000.

=== Inter-war and 1940s ===
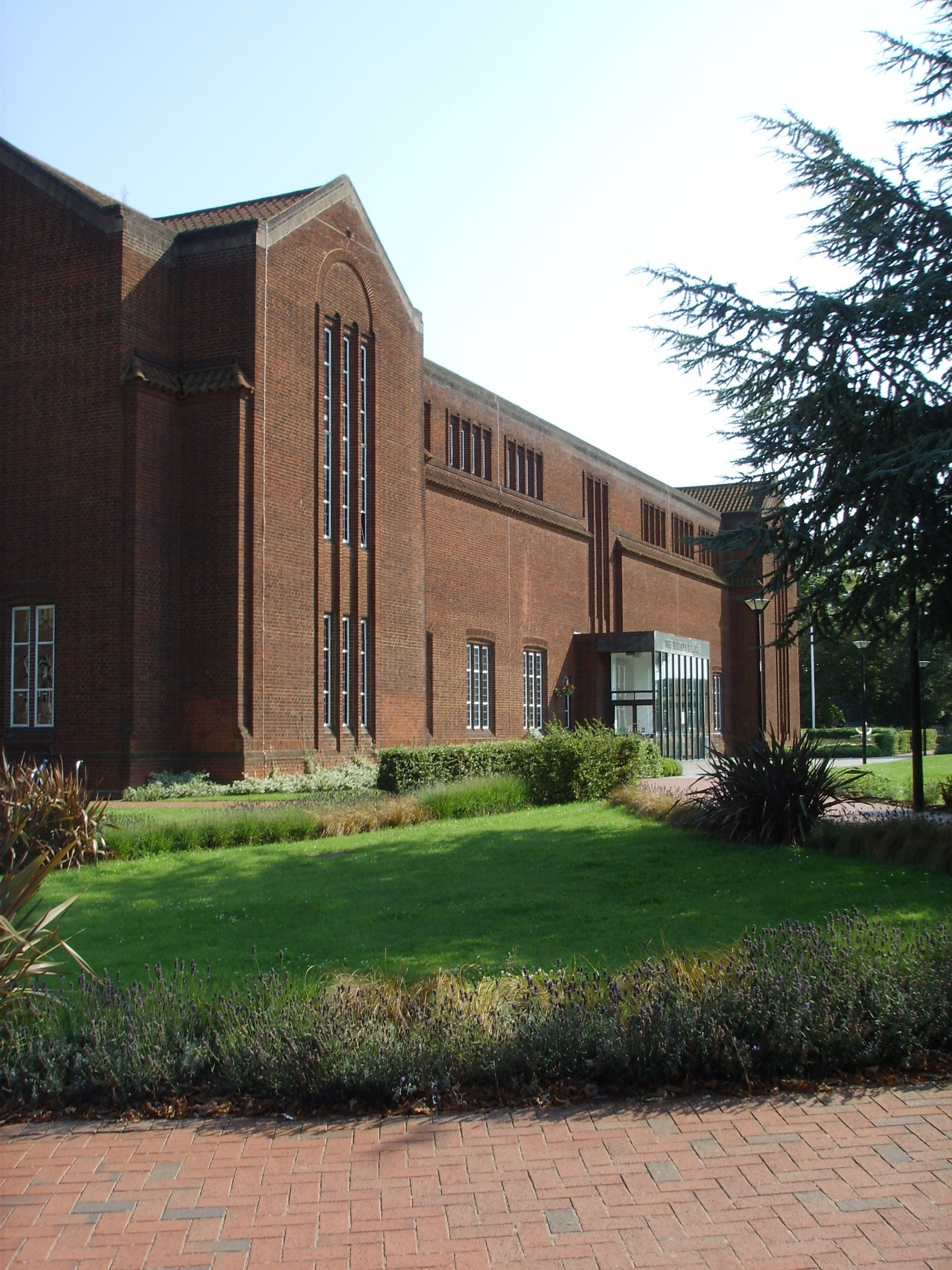
The Hartley Library

Valley Gardens, a biodiverse landscape planted in the 1960s

By the end of the 1930s the college had expanded to nearly 1,000 students, requiring further buildings to be constructed. Those that were constructed were designed by Colonel R. T, Gutteridge and his firm, made of brick. However, despite this the college still made use of wooden temporary buildings, constructed during the First World War, and which were used as laboratories, plant houses and teaching buildings for the Geology, Music and Arts department right up until the 1960s. Due to lacking finances, and the more pressing need for accommodation, any new buildings constructed during this period were the result of legacies: the George Moore Botanical Laboratories were constructed in 1927 (later housed the Careers Advice service and demolished in 2011) and the Zoology building in 1931 (Now the EScience building) was the result of an anonymous donation of £8,000. The social experience was also improved with the creation of an assembly hall in the 1920s large enough to house the student population.

During the late 1930s and 40s the university college again started to run out of room and so needed to improve their estate. New teaching buildings were constructed for Chemistry in 1937, Physics (Now occupied by the Estate department) in 1938 and Engineering in 1939. In addition, the Hartley library was built in 1935 following a donation of £24,250 (£1,460,500 in 2012) from the daughters of Edward Turner Sims. It was designed by Gutteridge and Gutteridge, with Sir Giles Gilbert Scott, and plugged the gap intentionally left between the original two buildings with library facilities, seminar rooms and a new reception for the university college.

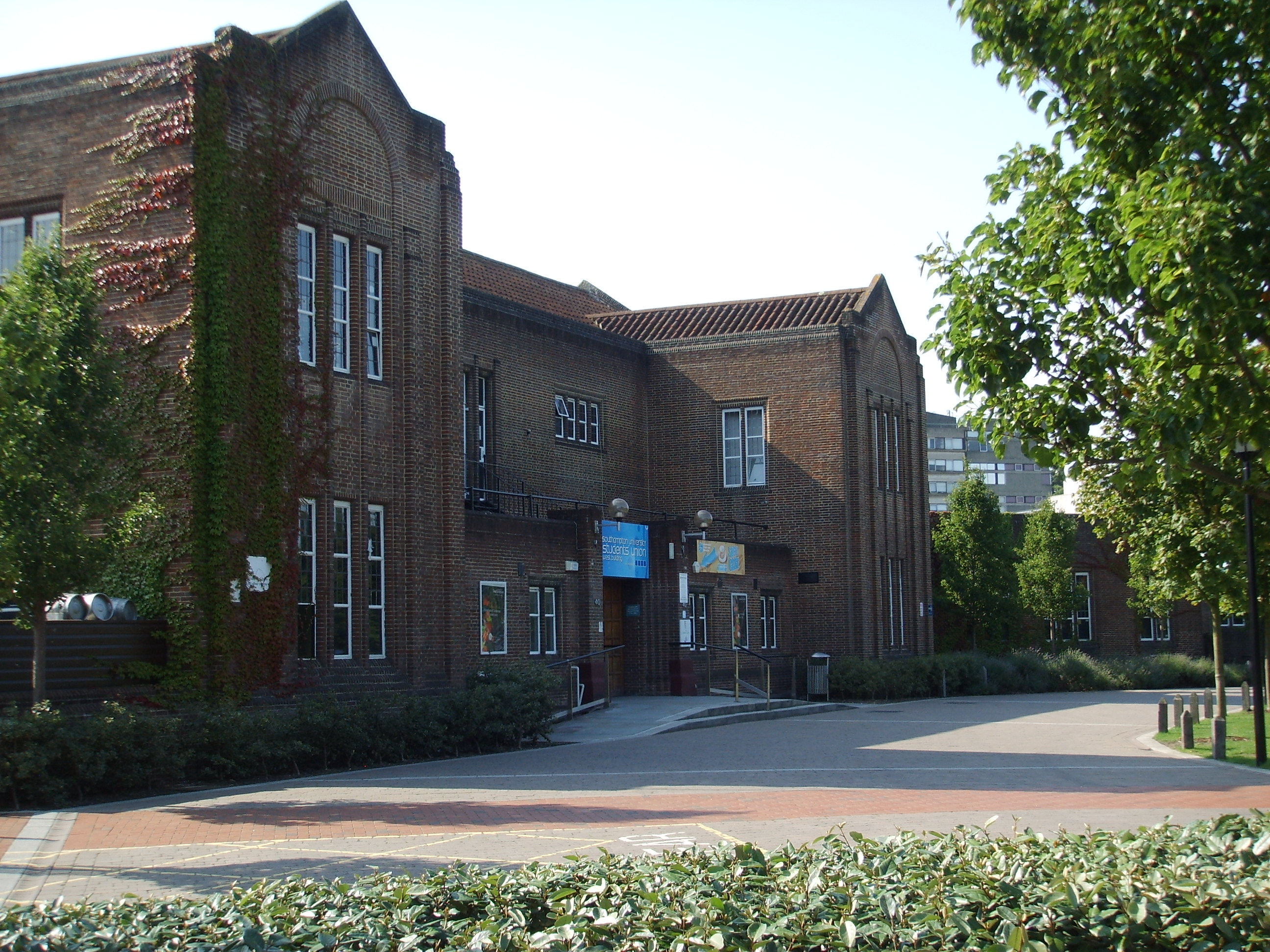
The West Building, built in 1939.

All of these buildings had been constructed on the eastern side of University Road but in 1939 the Western side of the campus was developed with the construction of the West Building in 1939/40. Built on the site of Sir Sidney Kimber's brickyard, the building housed the refectory, common rooms and the Students' Union and was further extended to include an assembly hall, suitable for performances and examinations, in 1948. Following the war, much of the university's capital budget went into purchasing new land, including the brickworks behind the West Building. At the same time the Institute of Education was given its own building in 1948, extensions were made to the Zoology building and the remainder of the Chemistry building completed.

=== 1950s and Basil Spence masterplan ===
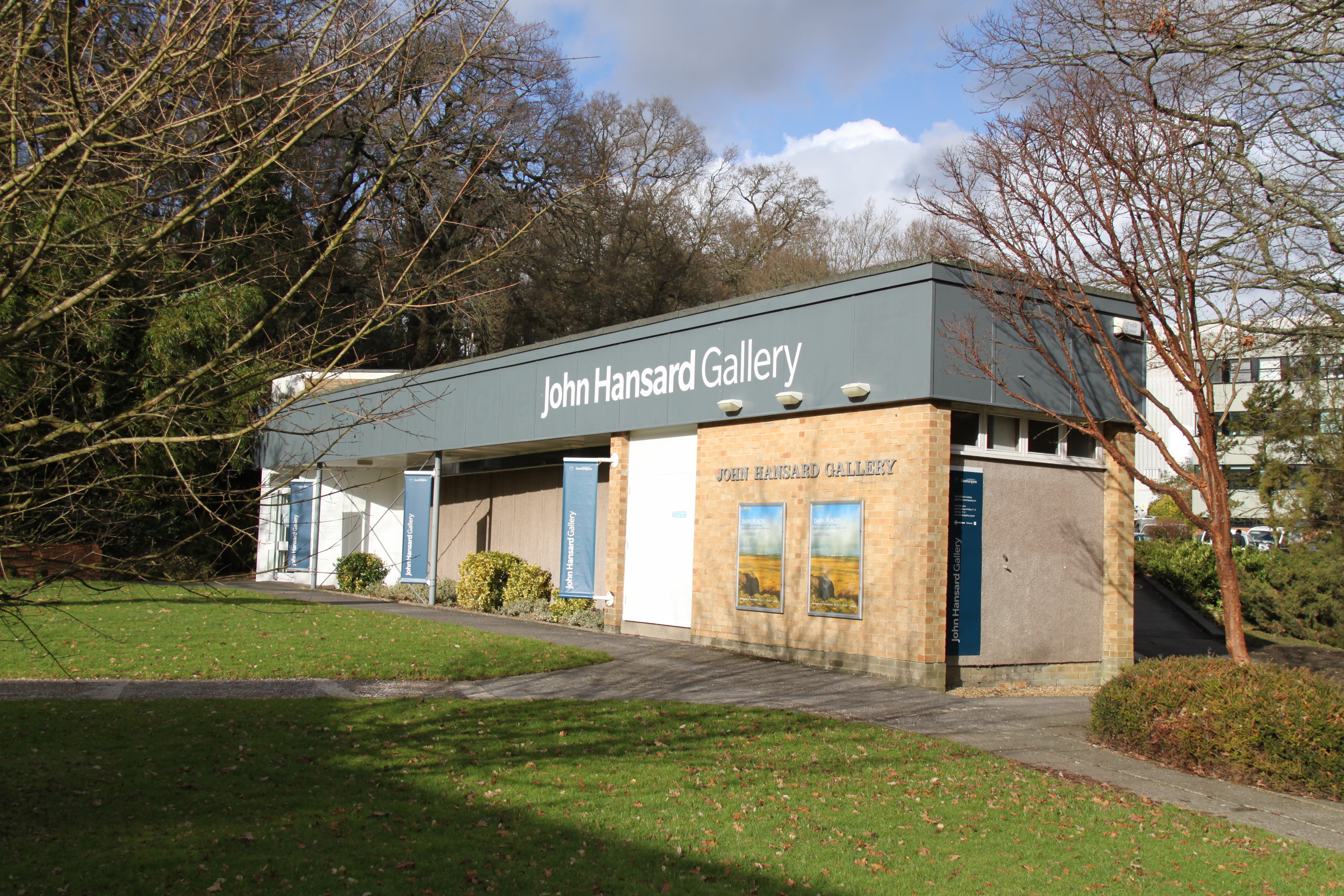
The John Hansard Gallery building, built in 1957 to house a tidal model of Southampton Water.

Following the creation of the university by royal charter in 1952, numbers at the university were set to increase again to around 2,500 by the mid-1960s. As a result, the university estate needed to expand and the inadequate facilities needed to be replaced. The end of the 1950s saw an explosion of building work in a whole variety of styles. On the West site, a new computer building was built in 1958 and a Tidal model of Southampton Water constructed in 1957 (now the John Hansard Gallery), both designed by Ronald H Sims. In addition, Gutteridge and Gutteridge were undertaking several extensions to pre-existing buildings: the Physics building in 1960, the Education building in 1961 and the Library in 1959. Whereas the first two extensions were in the same style as the earlier building, the new Gurney-Dixon library extension was built in a modernist style, linking the three main buildings together and providing space for 150,000 books and 400 readers.

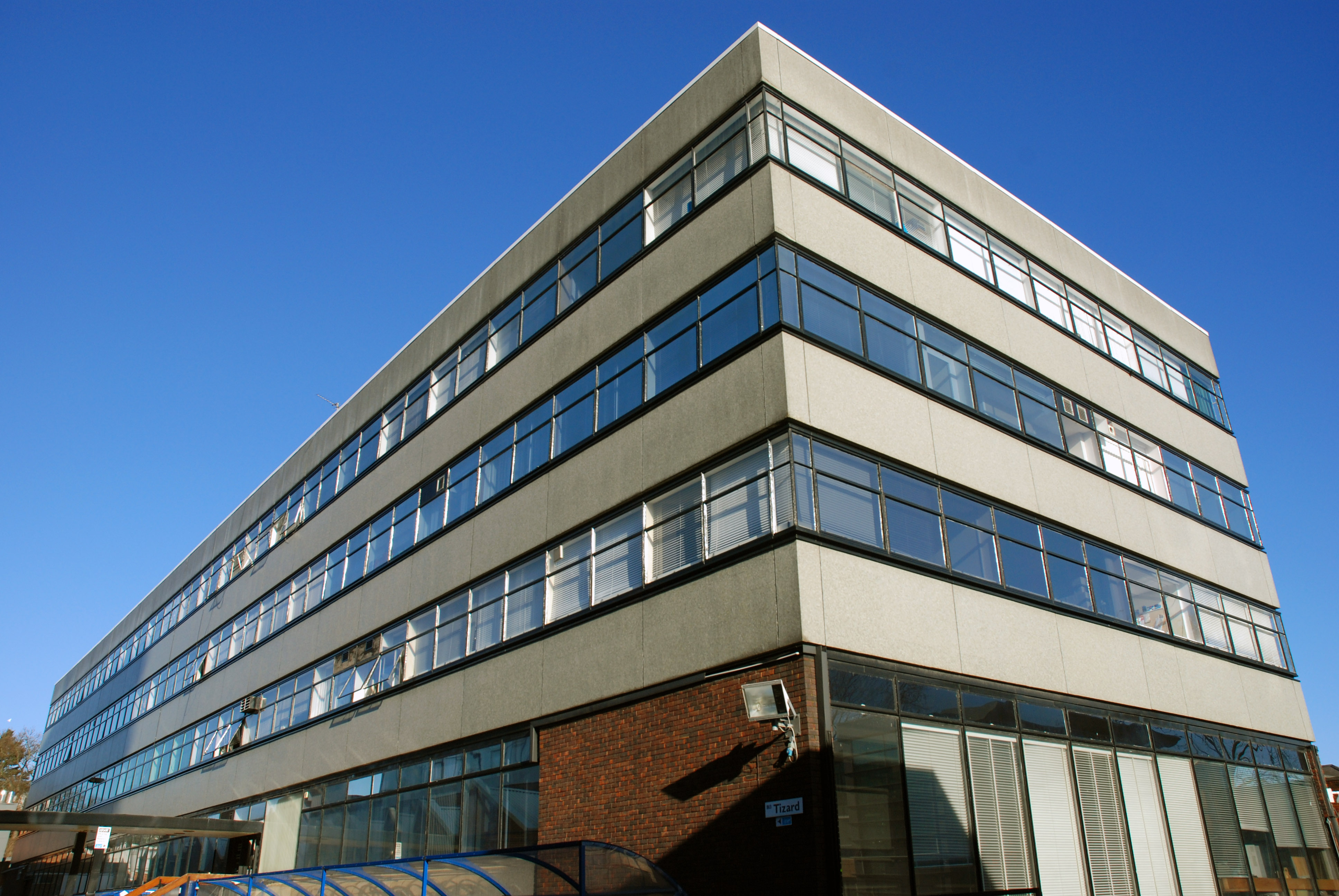
The Tizard building, built in 1959, is typical of the Spence-designed buildings.

The remaining buildings were built under the direction of Sir Basil Spence, who was appointed as Consultant Architect in 1956. All of the buildings designed by him used mainly concrete and glass wrapped in mosaic and were each centred around a focal area either to the east or west of University Road, ignoring the road in doing so. The first buildings were completed in 1959 and included the Froude building, built for Social Sciences and located in the centre of Engineering Square, and the Lanchester and Tizard buildings for the Engineering, Electronics and Aerospace studies, located on the north of the square and connected to the pre-existing engineering facilities. The following year the extension of the west building was completed and linked in with a new Senior Common Room (now known as the Staff Social Centre).

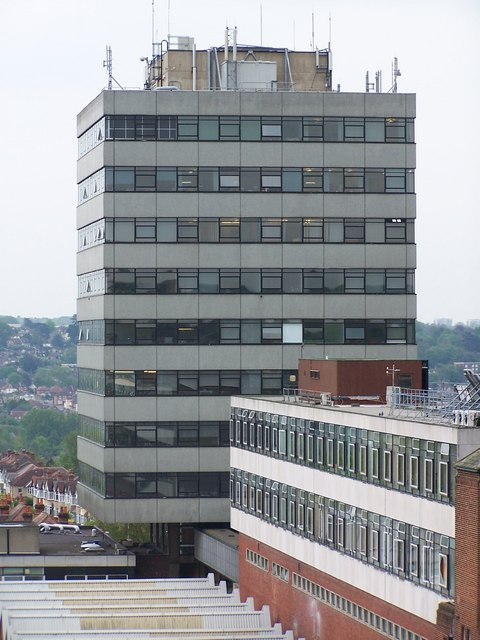
The Faraday Tower, completed in 1963.

As a new decade dawned construction work started to become dominated by two large tower structures: the Graham Hills tower, built over 1960 and 1961, providing accommodation for Chemistry in the south east corner of Engineering Square and the Faraday tower, built between 1960 and 1963, for Engineering in the north east corner of Engineering Square.

The next building to be completed was the Arts building (now the Law school) and adjoining Nuffield Theatre. Built between 1961 and 1963, the building allowed the Arts faculty to leave the central building for the first time and expand. Adjacent to Arts 1 is the Mathematics tower, built between 1963 and 1965 by Ronald H Sims in the brutalist style and thus is notably different from the buildings around it with exposed concrete. Also around the same time, Oceanography received a new building north of the campus on Burgess Road (now housing part of Electronics and Computer Science since 1996), which was completed in 1965 and designed in brick by the Sheppard Robson Partnership.

The pace continued with three buildings completed in close proximity in 1966 along the southern edge of the west side of the campus. These buildings were notable in that their layout differed from the plans laid out by Basil Spence a decade earlier, although the styling remained the same. These are the Physics building, complete with observatory, the Geology building (now renamed the Shackleton building and housing Geography and Psychology since 1996) and the Students' Union building.

The final buildings matching the style of the Basil Spence Masterplan were the Arts II building (now Management and Music since 1996), built in 1968, a further extension to the Engineering accommodation in the form of the Wolfson and Raleigh buildings that same year and the Murray building, housing the Social Sciences departments, in 1975.

=== 1970s and 1980s ===
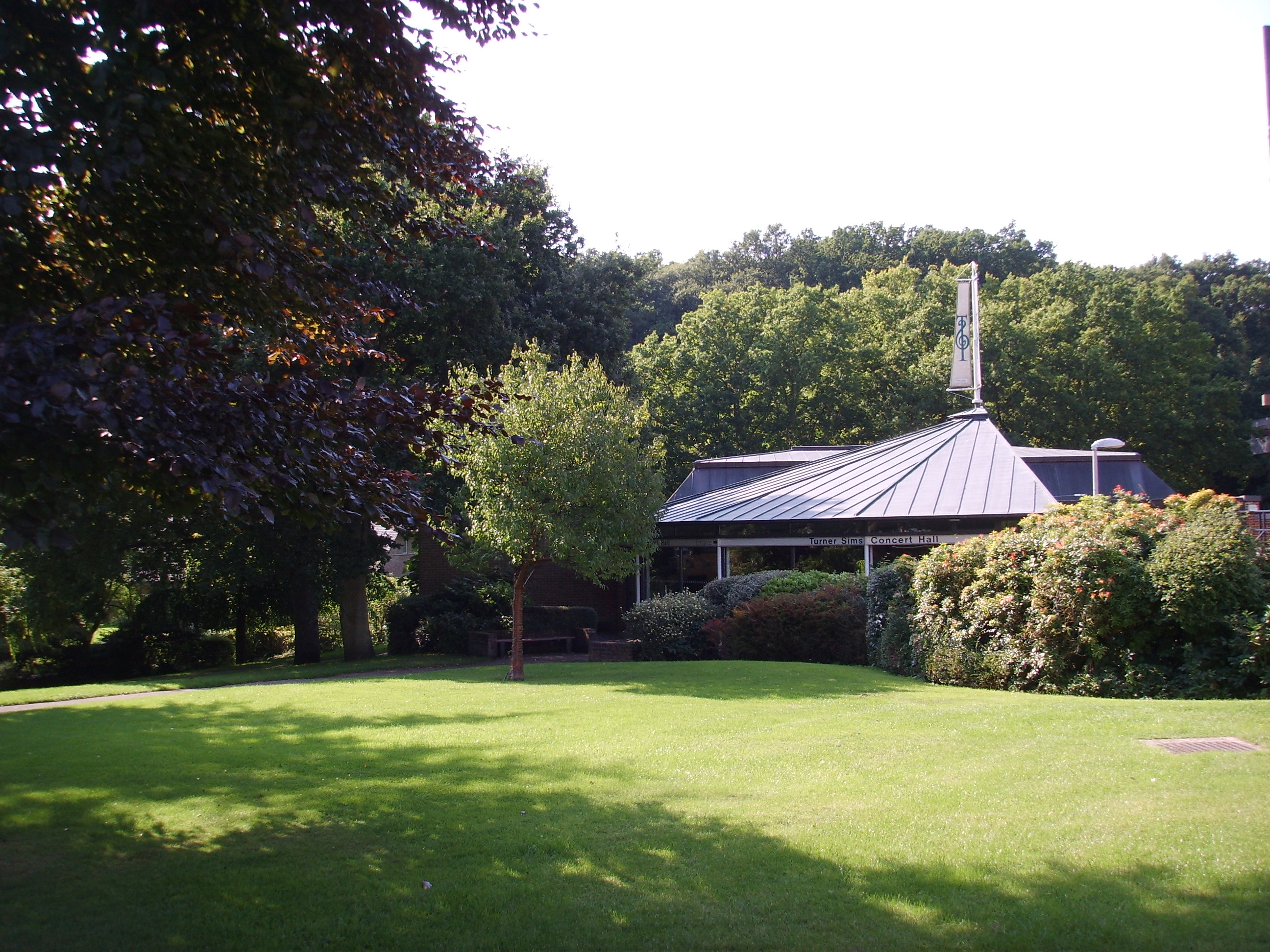
The Turner Sims Concert Hall was purpose built in 1974.

Development slowed during the 1970s and 1980s as economic problems started to bite and it was during this period that the design concepts of the Basil Spence plan started to be dropped in favour of more conventional styles such as brick. The long-awaited Administration building, designed again by the Sheppard Robson Partnership, was constructed south of the library in 1970 and allowed these departments to move out of the main library building for the first time. This was followed in 1974 with the long-awaited opening of the Turner Sims Concert Hall. Resulting from a £30,000 bequest from Margaret Grassam Sims for this purpose, the new concert hall would allow music performances to move out of the increasingly busy Nuffield Theatre and into an environment specifically designed for music. The design of the hall itself was by staff from the university's Institute of Sound and Vibration Research ensuring the hall's good acoustics.

Following on from these high impact developments, the campus saw several smaller developments: Clarkson House, a small halls of residence suitable for disabled students and now the Early Years Centre, opened in 1978 just south of the Administration building and partly funded by the British Council for the Disabled, the Clarkson Foundation and the Department of Health and Social Security. New facilities for Engineering were being constructed behind housing (now demolished) in University Crescent and were all of the industrial nature: the R J Mitchell Wind Tunnel was relocated from Farnborough and reconstructed in 1981, the A B Woods underwater laboratory in 1989 and the Tony Davies High Voltage Laboratory in 1991. The final building from this period was a small addition located on Burgess Road next to the Oceanography building. Now housing some of ECS, it opened in 1989 and was designed by Sheppard Robson.

=== 1990–1998 ===
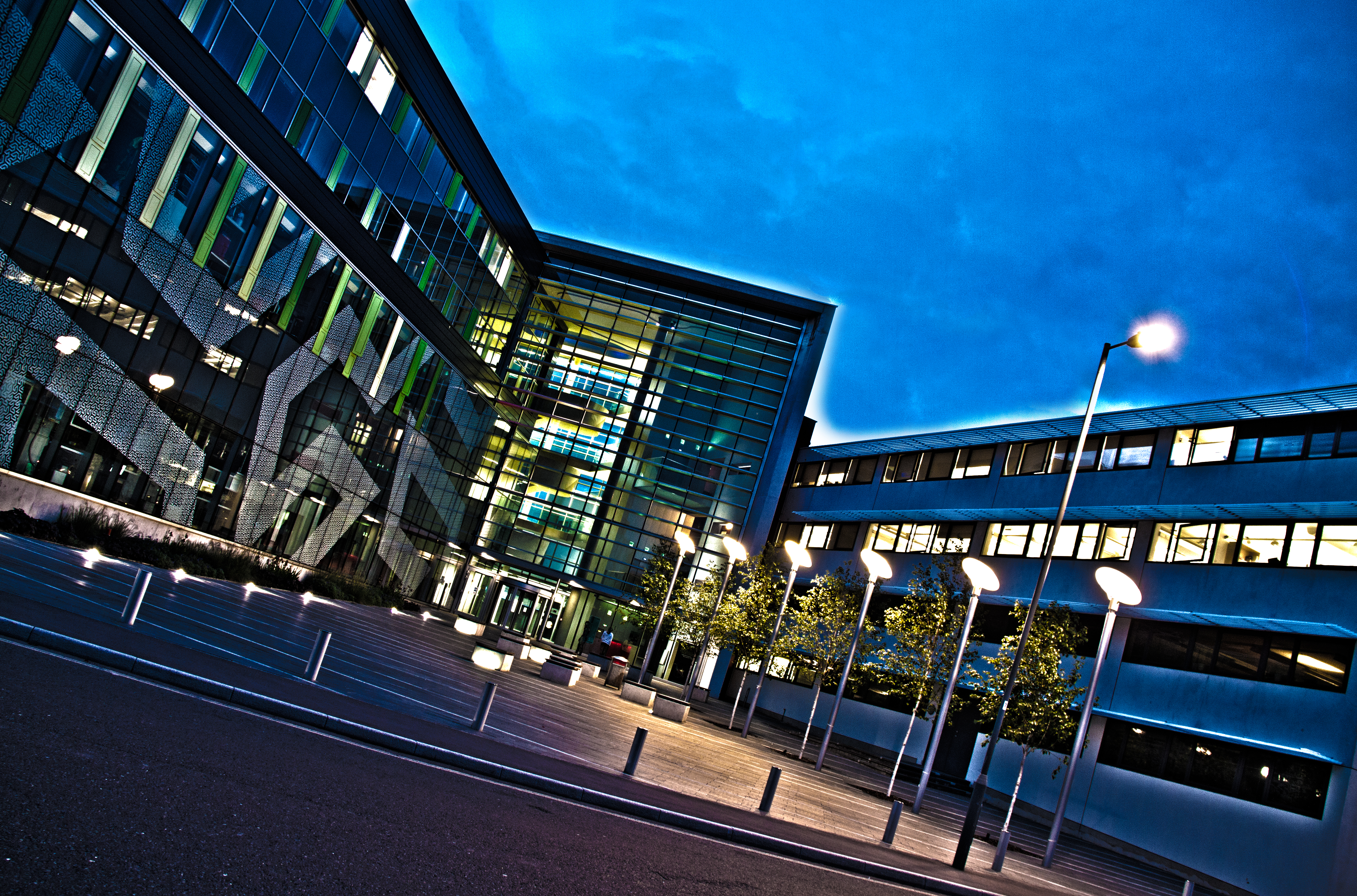
The 1998 built Zepler building on the right and the 2008 built Mountbatten building on the left.

Following the slow pace of capital development projects during the previous decade, projects started again at the end of the 1980s. The first building of the new decade to be completed was the new Mountbatten building, allowing the Electronics and Computer Science department to move out of the Engineering accommodation. Completed in 1991 it was designed by the John S Bonnington Partnership, Basil Spence's former practice and who had worked on the campus buildings since the 1960s, and featured a design of aluminium cladding for the building that proved controversial.

That same year a Highfield Planning Group was formed under the direction of Professor Tim Holt to oversee how the university and the campus could develop further, given that the new Mountbatten building had used the last of the university's building plots. As the university had now exceeded the Master Plan set out by Sir Basil Spence set out in the late 1950s, a new one had to be developed, so the university approached Chesterton Consulting to devise a new one. These new plans had to satisfy the planning laws on parking that required a certain number of new spaces for every development, requiring the plan to include three multi-storey car parks and a reconfiguration of University Road. None of these eventually occurred as the university and the Consultancy lobbied the council and were able to change the guidance to allow further development to be easier.

To cement the end of Spence's master plan the next new building to be constructed on campus, the University Health Service in 1992, breached one of Spence's fundamental principles by blocking the flow of vegetation linking the western gardens with the common. The new master plan also saw the expansion of the university onto the new Avenue Campus, resulting in the Arts subjects to move to that new campus. As a result, the Arts buildings were vacated and it led to several departments changing buildings around 1995 and allowing the refurbishment of several of the 1960s building stock. In addition, a programme of new building works commenced: the Health Professional and Rehabilitation Sciences building was built in the North East corner of the campus in 1994 and featured a modern design by Sir Norman Foster; the Students' Union Retail Centre was added in 1995/6 and completed the side of a new social square outside the Union, all constructed and landscaped by London practice Allies and Morrison; the Social Sciences Graduate Centre in 1997 (accompanying the Murray building) and the long-awaited Synthetic Chemistry building which was located adjacent to the existing chemistry buildings, replacing some older and smaller buildings on the site and thereby closing off Engineering Square, and was built between 1996 and 1998 according to the design of London architects the Wilson Mason Partnership.

=== 1998-present ===
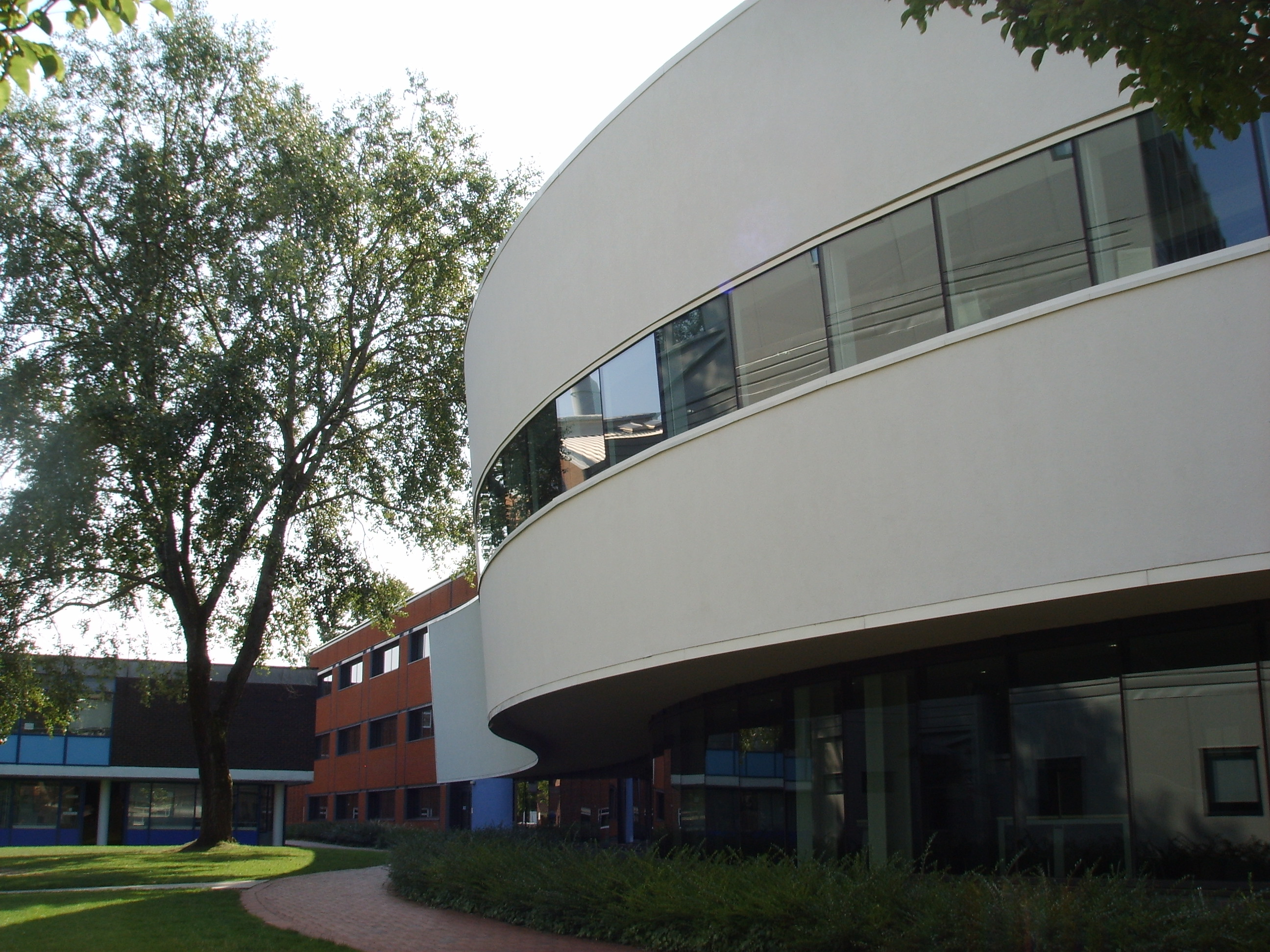
The extension to the Hartley Library, completed in 2004.

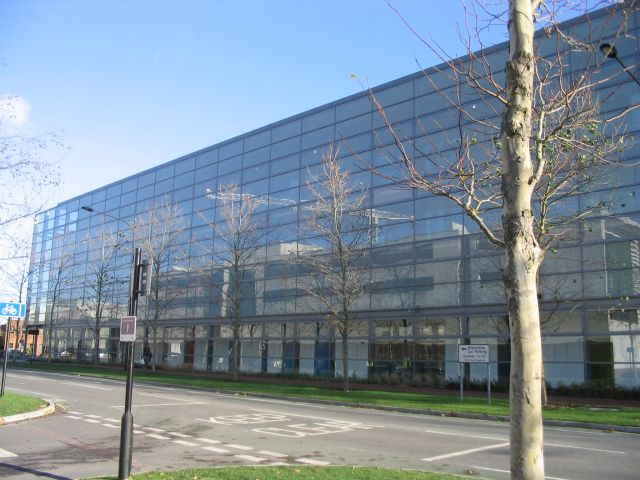
The EEE building, completed in 2007.

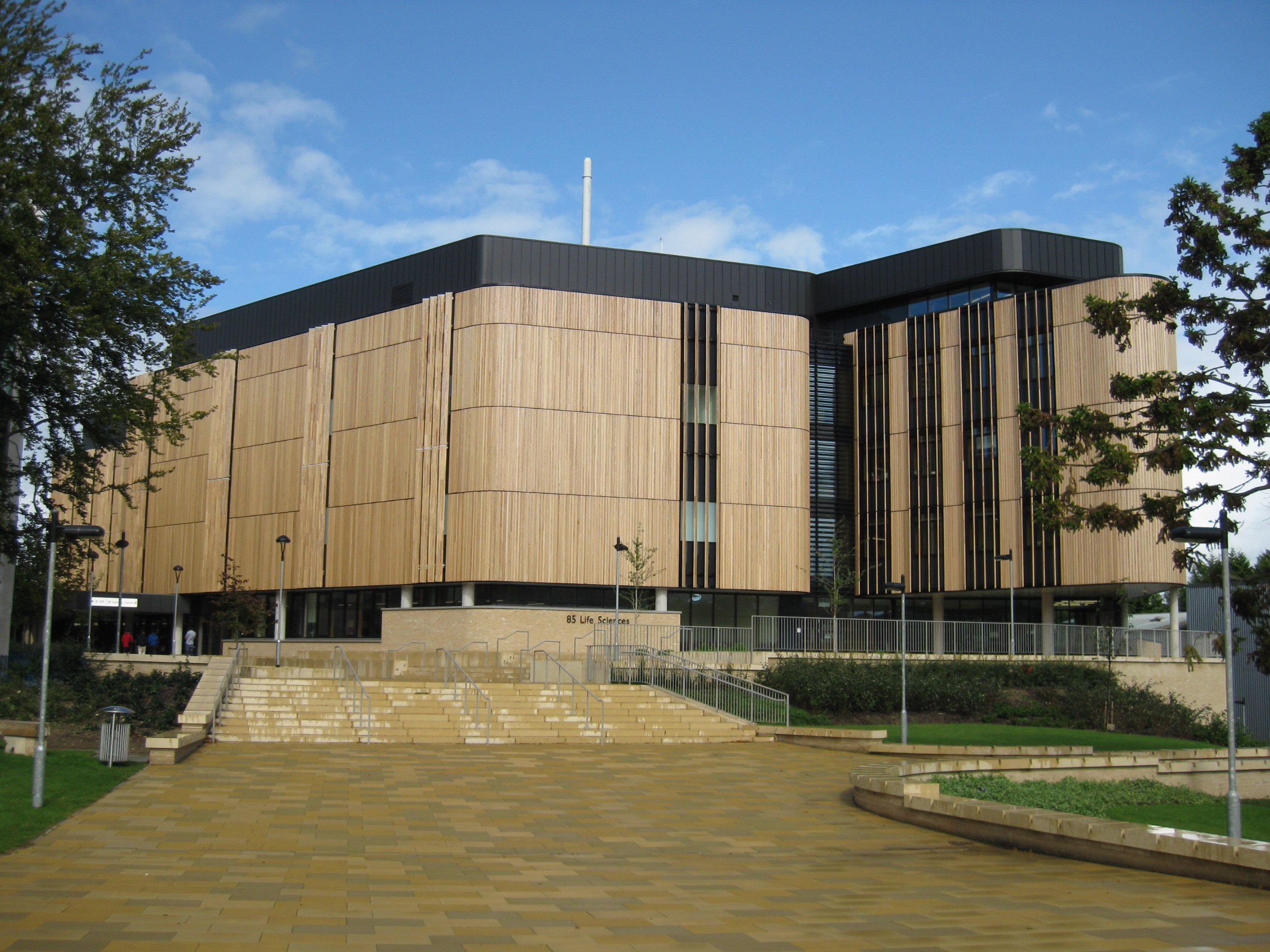
The Life Sciences building, completed in 2010.

Following the lobbying of the council from the university and Chesterton Consulting, local planning laws were altered, removing the need for additional parking spaces on campus. This change led to the introduction of the Unilink bus service, and also made the Chesterton master plan completely obsolete. As a result, Rick Mather Architects were hired to draw up a new masterplan for Highfield which was completed by 1998. It proposed that University Road, instead of dividing the campus, become a tree lined boulevard, with paths set back from the road and lined by simple white rendered buildings along the northern part of the campus. At this point in time, much of this northern part of the campus still contained residential buildings housing commercial services, such as banks, and the new master plan proposed demolishing these, rehousing the services into new buildings and using the space to significantly improve the landscape.

The first of these new master plan buildings was the Zepler building in 1998, housing an extension to Electronics and Computer Sciences, and the Gower building in 1999 which housed both student accommodation on the upper floors and commercial units on the ground floor and currently houses all the banks on campus and the bookshop. These two were designed by Rick Mather and Wilson Mason and used the white rendered style that Mather felt complemented both the brick buildings of the Gutteridge designs and the concrete designs of Basil Spence. It also created a new 'gateway' for the university along Burgess Road.

Following these two buildings, several more buildings of the same design were erected across the campus: the Nightingale building was built along University Road in 2000 to house the School of Midwifery (and now the Faculty of Health Sciences as a whole), the Southampton Statistical Sciences Research Institute building in 2003 next to the Murray building and an extension of the Hartley Library into Engineering Square, completed in 2004. Necessitating the demolition of some minor buildings in the square, the Library extension housed new facilities for Archives and Special collections, additional shelf and reader space.

In addition to these, the building boom continued with several other buildings in their own style. The Students' Union building was extended in 2001 to include a new nightclub and cinema facility; the Jubilee Sports Centre was completed in 2004 housing a swimming pool, large sports hall and gym located on University Road next to the Students' Union; an extension to the south of the administration building was opened in 2005 to house a new Student Services Centre and a new building for the Institute for Sound and Vibration Research was constructed in 2006 among the Engineering buildings. The Jubilee Sports Centre and the Student Services Centre were both designed in brick to blend in with the nearby residential and Gutteridge designed buildings.

In 2005 a fire broke out in the Mountbatten building, causing the ECS department to be crippled until replacement facilities could be found. As a result, the university needed to replace the building as soon as possible and took the opportunity to create a new campus masterplan, set to last until 2021. The new and replacement Mountbatten building was opened in 2008 and included new and updated clean rooms while still being an environmentally friendly design. The master plan also included the new EEE building, which was opened in 2007 as a space for ECS, the School of Education and as an Entrance building for the campus and features a glass wall showcasing an 'internal street'.

The latest building to be added to the campus is the Life Sciences building, housing facilities for the Faculty of Natural and Environmental Sciences and the Faculty of Medicine. Designed by global architecture firm NBBJ, the wood-clad building was created as a direct result of the Boldrewood Campus redevelopment and the need to rehouse the faculties based on that campus. Completed in 2010, it has been recognised by the Royal Institute of British Architects.

== Location ==
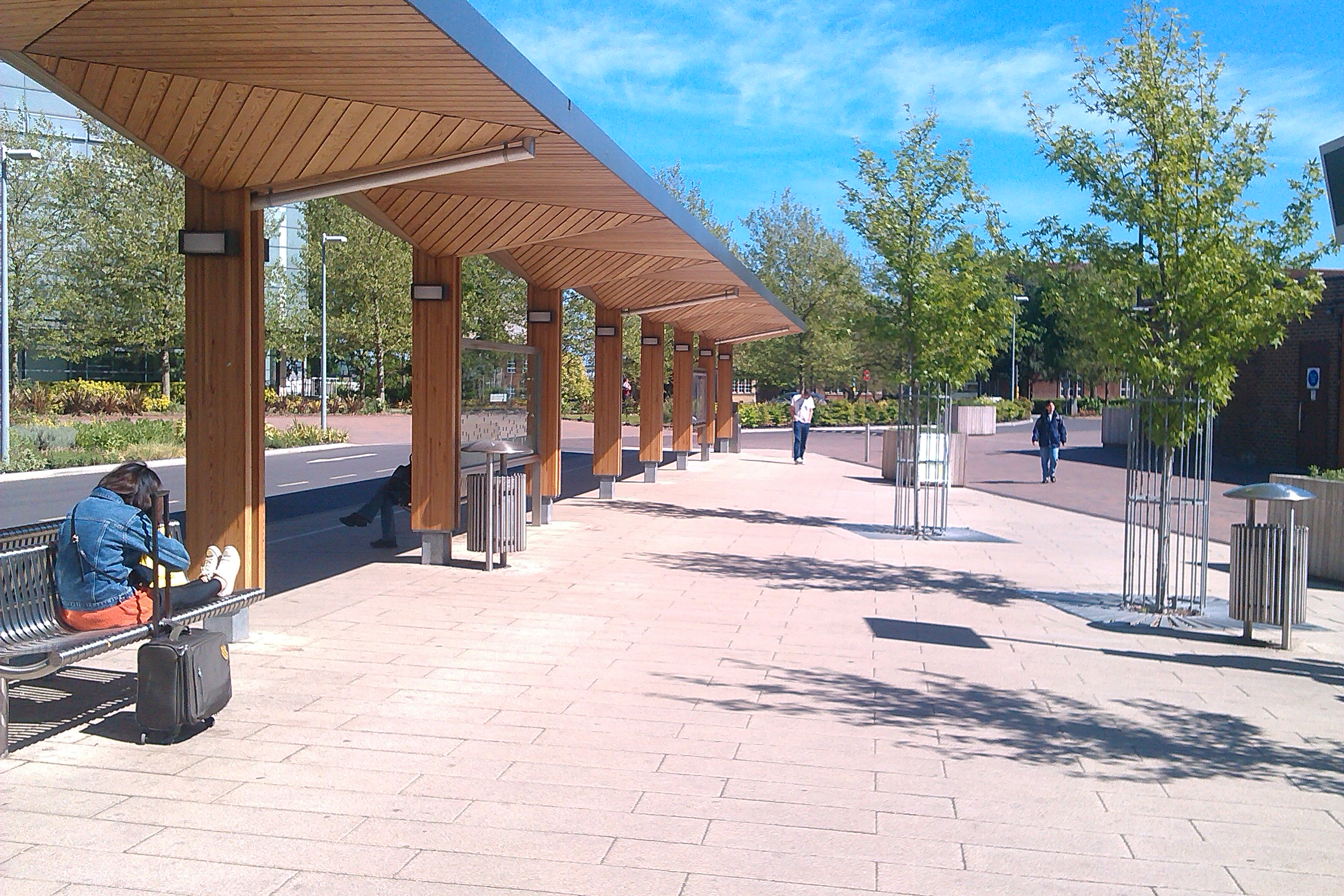
The Unilink Interchange located in the centre of campus.

The campus is located in the Highfield area of Southampton and is bordered by Southampton Common along its western edge and Burgess Road on its northern edge. It is dissected by the north/south University Road, splitting the campus into East and West sections. The area surrounding the campus is mainly residential in nature.

The campus is served by the Unilink U1, U2, U6, U7, U8 and U9 routes that connect the campus to the Airport, Wessex Lane, Glen Eyre and other halls of residence, the City Centre and the university's satellite campuses at Southampton General Hospital and the National Oceanography Centre. All routes stop at the Unilink interchange in the centre of campus. In addition to the Unilink services, the interchange is also served by National Express Coaches 032 and 203 to London and Portsmouth.

== See also ==
- University of Southampton
- Avenue Campus
- National Oceanography Centre, Southampton
- Southampton General Hospital
- Winchester School of Art
- Boldrewood Campus
- Highfield, Southampton
