= Florence Miller =

Florence Miller may refer to:

- Florence Miller (cricketer) (born 2004), English cricketer
- Florence Miller (writer) (1854–1935), English journalist, author and social reformer
- Florence Clark Miller (1889–1967), British geographer
- Florence Miller Pierce (1918–2007), American artist
- Phebe Florence Miller (1889-1979), Canadian writer

== See also ==
- Florene Miller Watson (1920–2014), American aviator and educator
