= Wessex Lane Halls =

Halls of residence of the University of Southampton

Coordinates: 50.93668°N 1.37651°W

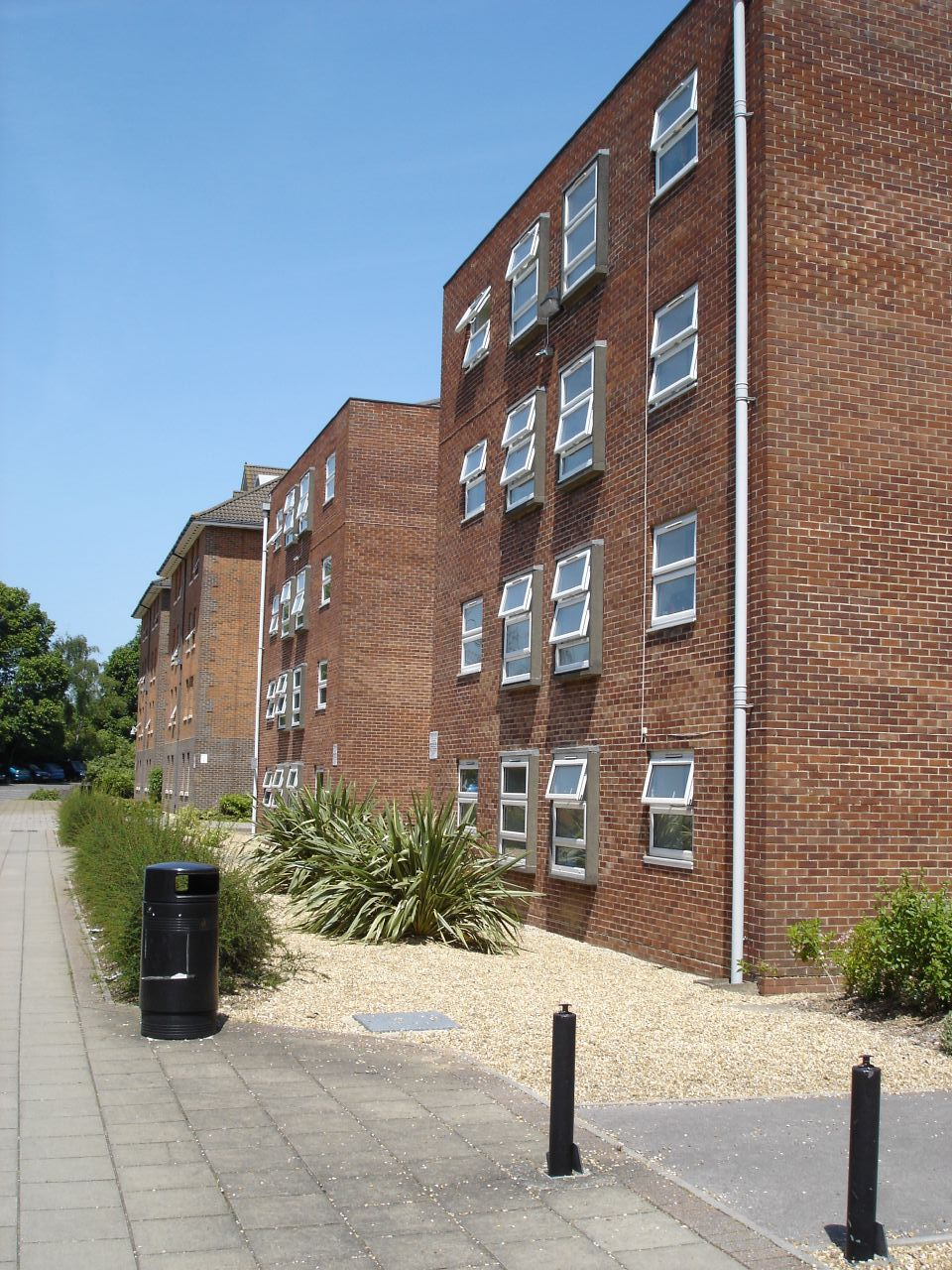
Montefiore House 2 (Block F), as seen from the complex entrance, with Block J of Montefiore 3 behind.

Wessex Lane Halls is a halls of residence complex owned by the University of Southampton. It is situated in the Swaythling district of Southampton, approximately one mile north-east of the university campus in Highfield.

The complex is formed of South Stoneham House, Connaught Hall and Montefiore House. There are over 1800 undergraduate and postgraduate students living in Wessex Lane Halls.

University of Southampton students living in Halls are supported by the Residences Support Service, who are available throughout the night. The students organise their own social events, sports teams and deal with welfare issues through the JCR (Junior Common Room) committee which is elected each year. The bars are run by the students union.

The complex is served by excellent transport links, with regular Unilink buses heading north to Southampton Airport (and Eastleigh at peak times) and south to Southampton City Centre and hourly trains from nearby Swaythling railway station.

== South Stoneham House ==
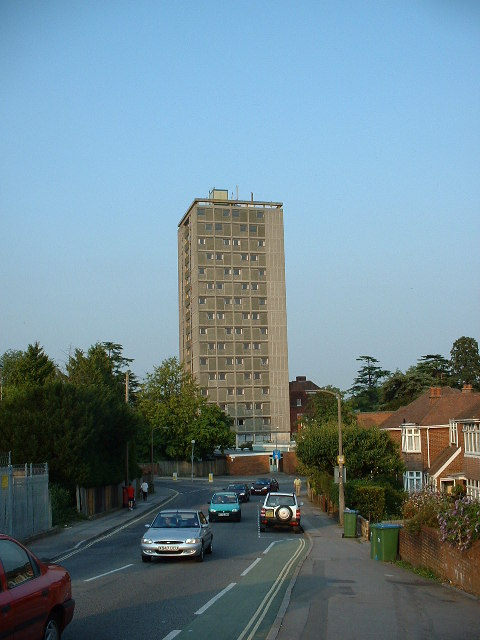
The 17 storey extension to South Stoneham House.

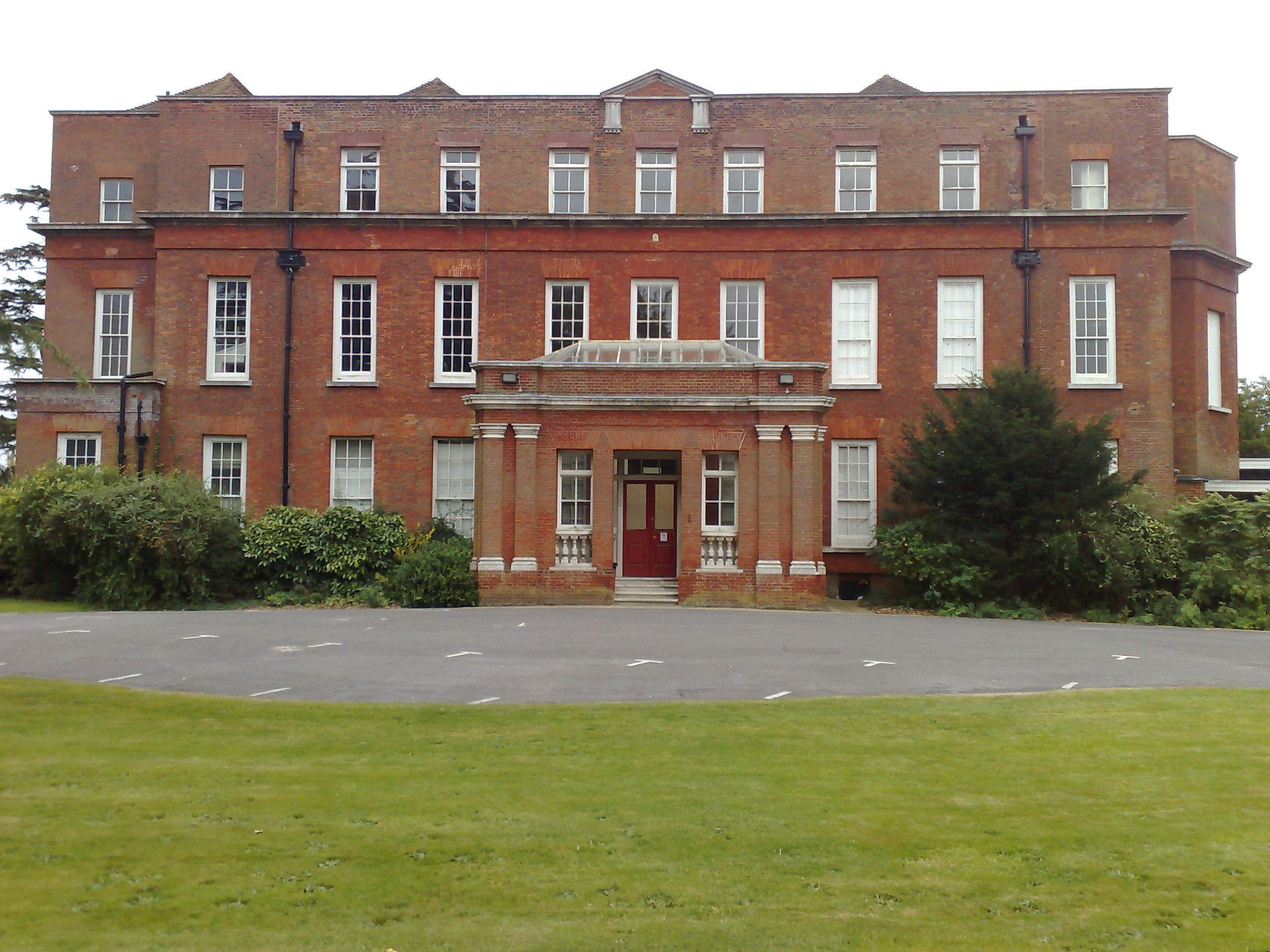
South Stoneham House.

South Stoneham House was acquired, with South Hill (situated some two miles northwest of Wessex Lane), in 1920 to house male students at University College Southampton. It was originally the manor house of the Parish of South Stoneham, which stretched along the River Itchen from the Bargate in Southampton City Centre to Eastleigh. The house itself was constructed in 1708, as the family home of Edmund Dummer, the former Surveyor of the Navy, and has been attributed to Nicholas Hawksmoor, while its gardens were laid out after 1722 by Capability Brown (though very little of the original landscaping remains).

Tradition prevailed in the house, with a collegiate atmosphere as gowns were expected to be worn to dinner and lectures and curfews were enforced.

The South Stoneham regime was also 'distinctly paternalistic. A bell was rung at 5.45 each evening and everyone settled in silence to study until another bell two hours later released us for dinner. At 10 o'clock another bell called us to prayers. Half an hour later the warden came round to all the bedrooms to check that everyone was in bed.'

— Ernest Holmes, The University of Southampton, An Illustrated History

By 1924, there was distinct pressure on space in the halls of residence, and it was clear that more rooms were needed. The existing halls were full and so South Stoneham and South Hill were extended by covering their outbuildings.

During the Second World War, the Highfield location of the college meant it was directly in the war zone itself. With Southampton being attacked, the halls of residence were also under siege: at South Stoneham windows were blown in by bombs. For much of this time, the college operated a School of Navigation, based in the communal rooms of Stoneham House.

In 1964, a concrete tower extension was added to the hall, incorporating a bar and dining hall area, both now out of use. The extension was designed as a stop-gap measure until the full development of the Montefiore and Glen Eyre sites could be pushed through, with an anticipated lifespan of just 15 years. Over four decades on, the tower was only finally removed from the university's housing stock in 2012. South Stoneham had 180 rooms over its 17 floors (16 of which were residential). For the majority of Stoneham's existence as a residence, students were fully catered for in the building's own canteen and dining hall. In latter years, as the building's use was wound down, residents were part-catered for and ate in Connaught's Galley Restaurant. Residents shared small kitchen and bathroom facilities. Much controversy had surrounded the continuous use of South Stoneham Tower and in 1997 a large wooden collar was added to the base of the tower to prevent crumbling concrete falling onto staff and students below. As the tower was originally built using asbestos, its decommission and deconstruction has provided a technical stumbling block to redevelopment of the South Stoneham site. Physical disassembly would be hugely expensive, while explosives cannot be used due to the proximity of private houses and the Grade II listed South Stoneham House. Stoneham Tower was deemed unsafe in 2012, and remained unused for accommodation until its demolition.

The university held public exhibitions in June 2018 and released a strategic document detailing the future plans for the Wessex Lane site. This will involve refurbishing and repurposing South Stoneham House, including replacement student accommodation keeping within the distinctive setting of the site. South Stoneham Tower was finally demolished in early 2022.

== Connaught Hall ==
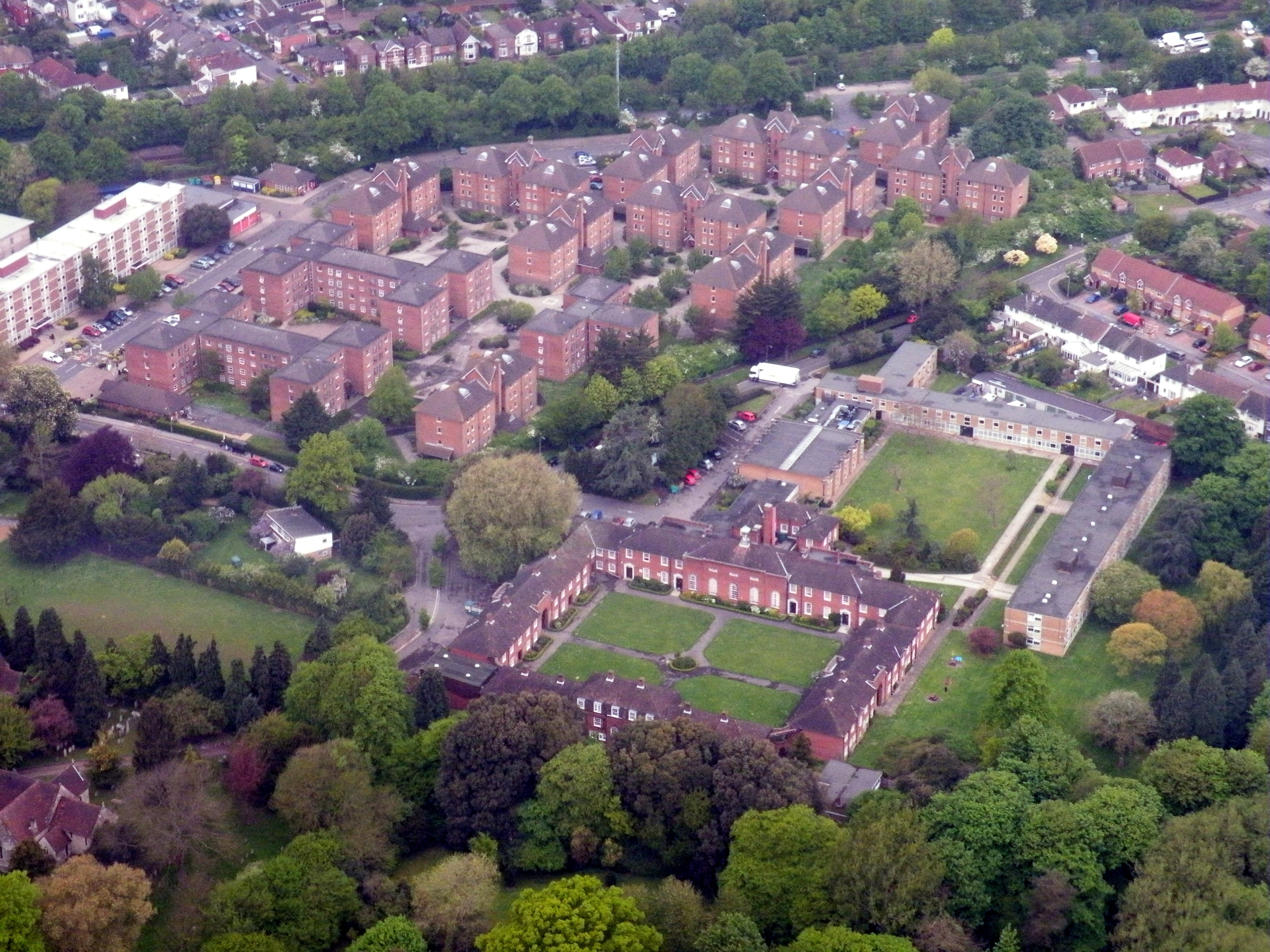
Connaught Hall bottom right, Montefiore House top left.

Connaught Hall is one of the university's original halls of residence, purpose built in 1931 for what was then the Hartley Institution. That original building, now known as the "Old Quad", was added to in 1964 (the same year the dining hall, kitchens and 17-storey tower were added to South Stoneham House) forming the "New Quad" and bringing the number of rooms to 315. Today the accommodation is primarily used by first year undergraduate students who live in the hall for one year only, but originally it was open to a wider range of university members; for example a professor of mathematics, Harold Ruse, lived in Connaught for nine years, from 1937 to 1946.

The two "quads" consist of blocks of rooms arranged into squares with scenic gardens in the centres. The Old Quad is of traditional design in the neo-Georgian architecture style and contains study bedrooms grouped around staircases and most of the communal JCR facilities. The New Quad contains the reception area and main building, the Galley Restaurant and the majority of study bedrooms. The Hall is set in a wooded grounds overlooking Monks Brook.

In late 2026, the Aspire Consortium began redevelopment of the new and old quads of Connaught Hall, as well as refurbishment of South Stoneham House, aiming to add up to 1,108 beds.

Facilities on offer within Connaught in addition to those at Montefiore halls include a large common room (larger than that at Glen Eyre), the largest ratio of space to number of residents within the university, computer room, library, music room, snooker room, a restaurant which provides part-catering for residents, gym, TV room, bar, BBQ area and laundry room.

== Montefiore Houses ==
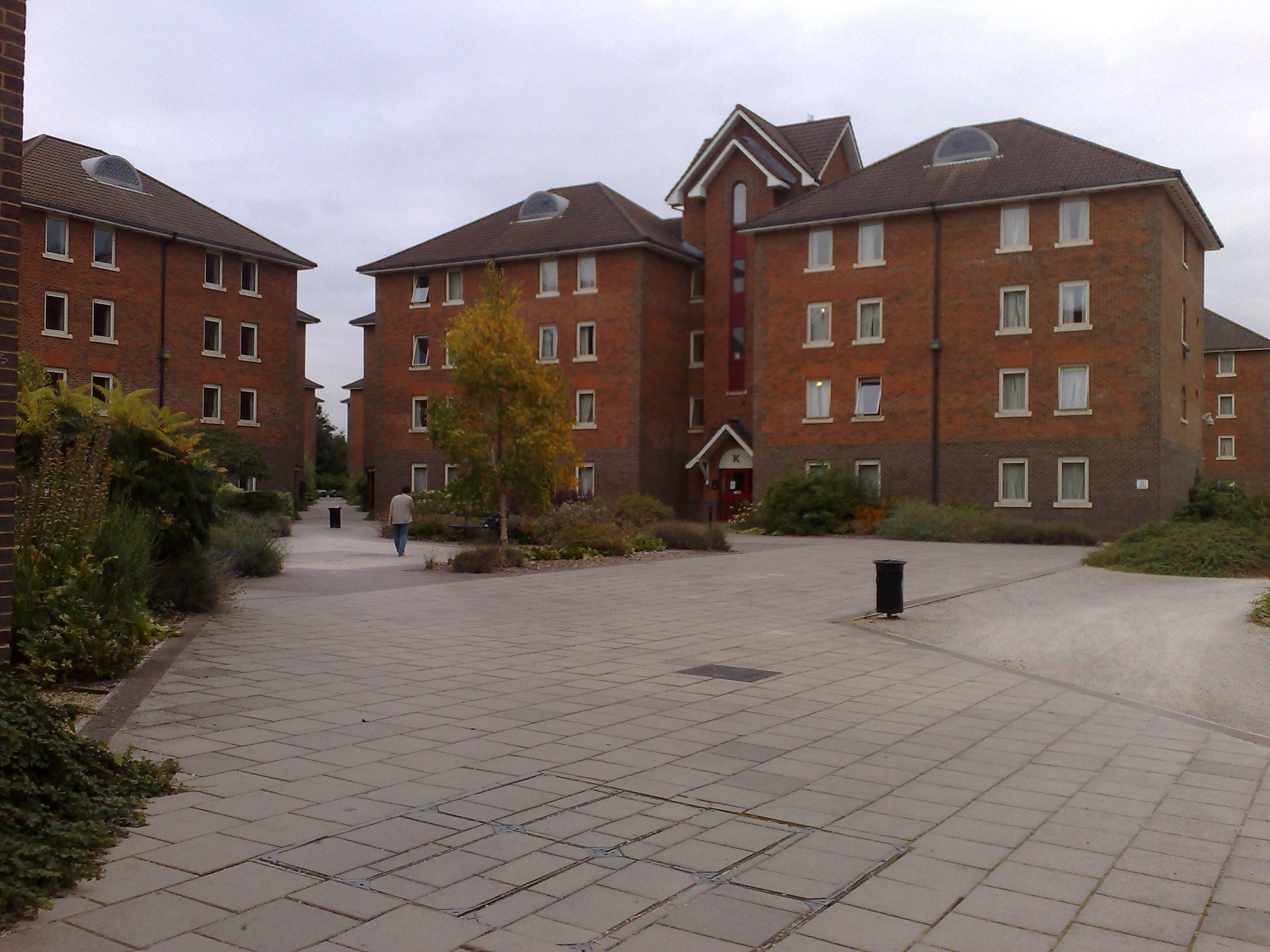
Montefiore House 3

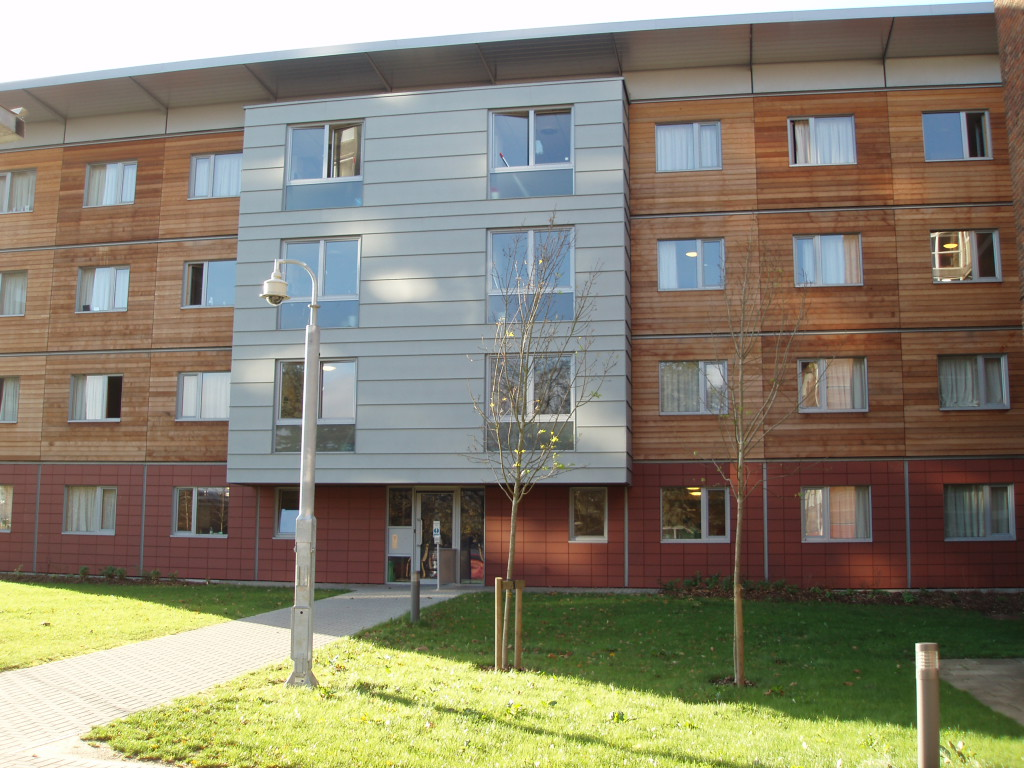
Montefiore House 4 (Block X), the latest addition to the complex, with disabled access.

Around 1925 Florence Montefiore, wife of Claude Montefiore, purchased a piece of land opposite South Stoneham House, and gave it to the House for a playing field. Claude Montefiore paid for a pavilion to be constructed on the land.

In the 1920s Florence Clark Miller was Warden of Montefiore Hall, and "had the difficult task of encouraging all those women students whose homes were in Southampton to take full part in the life of the University College".

Montefiore House (often referred to as 'Monte') as a hall of residence was opened in 1966, built on the grounds of the sports field. Montefiore halls are a self-catered residence. These original structures are now known as Montefiore A and B, and house approximately three hundred first year students in study bedrooms on individual corridor flats, with shared kitchens and other facilities, ranged over 5 floors.

Montefiore B is the largest structure. Two flats are situated on each floor, separated into two sides, 'Road end' (facing Wessex Lane) and 'Rail end' (facing the railway track). There are 21 students to each flat, except for the ground floor, where administrative staff offices and server equipment occupy some space. This has been criticised, as kitchens are often crowded where 21 students share a single kitchen.

Over the next few decades two other developments took place which replaced the old playing fields with the largest student residential centre in Southampton. Montefiore 2 was built in 1977 and consists of self-contained flats housing 400 students in flats of seven rooms each with their own study bedroom.

Montefiore 3, the largest of the Monte groupings, was opened in September 1993 and houses some 600 students grouped in flats of seven each occupying a study bedroom with en-suite facilities. This addition made Monte the largest hall of residence in Europe (in terms of the number of students that can be accommodated) at the time. Although generally well built, sound insulation was left out, and noise has been an inevitable problem.

Recently Montefiore 4 was added (replacing the link corridor and management offices between A and B blocks) which brings an additional 150 en-suite rooms, and disabled facilities to the complex.

The site overall consists of numerous residential buildings. It also has a reception that was refurbished in the 2017–2018 academic year, and the Boiler House Bar which used to be a popular student bar and hosted the Monteball, but now has lost this function. In 2022 the Boiler House Bar was (re)opened, operating Monday to Saturday.
