= Avenue Campus =

Campus of University of Southampton

Coordinates: 50.92909°N 1.40295°W

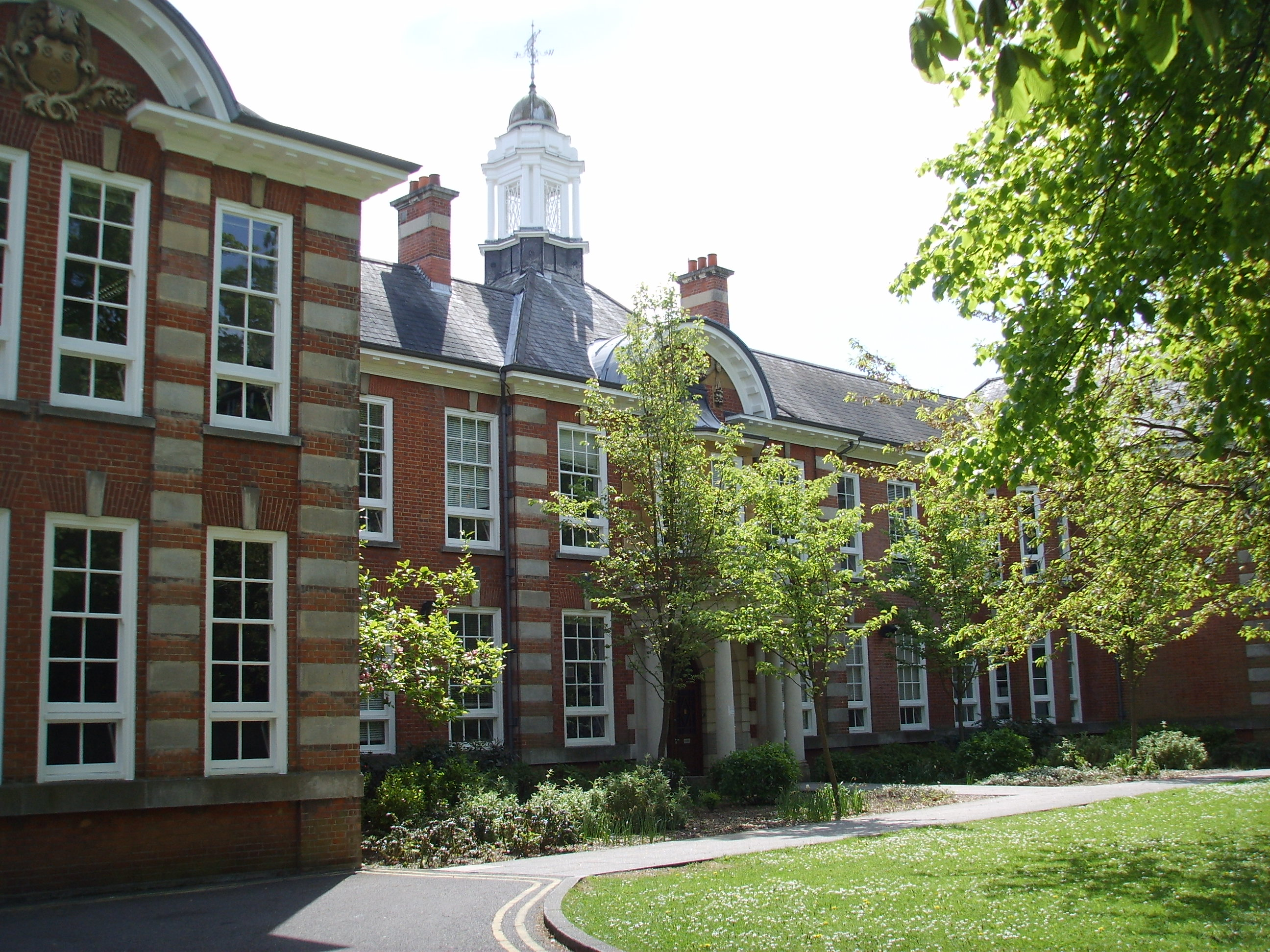
The old part of the main Parkes building on Avenue Campus, built in 1925.

Avenue Campus is a campus of the University of Southampton and is located in Southampton, England. It currently houses most of the university's Faculty of Humanities. It is located off The Avenue, borders Southampton Common and is less than a mile from the university's main Highfield Campus.

== History ==
Prior to the campus site being occupied by the university, the site was home to Taunton's School, a former grammar school for boys, of which the main building still stands as part of the main campus building. The foundation stone of the main building was laid in 1925 and the building opened a year later at a cost of £48,286. In 1969, it was reorganised as a sixth form college for boys and renamed to Richard Taunton College. The college remained on the site until 1993 when they moved to their present site on Hill Lane, on the opposite side of Southampton Common.

In December 1993, the university bought the site from Hampshire County Council for £2 million as a means of expansion. At the time, the university was seeking to expand, but due to the then planning laws the university could not expand its Highfield campus without accommodating a large number of car parking spaces in the form of three multi-storey car parks. As a result, the sought solution was to expand onto another campus and the former Taunton's school was chosen due to its close proximity to Highfield. In 1994, the London company Hawkins\Brown was appointed to design the refurbishment of the old school buildings. These included the creation of a glass fronted courtyard, a large lecture theatre being installed in the old assembly hall, a cafe in the old gym and the extension of the building to include another lecture theatre and a wing to house the academic's offices. The building was completed and occupied from late 1996 ironically soon before the requirement for car parking was removed due to a change in planning regulations that allowed instead for an improved public transport network.

The campus further expanded with the construction of the Archaeology building, opened on 10 October 2006 by Coldplay member Will Champion, who had close connections to the Archaeology academics. The building cost £2.7 million.

== Facilities ==
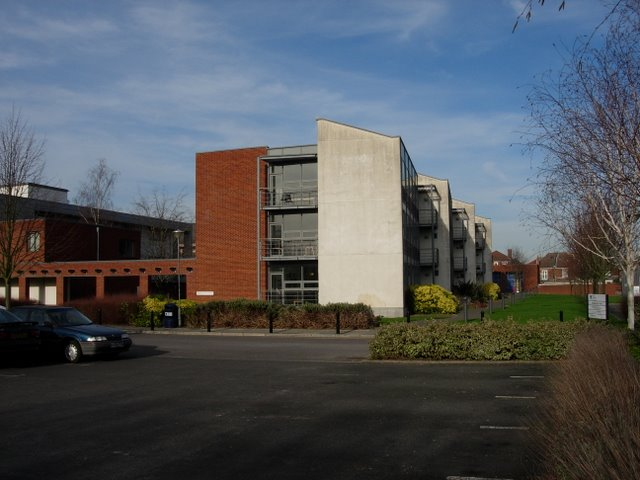
The Campus from the south, showing the main Parkes building extension (centre) and the Archaeology building (far left).

The campus consists of four buildings: the Archaeology and Burgess buildings, a former residential style building on Highfield Road and the main Parkes building, named after Reverend Dr James Parkes who founded the Parkes Institute for Jewish/Non-Jewish Relations that is based at the university.

The campus houses the university's faculty of Humanities and as a result the campus houses the offices of all the academics in the faculty (with the exception of Music which remained on the Highfield Campus where they could access the Turner Sims Concert Hall) as well as the faculty Student Office. The teaching buildings of the campus are all located in the Parkes Building and these consist of three lecture theatres and nine lecture and seminar rooms. In addition to this there are other learning aids in the form of six computer rooms, postgraduate research rooms, the Avenue Library of key course material and the Centre for Language Studies which also has a library of foreign language materials. Social facilities are solely provided by the Avenue Cafe, run by the university catering department. The grounds also contain two tennis courts.

== Location ==
The campus is located on Highfield Road on the western edge of the Highfield district of Southampton. The area to the west of the campus is part of Southampton Common, only broken by the A33 The Avenue road into central Southampton. It is located a ten-minute walk away from the main Highfield campus and the route between the two campuses is a designated cycleway. The campus is served by the Unilink U2B bus service to Bassett Green, which runs down Highfield Road, and by the Unilink U2C to the city centre and the Bluestar 1 service to Winchester and Southampton city centre which runs down the Avenue nearby.

== See also ==
- Highfield Campus
