= Boldrewood Innovation Campus =

Campus of the University of Southampton in Bassett, Southampton, UK

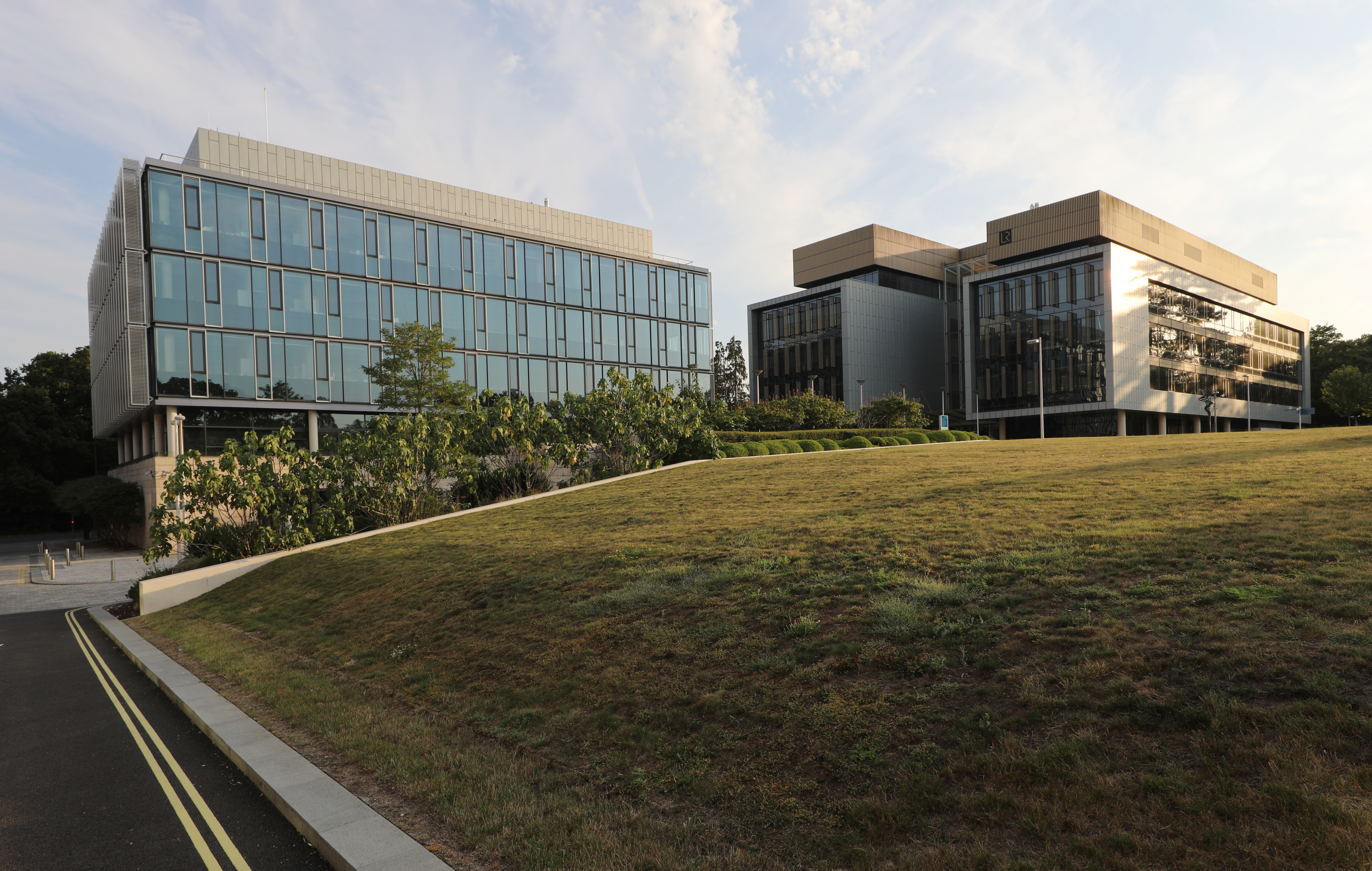
- Boldrewood Innovation Campus
- Type: Engineering, maritime engineering and business campus
- Established: 2019
- Location: Bassett, Southampton, England; 50.93721°N 1.40504°W

Boldrewood Innovation Campus is one of the University of Southampton’s campuses, located in Bassett, Southampton. The campus is home to the University's engineering and maritime engineering courses and business school. It has a number of world-class testing and research laboratories. The campus was previously home to the university’s strategic partner Lloyd’s Register.

== Facilities ==
The campus features a range of testing and research laboratories, along with numerous study facilities.

The campus is home to the largest university towing tank in the UK, measuring 138 metres in length. It is 6 metres wide, 3.5 metres deep and equipped with wave makers. The towing carriage can run at speeds up to 10m/s with models weighing up to approximately two tonnes in weight. The facility is used by both research and commercial clients, supporting conventional ship model testing as well as applications in the aerospace, energy, and transportation sectors.

The National Infrastructure Laboratory hosts 5 laboratories that provide world-leading facilities for the testing of structures, components and materials. These include the geomechanics laboratory, geotechnical centrifuge, large structures testing laboratory (LSTL), testing and structures research laboratory (TSRL), and energy laboratory.

Other facilities include fluid dynamics laboratories, a driving simulator and two unmanned vehicle laboratories.

== History ==
Boldrewood was previously the Biomedical Sciences campus of the University of Southampton, home to the School of Biological Sciences and the non-hospital base for the School of Medicine. In April 2006, the university announced plans to develop a 'professional campus' on the Boldrewood site, to house the marine services division of Lloyd's Register. In 2009, Grimshaw Architects was appointed to develop a long-term master plan for the 10-acre site. In October 2010, the Boldrewood Campus was fully closed for redevelopment, after the relocation of staff and students to the new Life Sciences building on the Highfield Campus. In 2024, Southampton Business School was relocated from Highfield to Boldrewood, replacing the space formerly occupied by Lloyd's Register.

Construction of the campus was delivered in three phases, starting in 2010 and finishing in 2019.

== Location ==
The campus is located to the west of the main Highfield campus, on Burgess Road, Southampton.
