= Sidney Kimber =

Sir Sidney Guy Kimber (5 November 1873 – 8 October 1949) was a British politician, born in Highfield, Southampton.

Kimber first became a councillor in 1910. He served as mayor of Southampton for two consecutive terms, from November 1918 to November 1920. After serving as mayor, he became an alderman. He pioneered the building of the Civic Centre and the Southampton Sports Centre (including the municipal golf course). He was knighted for his services in 1935 and later published his memoirs, Thirty Eight Years of Public Life in Southampton.
