= Florence Clark Miller =

British geographer and academic

- Born: 1889
- Died: 17 March 1967 (aged 77–78)

Academic background
- Education: University of Leeds

Academic work
- Discipline: Geographer
- Institutions: University of Southampton

Florence Clark Miller (1889-17 March 1967) was a British geographer and academic.

== Early life and education ==
Miller was born in 1889. Her first degree was in History from the University of Leeds; she graduated in 1911 and became a school teacher.

== Career ==
In 1921 she became lecturer in geography at the University College of Southampton. She was warden of Montefiore Hall and in the 1920s "had the difficult task of encouraging all those women students whose homes were in Southampton to take full part in the life of the University College". In 1929 she was one of the organisers of an exhibition organised by the Southampton Geographical Association, with the aim of supporting teachers to be informed about developments in geographical science. Miller gave financial support to the student geography society. During the Second World War, she taught map-reading to Royal Air Force personnel.

She was appointed as senior lecturer in 1945, and in 1949 the department of geography split from the department of economics and Miller became head of the new department. She was one of the founding members of Southampton University's senate. Miller retired in 1954 and died in 1967.

== Legacy ==
Miller was described as "a most original teacher who caught and easily held the minds of students". The University of Southampton awards an annual Florence Miller prize in geography in her memory, established in 1998.

Miller was interested in local history, and continued to work on this during her retirement.

== Publications ==
- "Early Maps of China and the Mediterranean", 1921, in The Geographical Teacher, volume 11.
- "Miss K.C. Boswell", 1954, in Geography, volumes 37-8 (obituary of her colleague).
