= Unilink =

Transportation Service

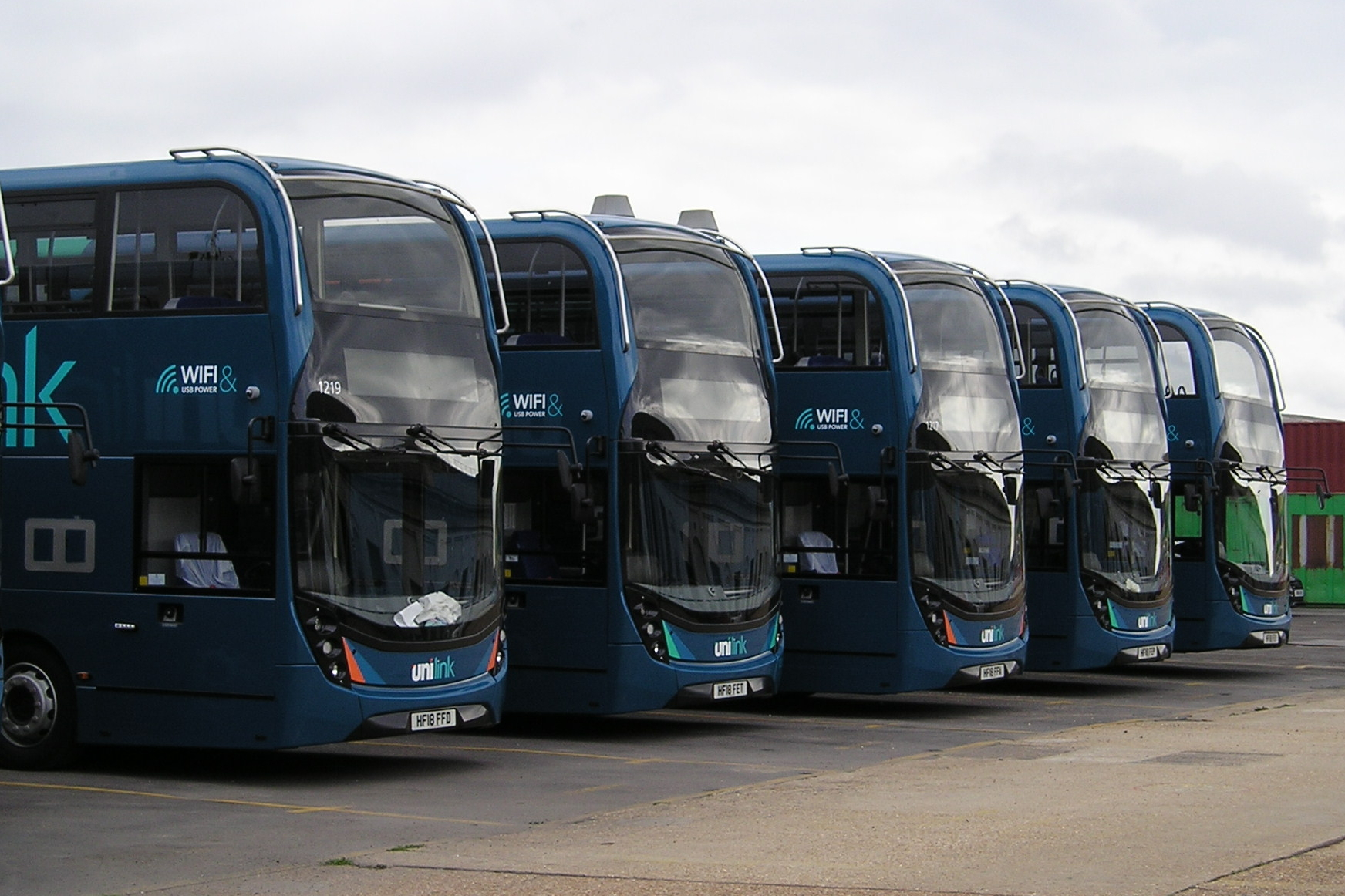
- A line-up of Alexander Dennis Enviro400 MMC buses used on Unilink services.
- Parent: Bluestar (Go South Coast)
- Founded: 1998; 28 years ago
- Headquarters: Southampton Empress Road Bus Depot
- Service area: University of Southampton
- Service type: Bus
- Routes: 6
- Depots: Empress Rd Southampton
- Fleet: 32
- Operator: Bluestar (part of the Go South Coast division of the Go-Ahead Group)
- Website: www.unilinkbus.co.uk

Unilink is the branded bus service operated under contract and serving the University of Southampton in Hampshire, England. The service was created in 1998 following the university's expansion onto several new campuses, requiring new transport links between them. The current contractor of the service is Bluestar, part of the Go-Ahead Group, who took over in 2008. The service also encourages use by members of the public outside the university community.

== History ==
=== Foundations ===
The foundations for the service began with the opening of the Southampton Oceanography Centre in 1996. Located in Southampton Docks, this was the first of the university's campuses that were not either within walking distance of the main campus or were self-contained (whose students had no need to travel to a different campus – Winchester School of Art and Southampton General Hospital being the main examples). As a result, the university launched the student only shuttle service to serve the new campus. The service ran every half-hour with one service every hour running via Avenue Campus while the other ran via Portswood. The service was run by the university's Business Services division.

=== First Southampton ===
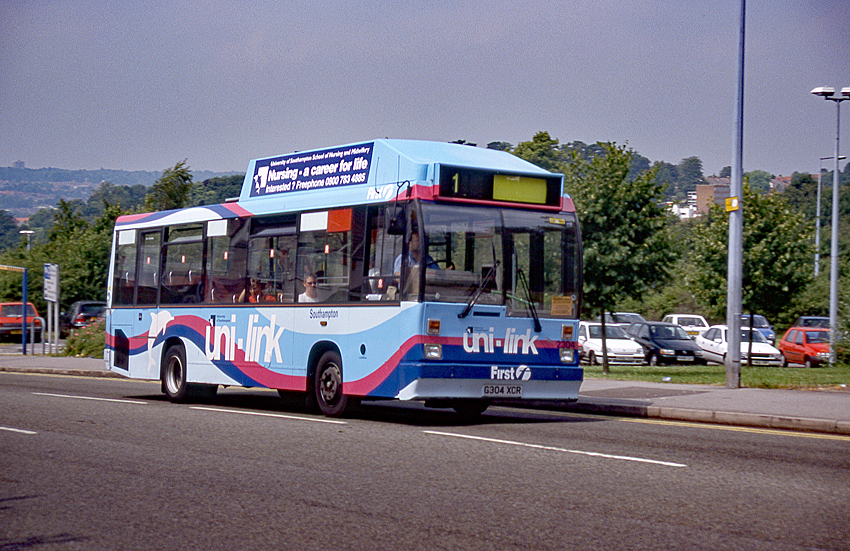
UniLink livery used by First Hants & Dorset from 1998 to 2001

In 1998, the university made a three-year agreement with FirstGroup's local subsidiary, First Southampton to run a new bus service under the Uni-link name. First's service launched on 21 September 1998 and saw the introduction of three new routes, 101, 102 and 103, operated under the Uni-link branding. First also rerouted their 4, 6, 11, 13 and 20 routes so that they would run closer to the university allowing better connections with other areas of Southampton. The company also ran two night services, labelled the 104 and the 105.

=== Minerva Accord ===
Past Logos

The Uni-Link logo used by First and Minerva Accord. From 1997 to 2008.

Bluestar Uni-Link Logo used from 2008 until 2013.

In September 2001, as the university's agreement with First finished, the university made some changes to the service following some dissatisfaction and some bad experiences. The university set up Uni-link as a separate company and put the contract for the operation of the service out to tender. The first contract winner was Minerva Accord, who started their 5-year contract at the beginning of the 2001/2002 academic year.

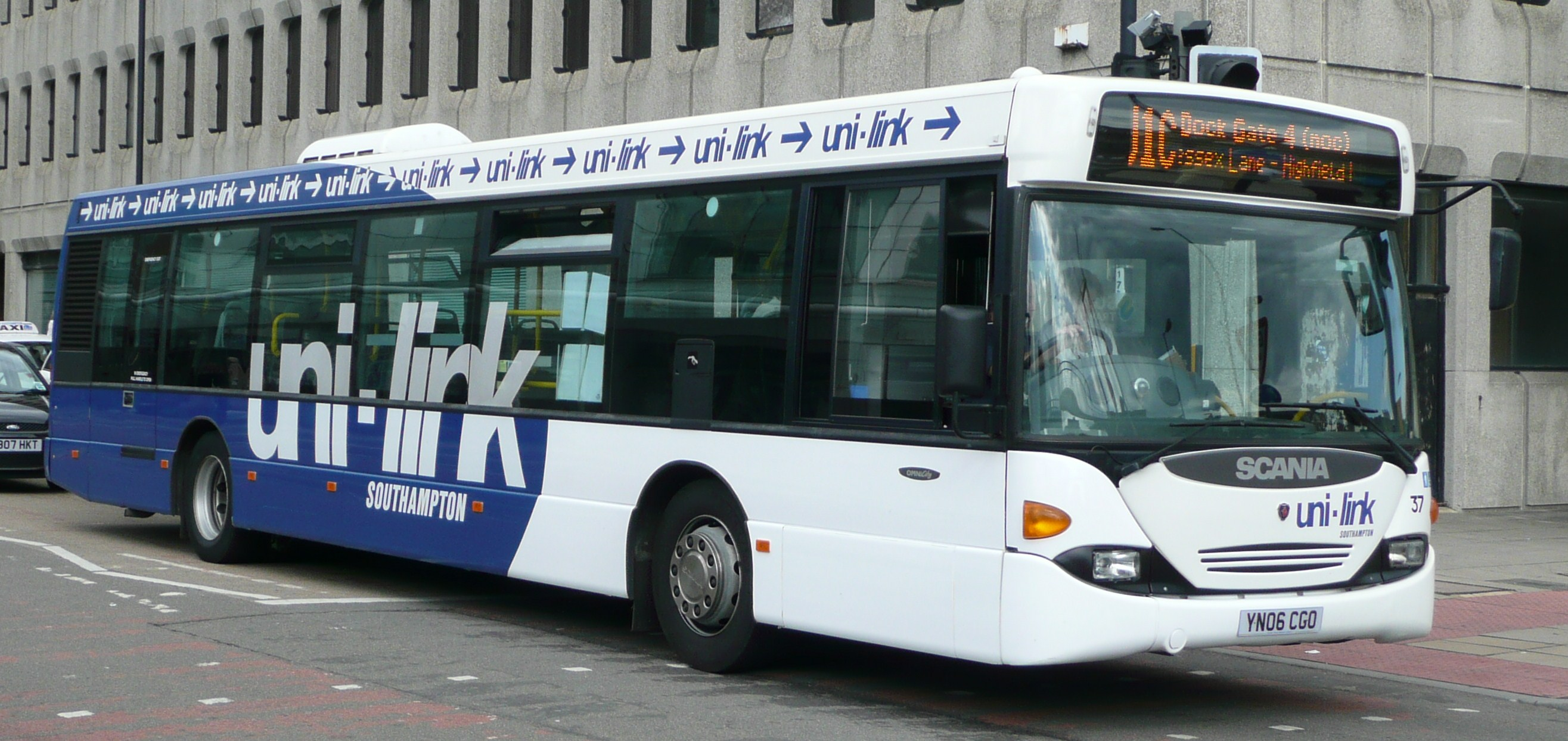
A Scania OmniCity in Accord Livery.

At launch, the company ran two main routes, the U1 and the U2, with a number of smaller routes and variations also in existence. Later in the life of the company, Uni-link launched the U6 and the U9 routes. As some of these routes, especially the U1, was used very heavily the company received various grants that allowed their fleets to expand. The company added its last route in September 2005 when it was awarded a five-year contract by Southampton City Council to run the City-link service shuttle service in Southampton city centre. This nearly doubled their passenger numbers, adding one million passengers per annum.

Uni-link also began trials of articulated buses and Wi-Fi on some of their fleet during 2007.

=== Bluestar ===
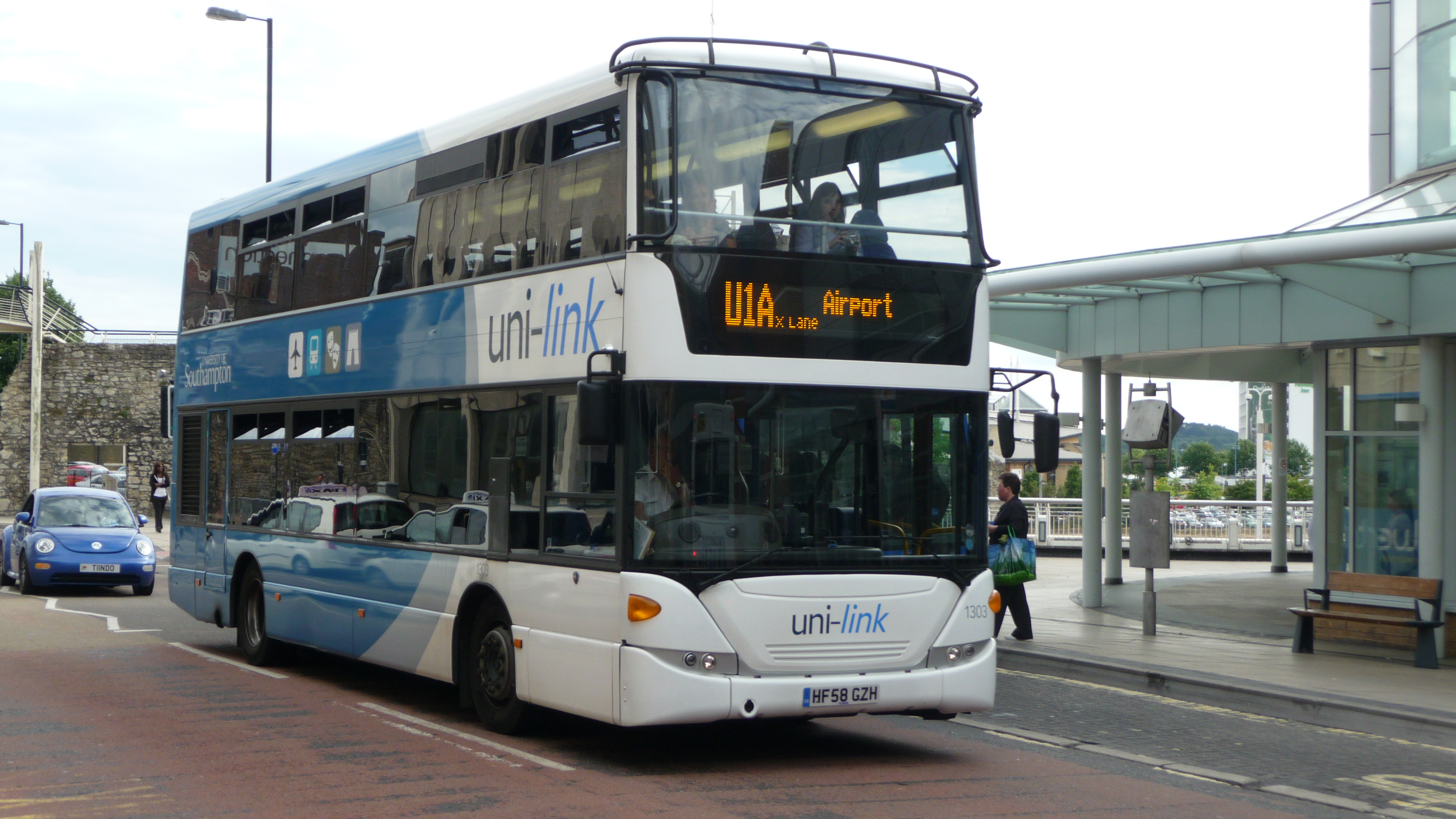
UniLink's first livery contracted under Bluestar, from 2008 to 2013

Local bus company Bluestar were named as the winners of the next ten-year contract to run the service. The service launched on 29 September 2008, coinciding with the new university year. The new company used a fleet initially composed of five new vehicles under a £3m investment with wheelchair ramps and two doors at the rear. Later in October 2008, Bluestar had also trialled a tri-axle Scania OmniLink bus with a capacity of 97 passengers for one month on its U1 service.

In March 2012, free Wi-Fi was installed on all Uni-link and Bluestar buses as a result of a £4.5 million investment from Transport for South Hampshire. In July 2013, Uni-link changed their smartcard system to 'The Key' smartcard that adheres to ITSO specifications and is currently used by several other companies owned by the Go-Ahead Group. The smartcard allowed Uni-link pass holders access onto Bluestar's central Southampton services (and vice versa) and allowed for greater deals with other Go South Coast operators. However it meant that the older cards, which included the University of Southampton student ID card, would not work with the new system leading to some controversy among the student population.

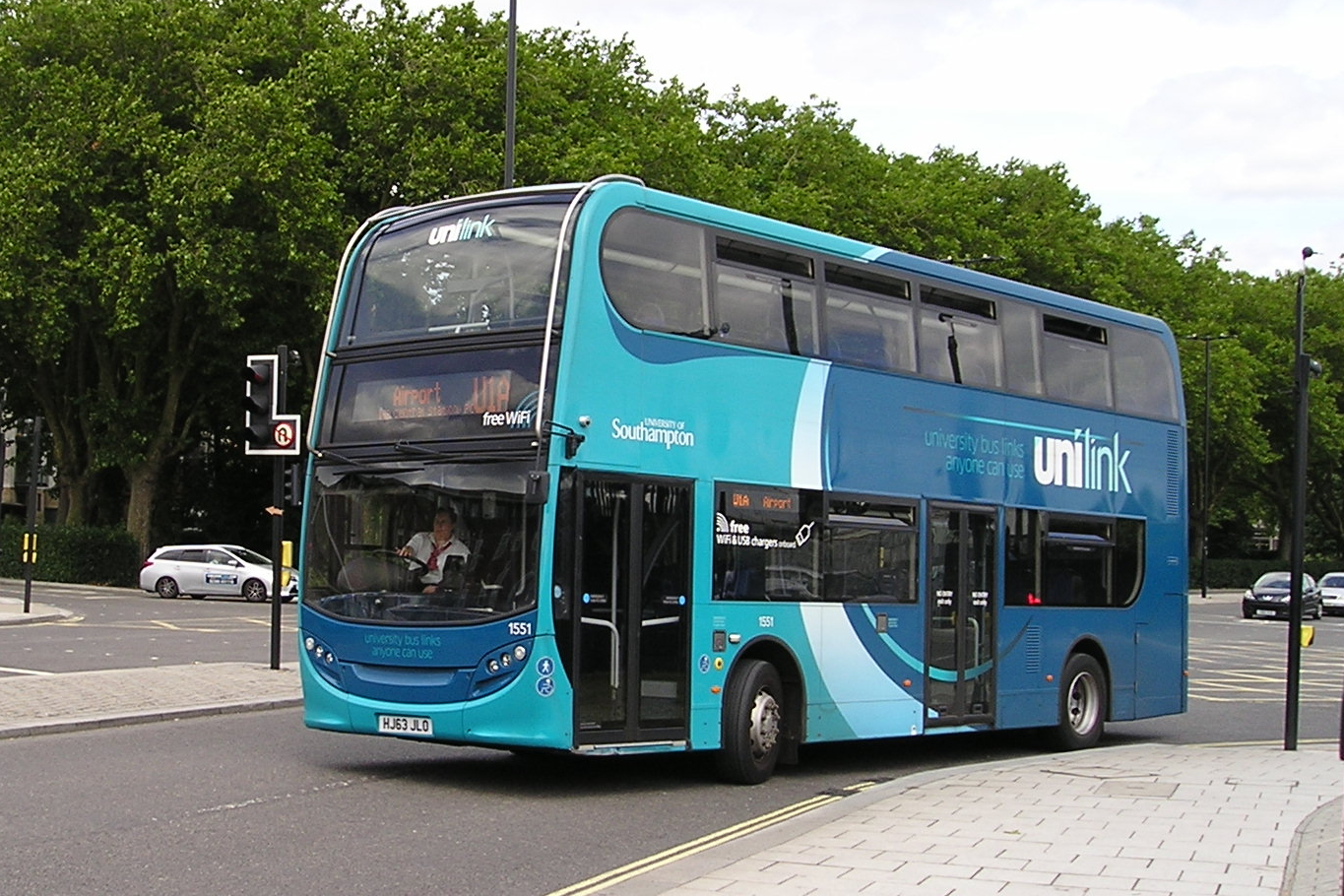
UniLink's second livery contracted under Bluestar, from 2013 to 2018

In January 2013, Bluestar ordered around 30 ADL Enviro400 double deckers, with two Scania CN230UB Omnicitys and five Wright Eclipse Urban 2's to mark their rebranding of the service from the old white and blue colour scheme to the new turquoise and blue-green colour scheme.

In December 2017, during a joint announcement by Bluestar and the University of Southampton it was revealed that the contract between the University of Southampton and Bluestar for the latter to operate the service would be extended to run to 2028. To mark this, they made a £7m investment into new buses to replace the existing fleet by purchasing new ADL Enviro400 MMCs.

In September 2023, Unilink introduced two new routes connecting Winchester and Chilworth to the university campus under routes U7 and U8 respectively.

== Fleet ==
Unilink's current fleet is made up of Alexander Dennis Enviro400 MMC's which went into service in September 2018 which feature a refreshed turquoise green livery with different colour stripes down the side. They both replaced the double decker and single decker fleet used previously and are used on all routes. The old fleet has since been reallocated to Bluestar to help with passenger increase schemes and to replace older Bluestar buses. All buses are maintained by Bluestar at Southampton Empress Road or Eastleigh Chickenhall Lane.

== See also ==
- List of bus operators of the United Kingdom
- University of Southampton
