= Highfield, Southampton =

Suburb of Southampton, England

Coordinates: 50.93°N 1.40°W

Highfield
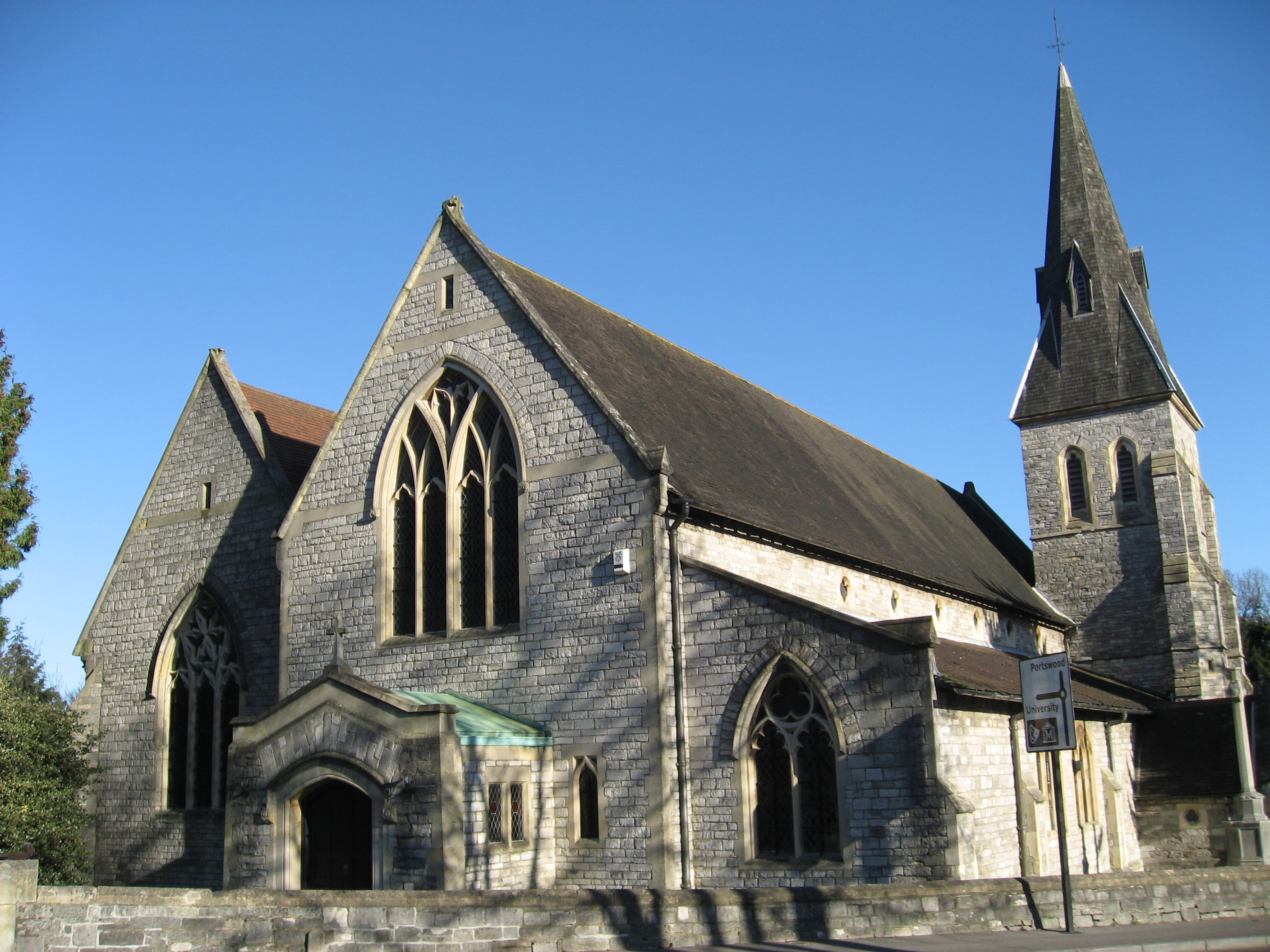
- Highfield Church building

- Location within Southampton
- Unitary authority: Southampton
- Ceremonial county: Hampshire
- Region: South East
- Country: England
- Sovereign state: United Kingdom
- Post town: SOUTHAMPTON
- Postcode district: SO17
- Dialling code: 023
- Police: Hampshire and Isle of Wight
- Fire: Hampshire and Isle of Wight
- Ambulance: South Central
- UK Parliament: Southampton Test

Highfield is a suburb of Southampton, England. The suburb is situated to the north of the city centre, and is bounded by (clockwise from West) Southampton Common, Bassett, Swaythling and Portswood. Highfield is home to the main campus of the University of Southampton, which is built on a former brickfield.

== History ==
Old maps of Southampton suggest that the name originates from "Hayfield" or "Hay field". As with most suburbs of Southampton, and as the name suggests, Highfield's origins are very much as a rural district.

Highfield Church, officially named Christ Church, began as a chapel of ease serving the parish of South Stoneham. It was built in 1847 and originally (and, officially, still is) named "Christ Church, Portswood". The architect was Joshua Brandon, who died before the building was completed and is buried in the churchyard.

A number of large country houses dominated the area, including Highfield House, Highfield Cottage, Uplands (formerly "The Rosaries" or "The Rosary"), Heather Deane, Oak Mount, Ivy Bank and Highfield Lodge (not to be confused with the lodge to Highfield House). These houses are all shown on an 1897 Ordnance Survey map. Some of these buildings, including Ivy Bank and Oak Mount, still stand, albeit in somewhat altered surroundings. Highfield House and Uplands have both been demolished.

A deed of covenant was signed in 1846 to establish Highfield Church of England School. The building, which stands next to the church, was opened in 1849.

Highfield House had a number of naval connections in the 19th century, being owned by Vice-Admiral Foote, Rear-Admiral Morier and then William Ogden. In 1861, Uplands was listed in the Post Office Directory as "The Rosaries". It was occupied by Revd Thomas McCalmont, a Church of England cleric whose family originated from Ireland. In 1877, Alfred (Thomas' third son) became Mayor of Southampton at the age of 26. Alfred died a year later, and after a further two years, his elder brother Frederick also died, aged 34. Two stained glass windows in Highfield Church commemorate the clergyman and his sons.

In 1883, Highfield House was purchased by James Ireland, a tailor and outfitter.

The Southampton Tramways Company, which was later subsumed into the Southampton Corporation transport department, purchased Highfield Stables in 1888. The company had been stabling their horses (for horse-drawn trams) there for some time previously. The stables could house 31 horses. Several additional buildings were erected to accommodate omnibuses and trams. Electric trams arrived at the depot in 1904.

In 1913, Uplands was put up for sale. The house was demolished with Taunton's School being erected in its place. The school was founded in 1752 because of a bequest left by Richard Taunton, a wine importer and merchant and cousin of Isaac Watts. The school had originally been located in Windsor Terrace and in 1865 moving to New Road, both in the city centre. A number of factors, not least World War I, delayed the laying of the foundation stone of the new building in Highfield until 1925.

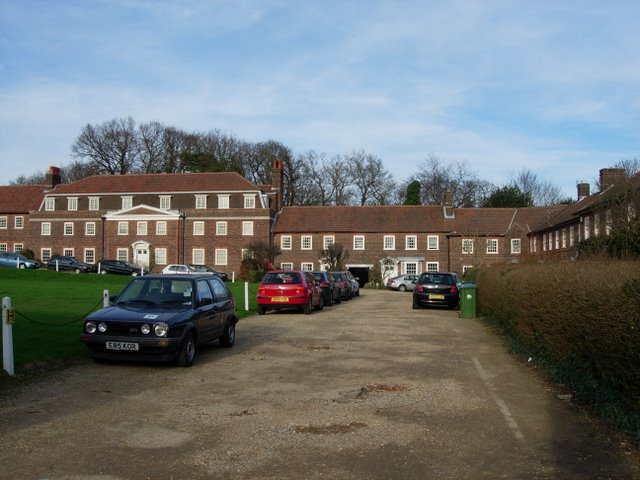
Glebe Court, part of the Uplands Estate

Between 1922 and 1936, most of the Uplands Estate was built. Designed by Herbert Collins, the estate is now a designated conservation area. The estate comprises 200 houses and flats in Collins' distinctive Georgian style. Collins made use of a stream that runs through Highfield, making it a feature of his open green areas and using it to feed an ornamental pond.

On the first Sunday in Lent in 1941, Highfield Church was targeted by the Luftwaffe. Eight bombs fell around the building, but none hit the target. Although some damage was sustained, the following morning's 8 o'clock service was held regardless.

Taunton's School, a grammar school at the time, became a sixth form college in 1967.

By 1969, the tram sheds had been derelict for around twenty years and so in that year volunteers from the Southampton Sixth Form Union demolished the depot.

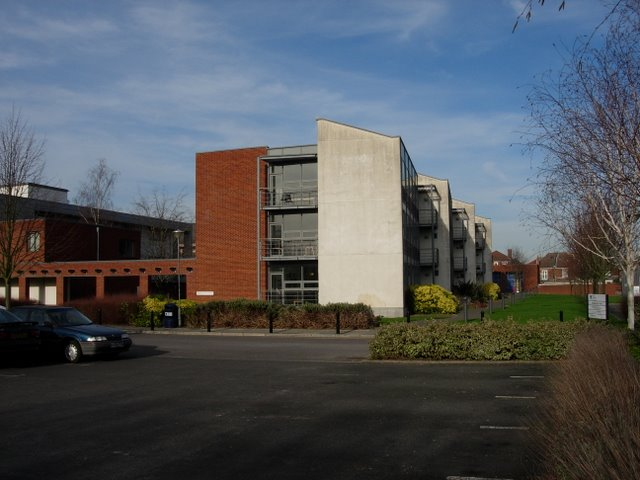
The Avenue Campus extension to the Taunton's College buildings

Taunton's College (as it was renamed) merged with Hill College in Shirley in 1997. The new college retains the name Taunton's College but is located solely on the old Hill College campus, formerly the Girls' Grammar School. The Highfield site was sold to the University of Southampton who moved their arts faculty into the building, extending it and renaming it Avenue Campus. The Avenue Campus also occupies the land which previously housed the Highfield tram depot; the archaeology building now stands there.

== Notable residents ==
- Commodore Edward J. Smith, captain of the RMS Titanic
- R. J. Mitchell, designer of the Spitfire
- Pete Thomas, musician and composer
