= Southampton Citybus =

Former bus company in Southampton, England

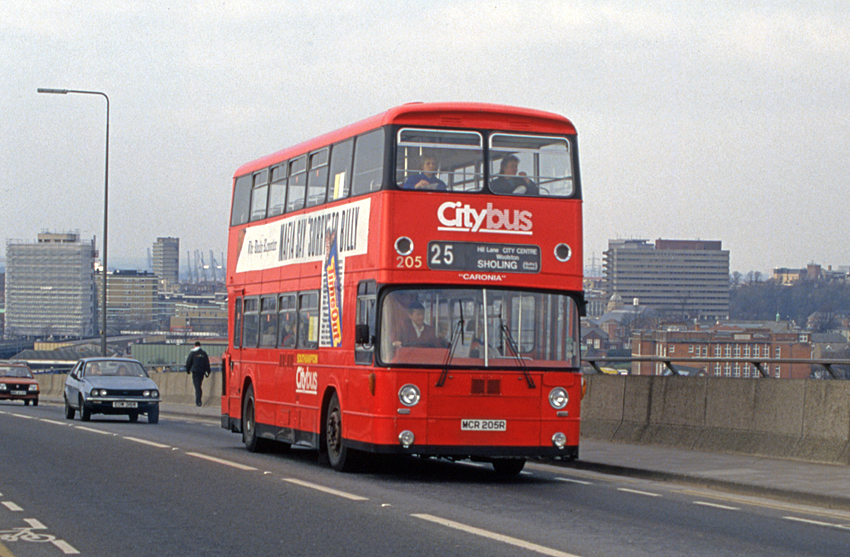
- Southampton Citybus Leyland Atlantean crossing Itchen Bridge
- Parent: Southampton City Council
- Commenced operation: 1986
- Ceased operation: 28 July 1997
- Headquarters: Southampton
- Service area: Southampton
- Service type: Bus services

Southampton Citybus was a bus operator which operated local services throughout the English city of Southampton. It was formed in 1898 as Southampton Corporation Transport. In 1986, as a result of deregulation an 'arm's length' limited company was formed in the name of Southampton Citybus and the coat of arms of the City of Southampton was removed, and replaced with the new branding. The company was owned by the town council until 1954, and the city council until 1993. It was then bought by its employees, in 1997 it was purchased by FirstGroup and was part of First Hampshire & Dorset until their Southampton operations ceased in February 2023.

== History ==
Southampton Citybus was formed in 1898 as Southampton Corporation Transport when the town council took over the Southampton Tramways Company. The company initially operated a fleet of horse-drawn trams and buses, replacing them with electric trams in 1901. A motorbus service was launched in 1901 but proved unsuccessful, and was withdrawn until 1919, when it was reintroduced. The tram network was expanded during the 1920s, but by 1929 it was decided that no new tram services would be introduced.

A ferry operation across the River Itchen was acquired in 1934, and operated until 1977 when a bridge was opened in its place. Tram services began to be closed in the 1940s, with the last operation abandoned in 1950. The bus network continued largely unchanged until 1986, when the company was reformed as an arm's length operation and renamed Southampton Citybus.

Southampton Citybus was owned by the city council until 1993. It operated a fleet of around 150 vehicles, and a small coaching division named Red Ensign. Following the Transport Act 1985 and the deregulation of the bus market, it faced aggressive competition from Southern Vectis, the dominant Isle of Wight bus company, which started Solent Blue Line in 1987 as a bid to expand onto the mainland, competing on some of the same major routes as Citybus. In response Citybus introduced crewed AEC Routemasters.

=== Privatisation ===
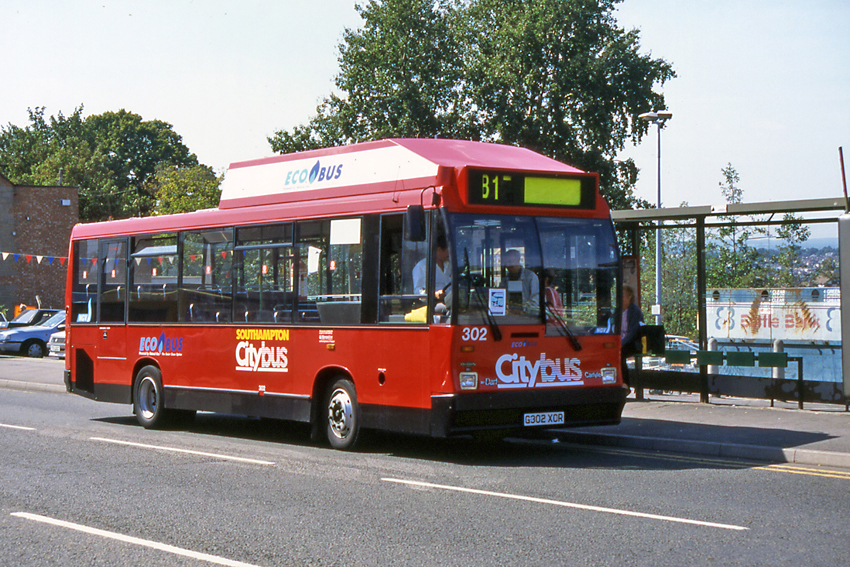
Dennis Dart 9SDL Carlyle adapted to use LNG

The council sold the company to its employees in 1993 for around £3 million. Following this Citybus introduced sixteen natural gas powered Dennis Dart buses into regular service, the largest such fleet in the UK. Much of the fleet of 160 buses was replaced during this period, and the company was profitable.

=== Purchase by First ===
On 28 July 1997 the company was purchased by FirstGroup for around £11 million. After a brief period where the name was kept, the service became First Southampton, and later part of First Hampshire & Dorset. In 2014, First Hampshire & Dorset introduced a new brand for high-frequency routes in Southampton, CityRed, with a red variant of the First livery, marking a return of the traditional Southampton colour, although eventually all buses sported the CityRed branding. Some of these buses carry the slogan "Southampton's city buses". In 2022, after 25 years of operations, First announced they would withdraw their CityRed bus services from Southampton in February 2023.
