= ACE Cougar =

Step-entrance midibus chassis

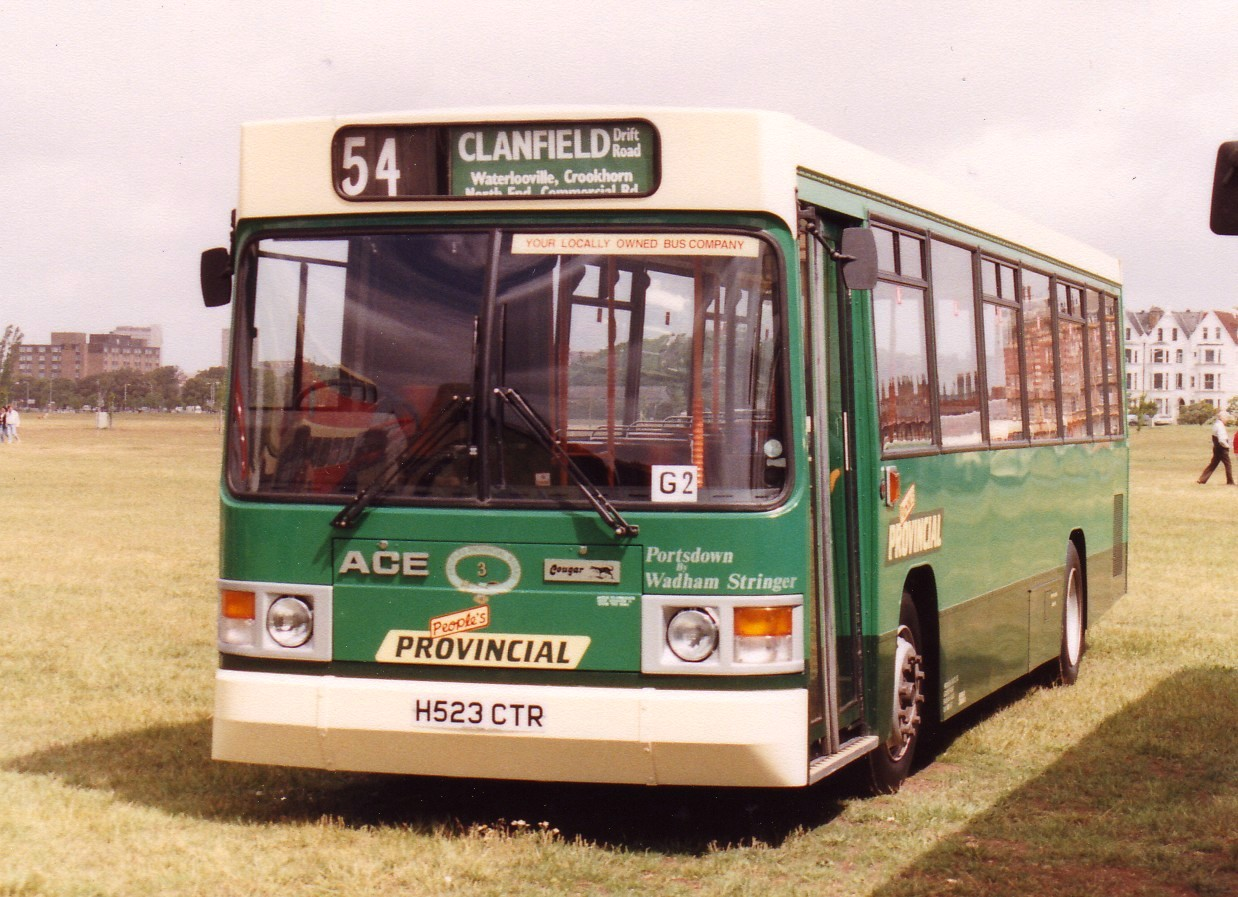
- The Wadham Stringer bodied ACE Cougar in People's Provincial livery in June 1991

Overview
- Manufacturer: Alternative Chassis Engineering
- Production: 1990
- Assembly: Huddersfield, England

Body and chassis
- Doors: 1
- Floor type: Step entrance

Powertrain
- Engine: Perkins Phaser
- Capacity: 43 seated, 16 standing
- Power output: 180 brake horsepower (130 kW)
- Transmission: Allison MT643 four-speed automatic

Dimensions
- Length: 10.5 metres (34 ft)
- Width: 2.3 metres (7 ft 7 in)

The ACE Cougar was a type of midibus built by Alternative Chassis Engineering (ACE) in England in the early 1990s. It did not prove successful and only two were built.

== Details ==
The ACE Cougar was designed to reuse Leyland National components wherever possible. Built with a completely flat floor with only two steps up from the front entrance door and being 10.5 m (34 ft) long and 2.3 m (7 ft 7 in) wide, the Wadham Stringer Portsdown bodied Cougar had a seating capacity for 43 seated and 16 standing passengers. The Cougar chassis was powered by a 180 brake horsepower (130 kW) rear inline mounted Perkins Phaser turbo engine, which was coupled to an Allison MT643 four speed automatic transmission. The chassis additionally featured air suspension, 16 in × 8 in (410 mm × 200 mm) steel drum brakes, and was built with an alloy steel frame using five welded box section crossmembers.

== Production and operations ==
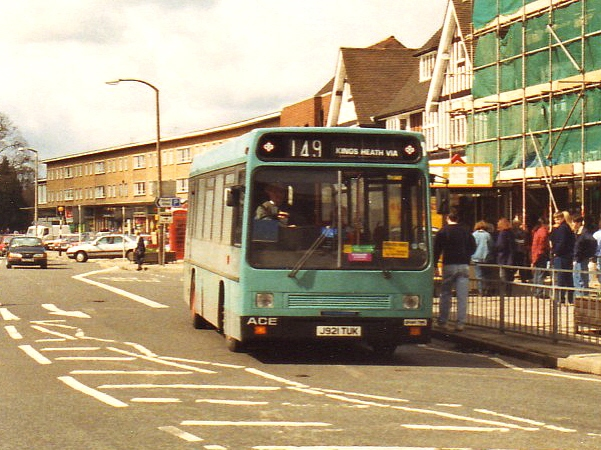
The Willowbrook ACE Cougar operating in Solihull with Caves Bus Services in April 1994

The Cougar, built at ACE's factory in Milnsbridge, Huddersfield as part of ACE's 'Predator' range, was launched at the Expocoach '90 expo in October 1990. The first Cougar was bodied by Wadham Stringer and sold to People's Provincial in 1990. Provincial director James Freeman saw the vehicle as a possible replacement for the company's large fleet of Leyland Nationals, however only one was ever delivered. It was the only full-size bus bought new by Provincial as an independent company following privatisation in 1987. Provincial was taken over by First Hampshire & Dorset in 1995, with the Cougar continuing in service with First following a complete refurbishment in 1998 before being sold into preservation in 2004.

The second carried Willowbrook Warrior bodywork, a body rarely applied to new vehicles. It was completed in 1991 and was initially painted in a demonstrator livery, but was sold to West Midlands independent Caves Bus Services later in the year. Caves closed down in June 1999, and the Cougar was sold to a private owner on Valentia Island.

== Intended developments ==
Both Cougars built were technically described as ACE Cougar V models. This was to differentiate them from the Cougar VI, a full-size 12 metres (39 ft) variant which Alternative Chassis Engineering intended to build for sale to London Regional Transport. The company also intended to create 30 manufacturing jobs producing the vehicles with a production line capacity of two Cougars a day. However, ACE was wound up in October 1992, having produced no further Cougars.
