= Southampton Corporation Transport =

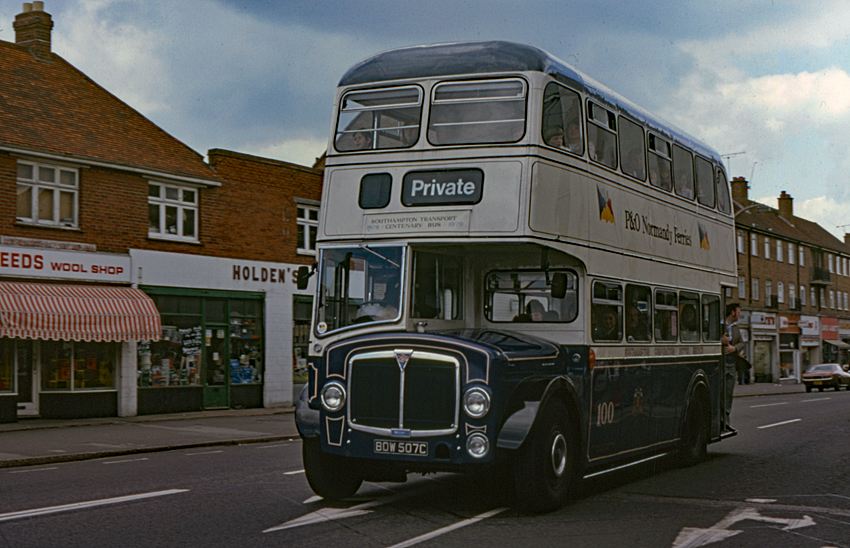
- AEC Regent V Centenary bus in the 1979 Centenary Cavalcade
- Commenced operation: 1919
- Ceased operation: 1993
- Service area: Southampton
- Service type: Bus services
- Depots: Portswood; Shirley

Southampton Corporation Transport motor bus services started in 1919 as a successor to Southampton Corporation Tramways. After Southampton achieved city status in 1964 it was renamed Southampton City Transport. In 1986, as a result of deregulation it became Southampton Citybus, an arms-length company that was sold to the staff in 1993. It continued trading as Southampton Citybus until it was bought by First Bus in 1997.

== Beginning ==
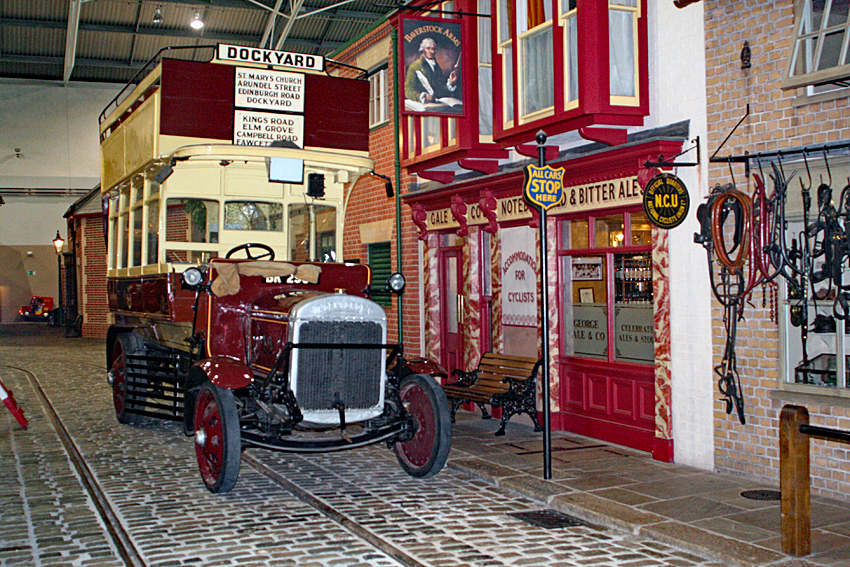
Thornycroft J bus in the Milestones Museum, Basingstoke

Bus transport started in Southampton shortly after World War I in 1919 with the first route starting on 31 July of that year, carrying the legend "Southampton Corporation Tramways". The route ran from the Clock Tower to Winchester Road (St. James Corner). It went via Bedford Place and St. James Road. Over the years, the Corporation extended the network, with routes going to many places over the City, including the Floating Bridge, Royal Pier, and Millbrook Road. In the earlier days buses were stored at Highfield Depot, and the buses used were Thornycroft "J" type fitted with double-deck, open top bodies built at the Portswood works.

Travelling by bus was becoming more popular and in response to this, in 1920 several routes in the eastern side of the city were trialled, including a short route from Bitterne Church to Sholing. The Bitterne Church to Sholing route however was withdrawn in January 1921, but was reinstated in September 1922.

Another route that was not attracting as many passengers as hoped was from the Floating Bridge to Tanners Brook, which was withdrawn in March 1921. The Corporation was making a loss on these bus services so a major change was needed and in 1921, new buses were bought; these being Leyland chassis "E" Type which the Corporation fitted with a single deck body with a front entrance, thereby distinguishing it from the open top buses that were previously used. The single deck buses proved their worth on the Clock Tower to Winchester Road route.

In 1925, more new buses were ordered and the name was changed from 'Southampton Corporation Tramways' to the 'Southampton Corporation Motor Service', and also a new livery was added to the fleet, consisting of blue upper and lower panels, divided by a white waist rail. Problems were being found with the Bitterne route by 1925, having been extended to Woolston; the problem being that the roads were falling into serious disrepair. 1926 saw the introduction of several new routes, which were an alternative from Woolston to Sholing, meeting the demand for bus travel on the eastern side of the City; another route being from Grand Theatre to Burgess Road via Hill Lane.

Over the years, new buses were being delivered of various models; Guy, Leyland, Thornycroft and AEC. More routes were also being added with routes now going to Butts Road, Swaythling and Freemantle, thus expanding the existing network. A new bus garage was opened on 1 January 1932 on St. Denys' Road – Portswood Depot, which offered the Corporation a much-needed increase in storage capacity and overhaul facilities.

== World War II ==
The first buses that were used on bus services in Southampton were petrol but in the 1930s the diesel engine was developed and was proving its worth. During 1934 and 1935 considerable extensions and more new routes were added to the network. There was also further trials of different sorts of buses. In 1937, the Conservative government gave approval for The Southampton Corporation Act, which gave the Corporation the powers to abandon the Tramways, although it wouldn't be until December 1949 when the trams would finally close.

In 1939 with the start of World War II a number of regulations were introduced by the Home Office, including total blackouts from sunset to sunrise. This meant that buses had to run without lights, though an emergency lighting system was included. Some restrictions had been eased by March 1940, which meant certain minor extensions and modifications could be carried out, and school bus services were introduced. However tranquillity would not last long as the last three months in 1940 saw the Southampton area suffer very badly in the Blitz, but fortunately only one bus, No. 43, and one tram, No. 31, was destroyed by enemy action.

As many men went to war there was a shortage of staff to operate the services. As a result, women were employed to be conductresses and as their number gradually increased, women were then trained on trams and buses as drivers. Another problem with the war was that there was a shortage of fuel and rubber for tyres. At the end of the war the Transport Department's most immediate problem was the mechanical and structural condition of its fleet of trams and buses after 6 years of conflict. The blue livery, proving unsuitable as it soon began to fade, was replaced with a new livery of red and cream. Large numbers of Guy Arab IIs were ordered to replace pre-war buses, which were due for withdrawal and as tram replacements. The new buses also meant that new routes could be operated and increasing frequencies of existing services could be achieved. Before the war, the Transport Department had planned for trolley-buses to replace the trams but it was felt that they would be route-bound just like the trams.

== After the War ==
After the trams finished in December 1949, the Shirley Tram Depot was converted into a bus garage and was first used on 16 July 1950, therefore reducing the number of empty trips from Shirley to Portswood, saving time and resources. In 1951 with housing developments rapidly being built in Millbrook and Harefield, new bus services were needed. Two years after the abandonment of the tram network the Transport Department found itself cutting services because of financial problems. The chief problem was that too much "dead" mileage was being run and some services were not carrying sufficient passengers. The summer of 1952 saw the long-awaited high capacity Standee buses being delivered. The Standees were used on services 5A, 8 and 16, and these routes’serviced the Woolston and Bitterne areas of the city. With the Shirley Depot becoming fully capable of dealing with most routine maintenance and some body work, Portswood nevertheless remained the most important depot of the two as it had a body shop, paint shop and also had equipment for all major mechanical repairs. Buses that were based at Shirley carried "S" on the nearside upper deck front panel.

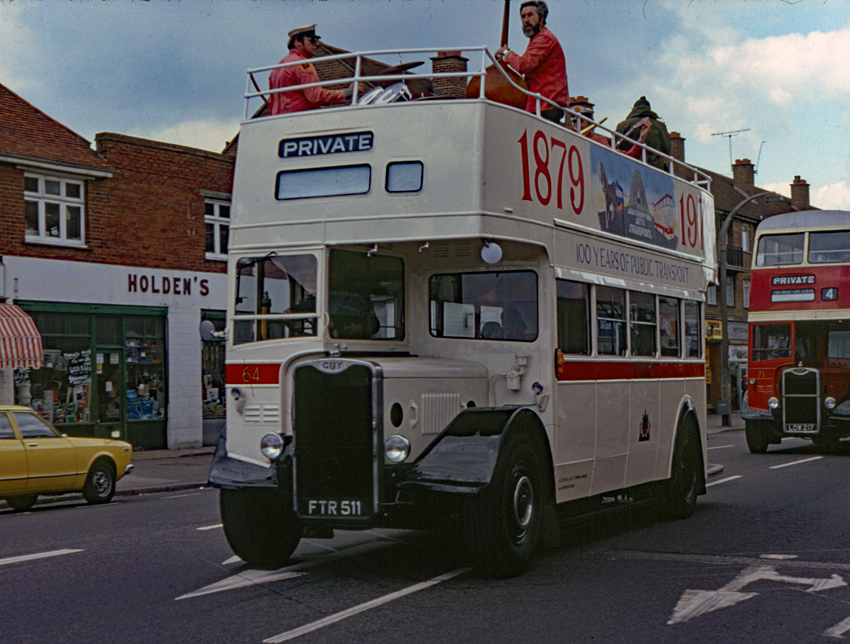
Guy Arab III open top bus in the 1979 Centenary Cavalcade

Service changes were carried out throughout the 1950s to respond to increasing demand. One of the first joint services to operate with joint Hants & Dorset Motor Services was the 54 to West End, which came about in 1953 with the expansion of housing estates. For example, Townhill Park while most was in the 'town' boundary, some it was in Hampshire and so came under the territorial Tilling operator. The summer of 1955 saw an interesting development, which was that two post-war buses were converted to open-top and repainted in a cream and red-lining livery. These were used on a Town Tour, which started on Sunday 8 May 1955. In July 1957 another two services were jointly operated by both the Corporation and Hants & Dorset; the first being from the Town Centre to Millbrook, which was the first to be introduced, and the second being an express coach service from Civic Centre to Southampton Airport, but this was subsequently withdrawn after 6 months due to poor passenger numbers. New large estates were being built across the City and all of them required public transport. A number of services could be diverted or extended to service the new estates. The only estate that needed a new service to be introduced was Thornhill. This requirement saw the birth of the 18 service, which was introduced on 15 December 1957, and ran from Central Station to Thornhill via the Civic Centre and Bitterne.

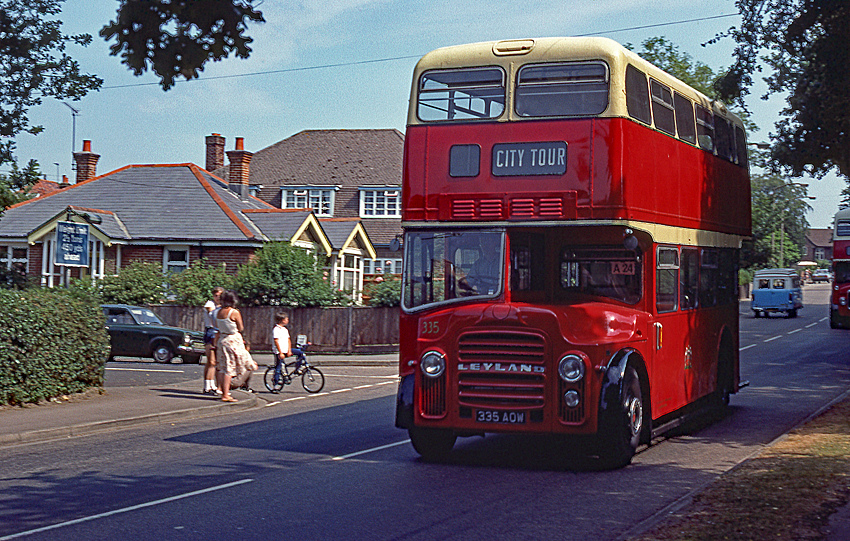
335 Leyland Titan PD2/27 (335 AOW) in Bitterne in 1984

A scheme proposed in 1955 for developing Pound Tree Road in the City Centre as a bus centre. The plans included new shelters and bus stands but it wasn't until the spring of 1959 that services started using the Centre. Since the war the Transport Department Office had been housed in temporary accommodation due to the Above Bar offices being destroyed during the Blitz. Plans for a new headquarters were on the cards for many years but it was not until 12 December 1960 that new headquarters were opened at 224 – 226 Portswood Road, containing facilities for the management of the Transport Department as well as a canteen.

In the earlier 1960s a major programme of fleet replacements was undertaken with the Department testing a number of buses to replace the Guy Arabs that were dating back to 1946. The bus chose to replace the Guy Arabs were Leyland PD2/27s. The first batch to arrive in Southampton was numbered 301–312 and were 27 feet long and 8 feet wide. In 1963 more Guy Arabs were withdrawn as more new buses were arriving this time in the form of AEC Regent Vs.

== 1960 – 1979 ==
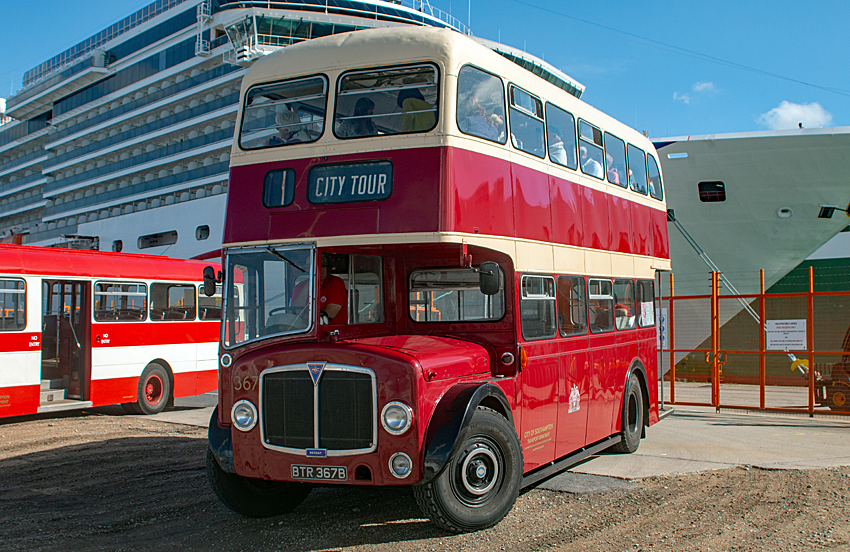
SCT AEC Regent V with East Lancs body

An important event in Southampton happened in 1964 with the elevation of Southampton to City status, therefore changing the previous 'Southampton Corporation Transport' title to 'Southampton City Transport', with the formal date of change being 11 February 1964. The two original open top buses were now due for retirement and were replaced with two converted Guy Arab vehicles from the 1949 batch. Also the Transport Committee decided that all new buses would be A.E.C. chassis fitted with East Lancashire bodies. In 1966, bigger buses that could provide higher passenger capacities were needed and a prototype entered service in early 1966; this being a 30 feet long double-deck bus. The prototype proved to be a success and so was followed by a further seven buses and another 20 in 1967. These would be the last rear entrance double deckers to be bought by Southampton. Later in 1967 another prototype was introduced; this being an A.E.C. Swift, which was a high capacity single decker and was trailed on Woolston routes as a replacement to the Standees, which were due for retirement. The chassis were made by A.E.C. and were 36 feet long. It also had a local body, a Pacemaster built by Strachans of Hamble. Five similar buses were delivered in 1968. All of these buses were one-man operation.

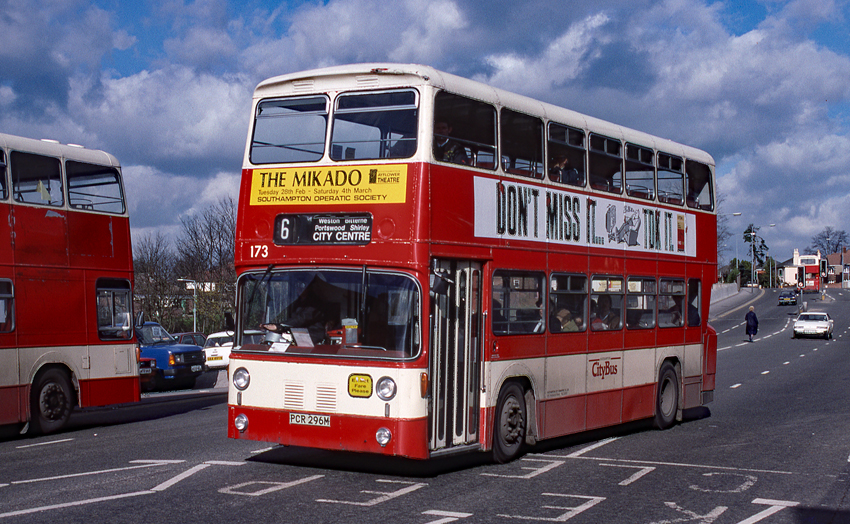
173 Leyland Atlantean (PCR 269M) at Bitterne in 1989

Leyland Atlantean were chosen to be brought into the fleet as they could convert the fleet into single-man operation. The first delivery of Atlanteans that took place in the autumn of 1968 being for staff familiarisation. From 1968 till the end of 1975 more than a hundred were delivered. The first route to be converted to one-man operation was the 18 and 18A from Central Station to Thornhill, and two further routes were converted on 12 January 1969. As more and more Atlanteans joined the fleet there started to be problems at Portswood Depot. So in 1972 work started on stage one of Portswood's redevelopment. This contained a new garage, which included maintenance pits, workshops, and a service block. The new Portswood depot was finished in 1973. In March 1974, work started on the Itchen Bridge and was completed in 1977 and soon after it opened most services were changed to incorporate the new bridge. The Woolston bus station also closed soon after the opening of the bridge.

1979 marked the centenary of Southampton transport and was celebrated by a Grand Cavalcade of buses on Sunday 6 May. The cavalcade started at West Quay and toured round the suburbs ending up on the common. The day culminating in a fireworks display in the evening. The following day judging of entries in the various classes took place. Ninety-three buses took part, both service buses and preserved vehicles, drawn from all over the country. The number included three buses from France, one from Caen and two from Le Havre.

== CityBus ==
In 1986, as a result of deregulation an 'arms-length' limited company was formed in the name of Southampton Citybus and the coat of arms of the City of Southampton was removed, and replaced with the new branding. Southampton Citybus operated a fleet of around 150 vehicles, and a small coaching division named Red Ensign. Following the Transport Act 1985 and the deregulation of the bus market, it faced aggressive competition from the Isle of Wight-based bus company Southern Vectis, which started Solent Blue Line in 1987 as a bid to expand onto the mainland, competing on some of the same major routes as Citybus.

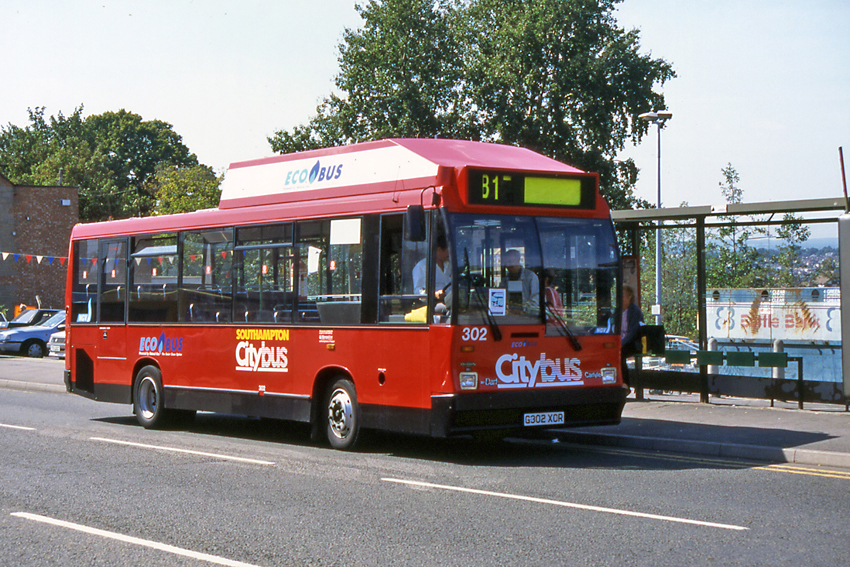
302 Dennis Dart 9SDL Carlyle prototype “Ecobus” (G302 XCR), Bitterne 1995

Southampton City Council owned Southampton Citybus until 21 December 1993 when it was then bought by its employees for around £3 million. Following this Southampton Citybus introduced sixteen natural gas-powered buses into regular service, which at the time was the largest such fleet in the UK. Over the years much of the fleet of 160 buses was replaced. Southampton Citybus was owned by its employees until 1997 when it was purchased by FirstGroup. At first for a brief period they kept the name but soon changed it to First Southampton. Today it is now a part of First Hampshire & Dorset. On 29 November 2022, First Hampshire & Dorset announced it was to cease its operations in Southampton on 19 February 2023.

== Preservation ==
A number of ex-Southampton Corporation Transport buses still survive to the present day. Most are associated with the Southampton & District Transport Heritage Trust who look after Guys 'Arabs' and Standee, A.E.C. Regent and Swift, Seddon RU and Leyland Atlantean and National.

The Southampton & District Transport Heritage Trust (S&DTHT) was formed in the summer of 2000 and drew members from groups including the now defunct Southampton City Transport enthusiasts 7164 Group and the Solent Transport Trust.
