= Southampton Corporation Tramways =

Tramway operator in Hampshire, England

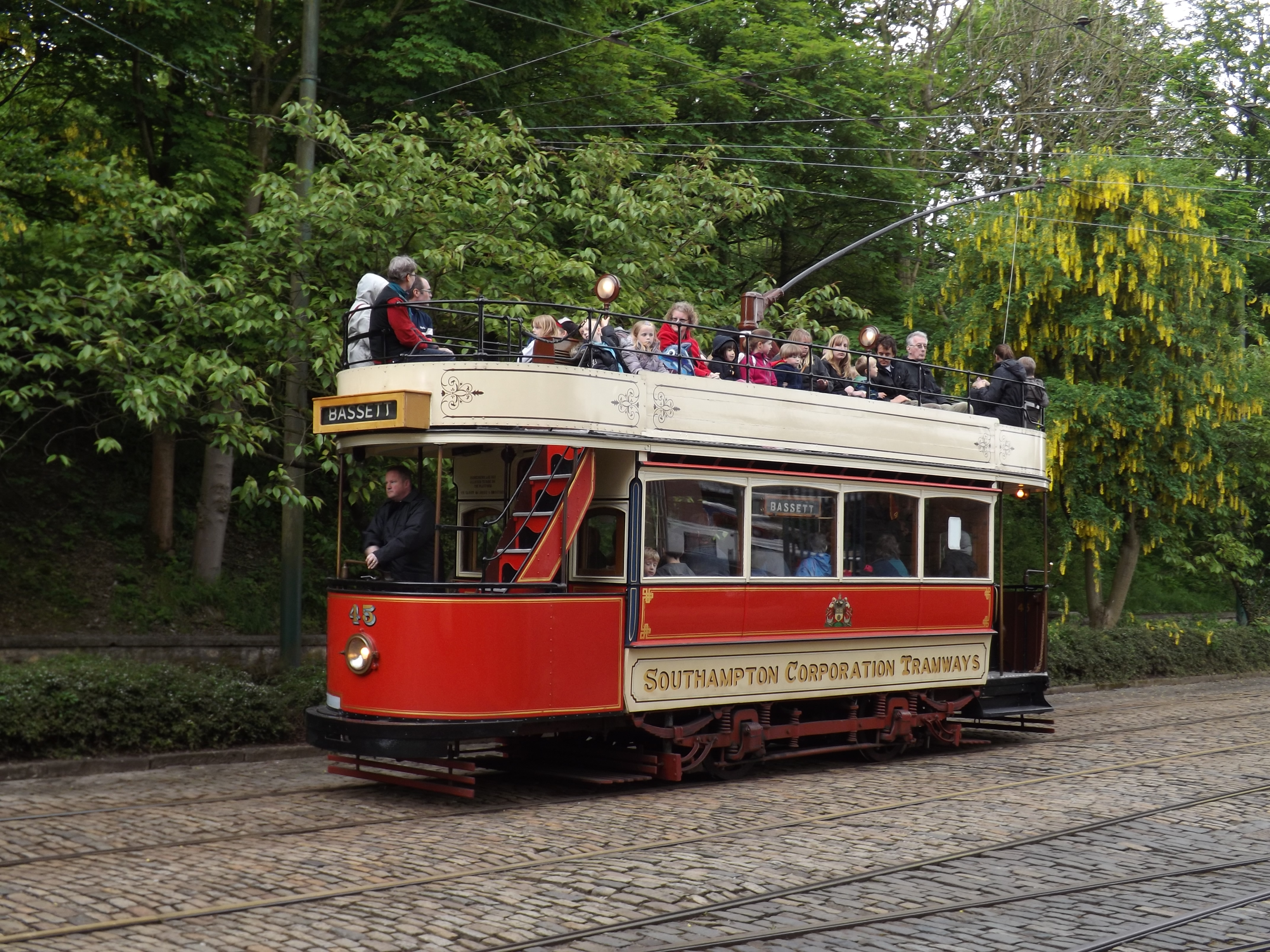
- Southampton Tram 45 at the National Tramway Museum

Operation
- Locale: Southampton
- Open: 1 July 1898
- Close: 31 December 1949
- Status: Closed

Infrastructure
- Track gauge: 1,435 mm (4 ft 8 1/2 in)
- Propulsion system: Electric

Statistics
- Route length: 13.7 miles (22.0 km)
Overview
Southampton Corporation Tramways – Grey=depots, blue=principal stops

Southampton Corporation Tramways were in operation from 1879 to 1949. They were initially horse-drawn, but latterly powered by electricity.

== Background ==
Southampton was a growing town in the nineteenth century. With the coming of the railway in 1839 and the development of the docks, Southampton grew from a population of 27,000 in 1841 to 42,000 in 1861. The first horse-drawn omnibus service in the town started about the time the railway arrived, and by 1843 one Thomas Matcham was running a regular service from the station to Millbrook, Eling, Bitterne, Shirley, Portswood, Totton and Romsey.

By 1872, tramways were becoming fashionable and the British and Foreign Tramway Company approached Southampton Corporation with a view to setting up a tramway in the town. Various objection were raised to this scheme, and the corporation refused to allow tram lines to be laid in the High Street and Above Bar. The company lost interest in the scheme.

By 1876, the corporation realised that Southampton was falling behind other places in regards to the provision of public transport. The Southampton Tramways Company was formed to build a new tramway system. Construction began in the summer of 1878.

== Southampton Tramways Company ==
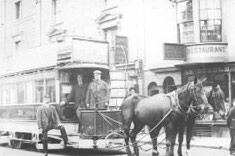

Southampton Tramways Company services began on 5 May 1879, with takings of £26 on that day. There was opposition to the running of trams on Sundays, and a petition of 3,500 signatures was raised against this practice. The manager of the company replied that patronage of the trams on Sundays showed that there was a demand for the service, and that as long as they showed a profit, the trams would continue to run. The first route opened was Stag Gates – Holy Rood, with approval to operate Alma Road – Canute Road – Oxford Street – High Street – Floating Dock and Stag Gates – Lodge Road – Portswood being received on 6 May 1879. Tramway Junction – Commercial Road – Shirley opened on 9 June 1879.

The company was soon in trouble, with one manager having absconded to America in 1881, and another dismissed in 1882 over irregularities in the accounts. By 1887, the company was on a sound financial footing, and paying dividends of 8% per annum to its shareholders. From 22 October 1889, the Portswood route operated via Spear Road and Avenue Road. In 1896, fares were reduced from 3^{d} to 2^{d} for the through routes, and frequency doubled to 5-minute intervals from Stag Gates to Holy Rood. Four new trams and forty more horses were required to operate this service.

The Southampton Tramway Company was compulsorily purchased by Southampton Corporation on 30 June 1898, at a price of £51,000.

=== Trams ===
- Fifteen double deck cars, built 1879. Upper decks later removed to reduce weight.
- Four cars built in 1881 by Starbuck Car and Wagon Company, Birkenhead. Paid for in instalments.
- Four new cars by Brush, Loughborough, supplied in 1896. After electrification they were used as trailers, and two of them were later converted into single deck trams, numbered 50 and 51.

== Southampton Corporation Tramways ==
In 1896, Southampton Corporation had bought out the Southampton Electric Light and Power Company. The compulsory purchase of the Southampton Tramway Company in 1898 paved the way for the provision of electric trams in the town. In 1899, a committee viewed tram systems in Bradford, Dover, Glasgow, Liverpool and London. It was decided to model the system on that of Liverpool. The first electric tramway route, Junction – Shirley, opened on 22 January 1900, and Stag Gates – Prospect Place – Holy Rood, 29 May 1900. The system was gradually extended. Holy Rood – Bridge Street – Docks, 12 September 1900. Stag Gates – Portswood, 4 October 1900. Ordnance Office – Bellevue Terrance – St. Mary's – Docks, 3 August 1901. Marsh Lane – Central Bridge – Floating Bridge Road, 17 October 1901. Docks – Central Bridge – Floating Bridge Road, on or about 10 January 1902. Portswood Bitterne Park Triangle, 30 August 1902. Stag Gates – Common (Highfield Road),19 May 1903. Onslow Road – Bevois Hill – Lodge Road, 20 April 1903. Portswood – Hampton Park, 25 July 1903. This completed the initial extent of the electrified system.

Further extensions before the war were Clock Tower – Northam Bridge, 17 December 1910. Holy Rood – High Street – Royal Pier, in June 1911 and Common (Highfield Road) – Common (Old Race Course) after July 1911. This latter destination was later known as "Rest Camp". After the war, further extension opened. Common (Rest Camp) – Bassett Crossroads, 25 March 1921. Roberts Road – Millbrook, 5 January 1922. Hampton Park – Swaythling, 23 February 1922. Bitterne Park Triangle – Bullar Road – Bitterne Station, 26 July 1923. Bassett Crossroads – Burgess Road – Swaythling, 10 July 1930. This latter bringing the system to its fullest extent. The only other new lines opened after this were the lines that bypassed Bargate. The east side opened on 24 April 1932 and the west side on 5 June 1938. Prewar closures were Roberts Road – Millbrook (except workmen's services), 2 October 1935 (reinstated during the war) and Clock Tower – Northam Bridge, 4 June 1926.

=== Trams ===
Bought

- The first trams, 1-20, were built by G F Milnes & Co., Birkenhead. The open upper deck had back-to-back "knifeboard" seats, necessary to fit under Bargate arch. No.2 converted into toast-rack in 1916, sold to Portsmouth in 1919, becoming their No.104.
- A further nine trams, 21-29, also built by Milnes, in 1901.
- Eight three window, sixteen foot saloon open top trams, 30-37, built by Milnes in 1901/2.
- Twelve trams, 38-49, built in 1903 by Hurst, Nelson & Co. Originally built with three windows each side on the lower deck, all rebuilt within four years to have four windows each side as the original design did not offer enough support for the upper deck.
- Two bogie trams ordered in 1910, later cancelled.
- Six ex-LCC cars with enclosed upper decks, numbered 75-80.
- Sixteen trams bought in 1918.

Built

- 50-51, Demicars built from the saloons of former horse cars in 1906.
- 52 built at Portswood in 1908, open upper deck.
- 81 built at Portswood in 1919, first with closed upper deck and longest tram in service.
- Sixty three other trams built at Portswood 1908–31
- Twelve trams built at Portswood in 1931, known as the "Pullmans".

=== Round topped "Bargate" trams ===
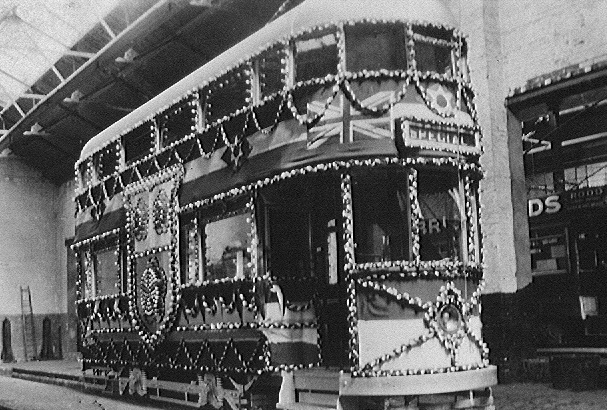
Round topped "Bargate" tram, decorated for Royal visit, 1930

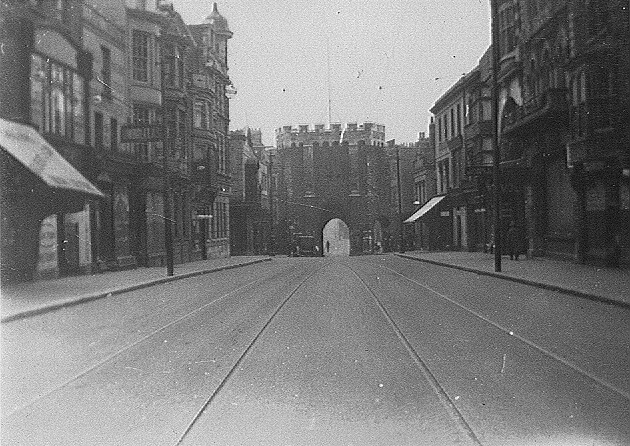
Above Bar 1926, showing tramlines and the problem posed by the Bargate

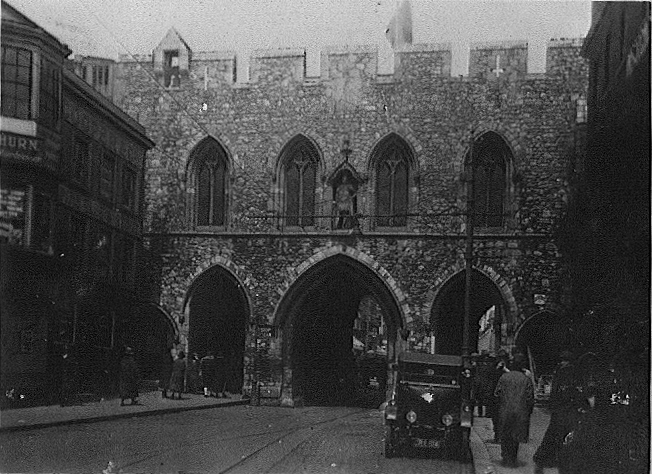
High Street Southampton, circa 1930, showing tramlines through the centre arch of the Bargate.

Prior to 1932, the only road route between Southampton High Street and Above Bar was through the arch in the centre of the Bargate. In 1923 a new design of enclosed double deck tram was introduced by P. J. Baker, General Manager of the tramways, with a rounded top that would fit through the arch. These trams had smaller wheels to help reduce the overall height and were driven by high speed motors producing more torque. Despite the clever design, the roadway through the arch in the Bargate still had to be lowered and some secretive fine-tuning of the profile of the arch masonry was also required at the last minute. Trams started to pass around the East of the Bargate on 24 April 1932. The last tram to pass through the central archway did so on 4 June 1938, by which time part of Southampton ancient walls had been demolished so that the Bargate was passable on both sides.

=== Locomotive ===
In 1903 Southampton Corporation Tramways agreed to construct an 0-4-0 locomotive for Southampton Power Station. The locomotive cost £146 and began work in 1904 and was scrapped in 1953.

=== Lucy Boxes ===
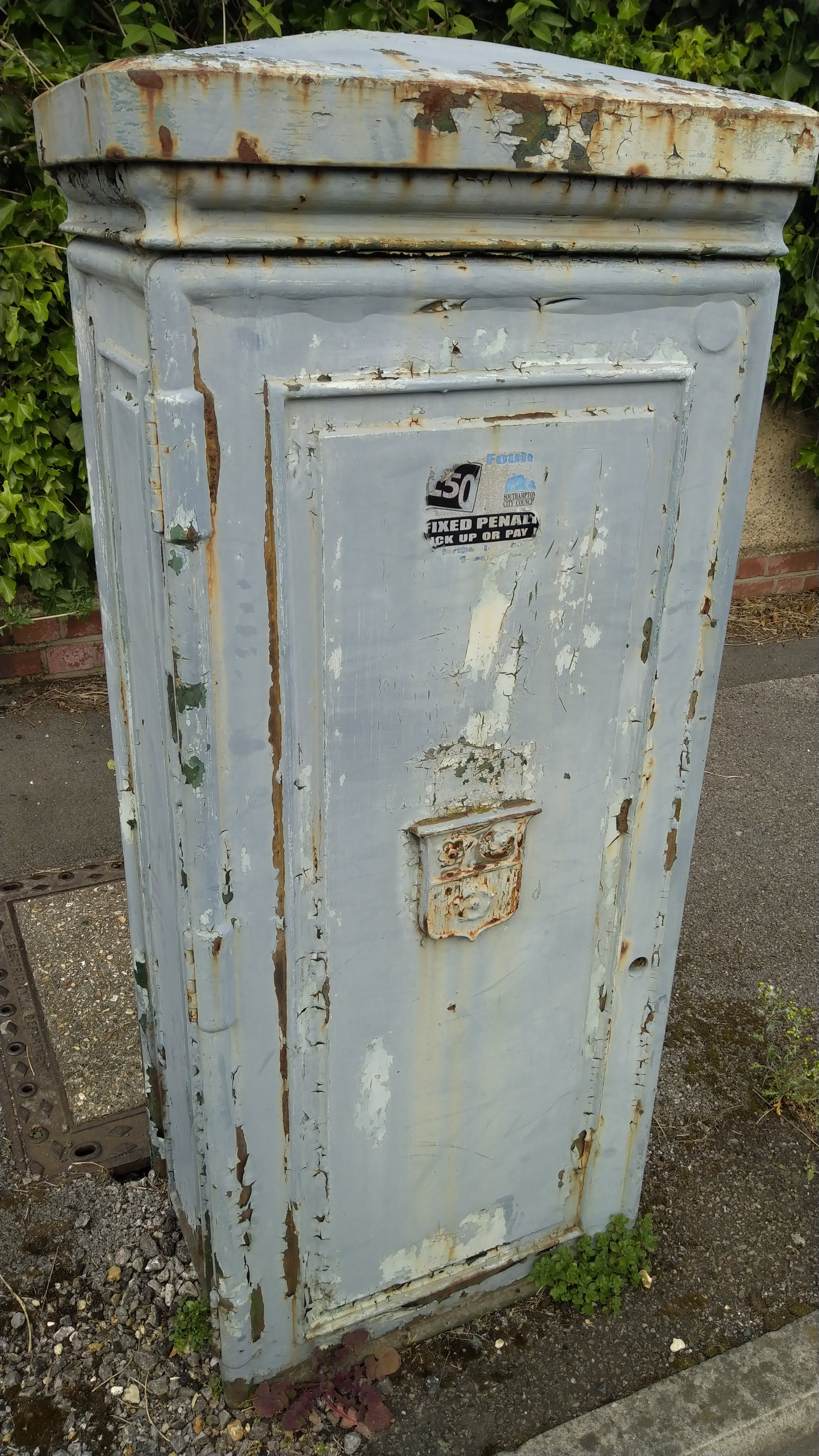
A Lucy Box

Throughout Southampton there are a number of what are locally called Lucy Boxes, so called because they were made by W. Lucy & Co. for power distribution. They still remain along the routes even though the tram lines have been removed. Examples remain in other cities, including Wolverhampton.

== World War One ==
Southampton Tramways were affected by staffing issues during World War I, leading to the introduction of female "conductorettes". Tram No.2, which had been converted to a toastrack in 1916, had a central gangway cut through for the benefit of the ladies. In the early years of the war, a tram went round Southampton for two hours twice a week, with a military band playing on the top deck, in an effort to boost recruitment.

== World War two ==
World War II affected Southampton much more than World War One. Again women were employed, but this time they were needed to drive the trams as well as collect fares. Car no.31 was destroyed by an incendiary bomb on 30 November 1940, the only loss of the war. To save the fleet of trams from the intensive bombing of Southampton during World War II, they were painted grey, regular services ceased at 7pm and they were parked up overnight in Cemetery Road on Southampton Common.

In November 1942, a tram was accidentally set in motion whilst parked up overnight, taking two others with it. The unmanned convoy of trams was stopped by a lorry before anybody was hurt. That incident caused some consternation locally, as saboteurs were thought to be responsible. It later emerged that the incident was due to a young boy playing on the trams.

== Closure ==
The trams in Southampton had consistently made good profits for Southampton Corporation, but the profits went into the rate relief fund instead of being re-invested into the tram system. Consequently, by the end of the Second World War, the whole system needed modernisation – the trams, the power supply and the track. It was decided that buses were a better alternative. The first line to close was Bitterne Park – St. Mary's – Docks, which closed on 15 May 1948. Swaythling – Portswood – Lodge Road – Stag Gates closed on 30 October 1948. Swaythling – Burgess Road – Bassett Crossroads – Avenue Junction closed on 5 March 1949. Floating Bridge – Shirley, Holy Rood – High Street – Royal Pier and Roberts Road – Millbrook all closed on 31 December 1949. The last movement of a tram in Southampton was on 4 February 1950 when cars No.21 and No.101 were moved from Shirley depot to Portswood depot under their own power. After closure, some dome-topped trams were sold to Leeds, but the majority were sent to A. F. Harris's scrapyard at Bevois Valley for scrapping. A few were sold on from there to be used as sheds or summer houses, which enabled the preservation of three vehicles.

== Preservation ==
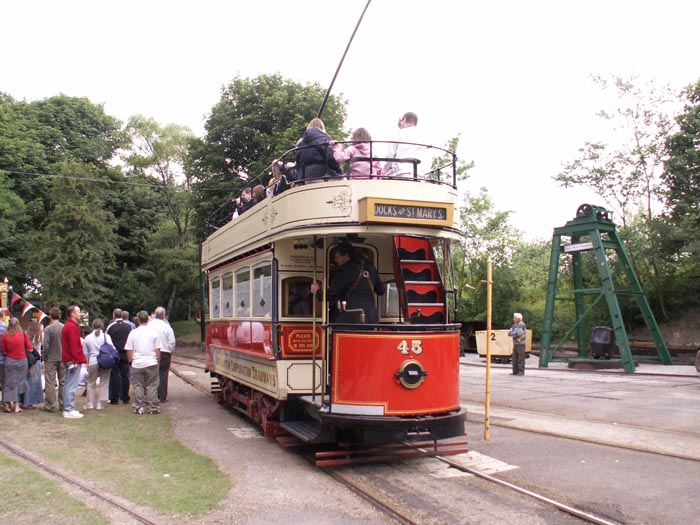
No.45 at Crich

Four Southampton trams have survived.

- 11 was discovered in 1979, having been used as a summer house near Winchester. This tram is under restoration by the Southampton Tram Project and as of March 2020 it is 95% complete.
- 38 appeared with 11 at the 2013 Southampton Maritime Festival. The only part left of the vehicle is the lower salon, which is due to be restored.
- 45 was sold for £10 to the Light Railway Transport League for preservation in 1949. It was the very first tram to be preserved by a body other than an operator. Now preserved at the National Tramway Museum, Crich.
- 57 was discovered in woods at Romsey in 1972. It was rescued in 1975. This tram is in store.
