= Southampton Tramways Company =

Tramway company of the 19th century in Southampton, UK

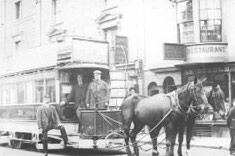
- Horse Tram in Oxford St., Southampton, c.1895.

Operation
- Locale: Southampton
- Open: 5 May 1879
- Close: 1 July 1898
- Status: Closed

Infrastructure
- Track gauge: 1,435 mm (4 ft 8 1/2 in)
- Propulsion system: Horse
- Depot: Highfield

Southampton Tramways Company operated a tramway service in Southampton between 1879 and 1898.

== History ==
Services began on 5 May 1879, with takings of £26 (equivalent to £2,800 in 2025) on that day. There was opposition to the running of trams on Sundays, and a petition of 3,500 signatures was raised against this practice. The manager of the company replied that patronage of the trams on Sundays showed that there was a demand for the service, and that as long as they showed a profit, the trams would continue to run.

The first route opened was Stag Gates – Holy Rood, with approval to operate Alma Road – Canute Road – Oxford Street – High Street – Floating Dock and Stag Gates – Lodge Road – Portswood being received on 6 May 1879. Tramway Junction – Commercial Road – Shirley opened on 9 June 1879.

The company was soon in trouble, with one manager having absconded to America in 1881, and another dismissed in 1882 over irregularities in the accounts. By 1887, the company was on a sound financial footing, and paying dividends of 8% per annum to its shareholders.

The manager until he died aged 47 in 1887 was James Sutton. The offices were in Upper Prospect Place and Union Road, Shirley.

From 22 October 1889, the Portswood route operated via Spear Road and Avenue Road.

In 1896, fares were reduced from 3d to 2d for the through routes, and frequency doubled to 5 minute intervals from Stag Gates to Holy Rood. Four new trams and forty more horses were required to operate this service.

== Tram fleet ==
- Fifteen double deck cars, built 1879. Upper decks later removed to reduce weight.
- Four cars built in 1881 by Starbuck Car and Wagon Company, Birkenhead. Paid for in instalments.
- Four new cars by Brush, Loughborough, supplied in 1896. After electrification they were used as trailers, and two of them were later converted into single deck trams, numbered 50 and 51.

== Closure ==
The Southampton Tramway Company was compulsorily purchased by Southampton Corporation on 30 June 1898, at a price of £51,000 (equivalent to £5,700,000 in 2025), and modernised by Southampton Corporation Tramways.
