= Alternative Chassis Engineering =

UK vehicle manufacturers

- Industry: Automotive
- Founded: 1980s
- Defunct: 1992
- Headquarters: Huddersfield, England
- Products: Bus chassis Fire appliances
- Owner: Steven Ives
- Number of employees: 8

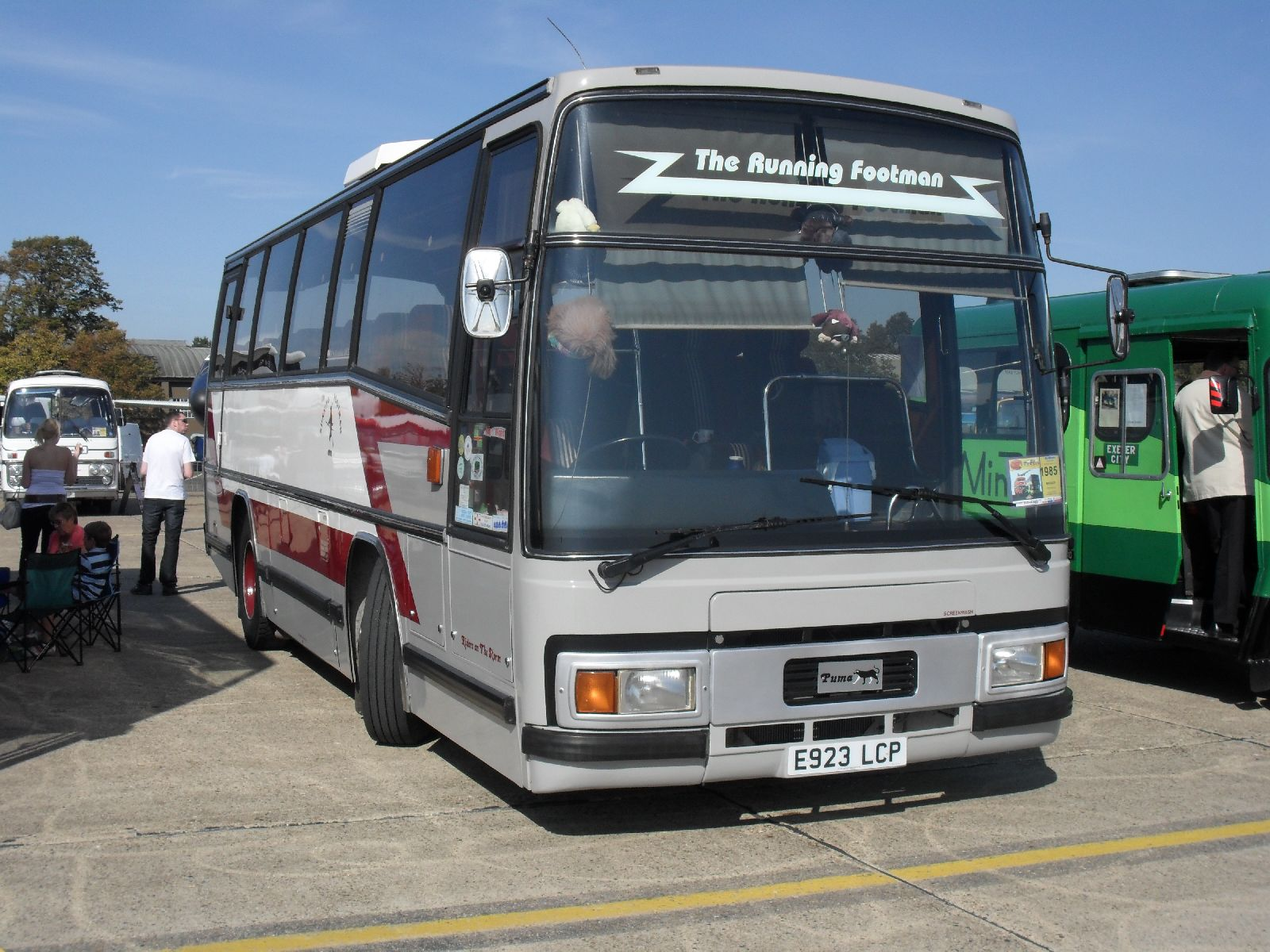
A Plaxton coach on an Alternative Chassis Engineering Puma IV chassis

Alternative Chassis Engineering was an English vehicle manufacturer established. It produced buses, coaches and fire appliances. It ceased production in 1992.
