= First Hampshire & Dorset =

Bus operator in Hampshire and Dorset, England

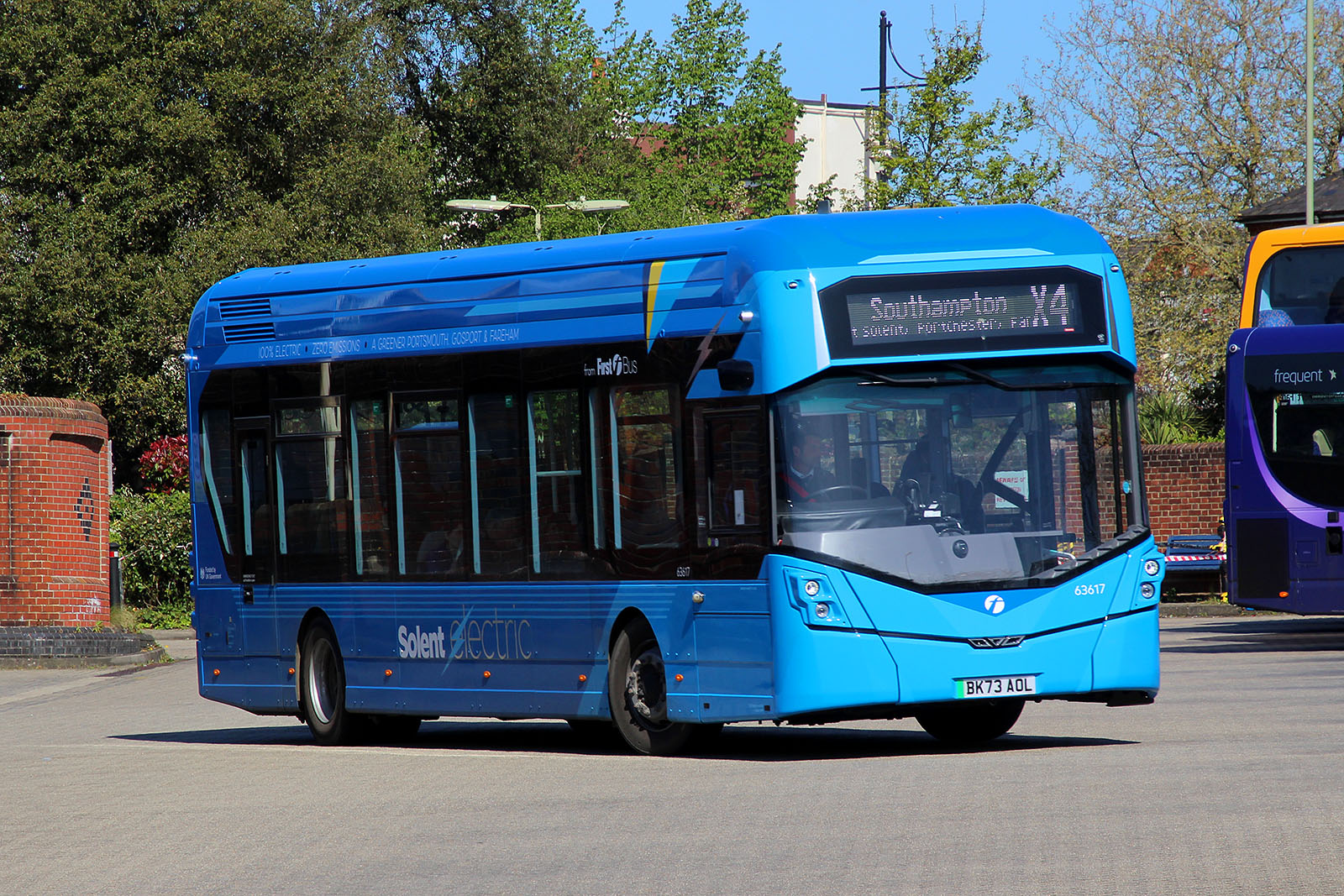
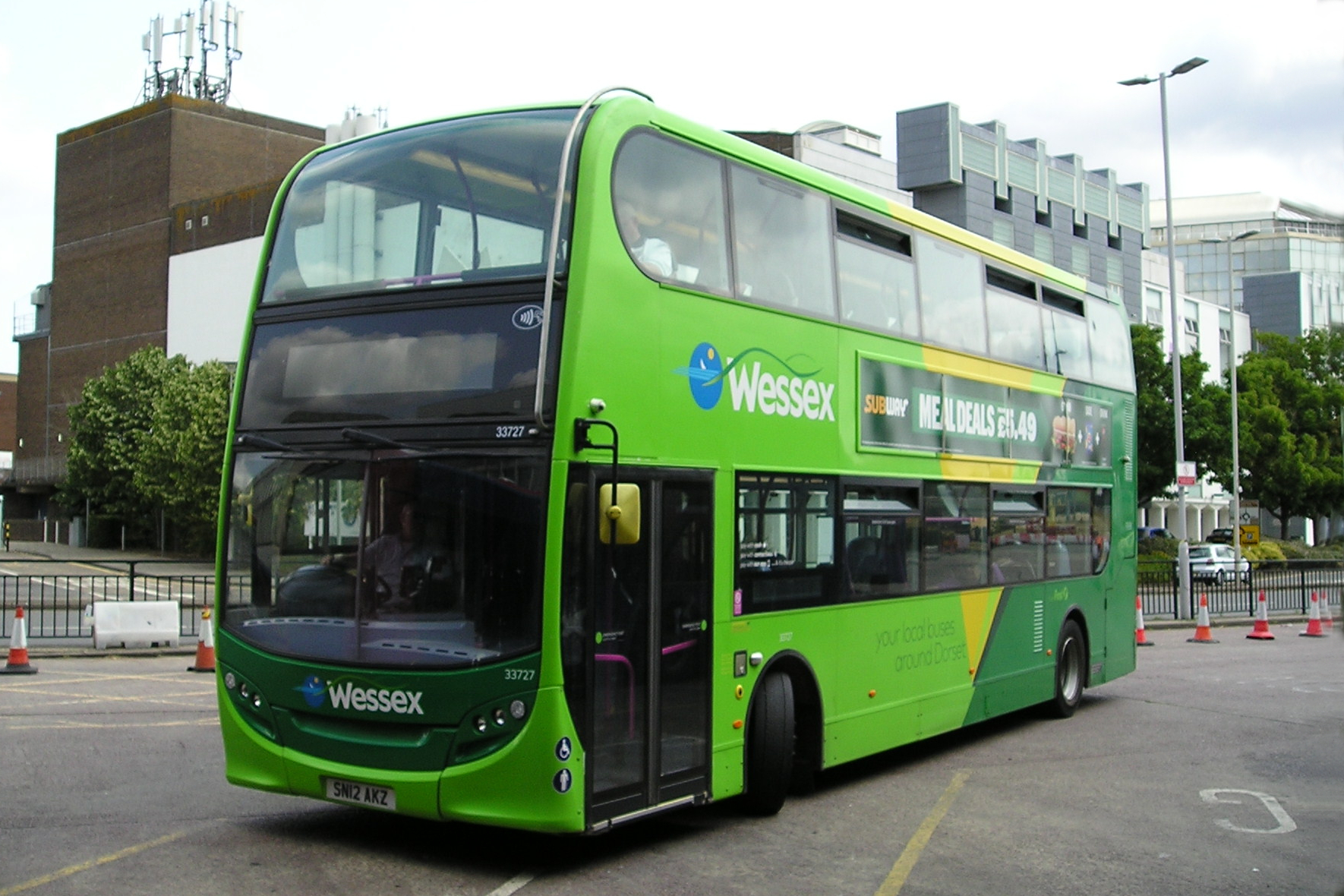
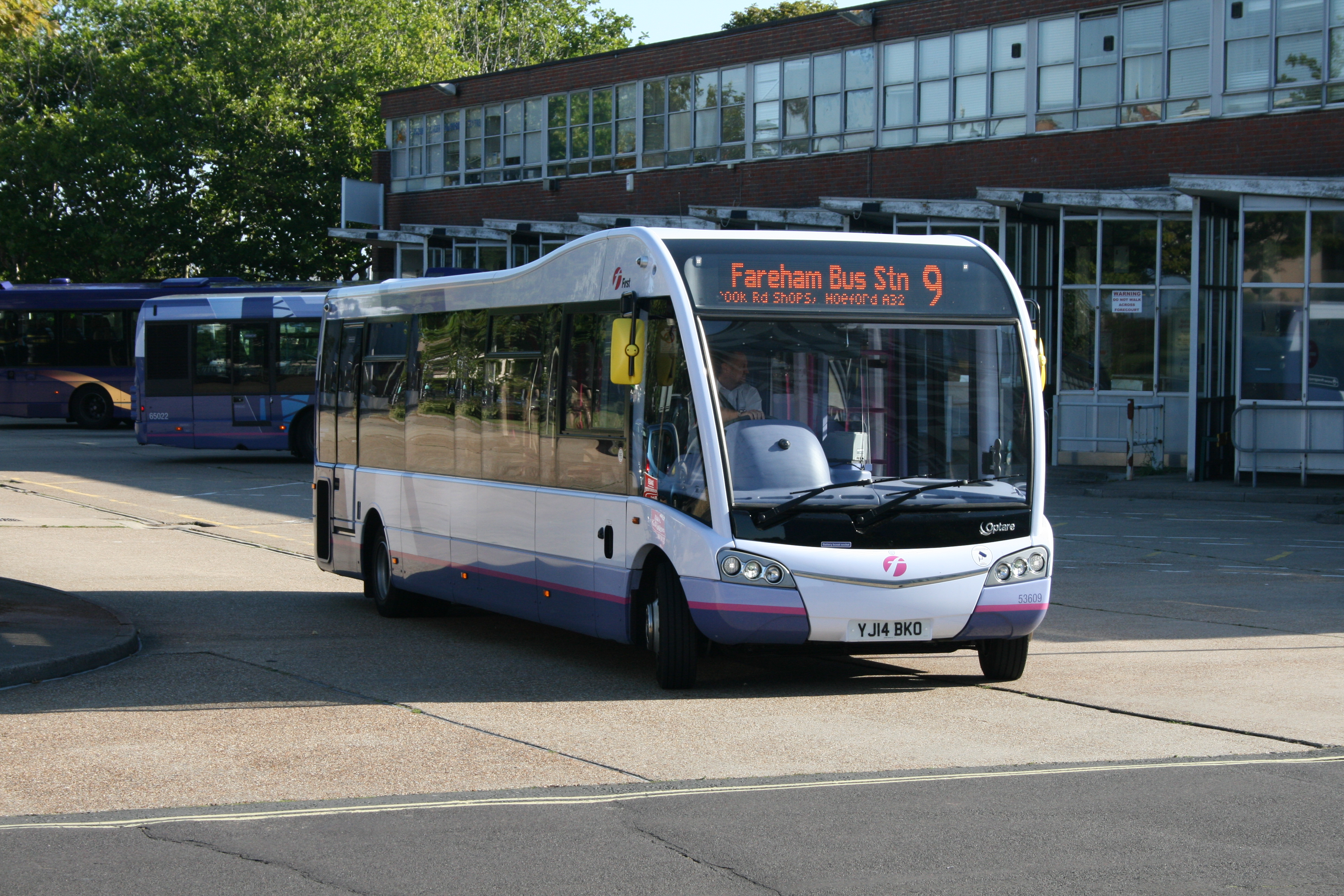
- First row: Solent Electric Wright GB Kite Electroliner, Wessex ADL Enviro400; Second row: First Olympia Optare Solo SR
- Parent: FirstGroup
- Founded: 1997
- Headquarters: Fareham
- Service area: Hampshire; Dorset
- Service type: Bus services
- Destinations: Portsmouth; Fareham; Gosport; Weymouth; Bridport; Southampton
- Website: firstbus.co.uk/portsmouth firstbus.co.uk/wessex

First Hampshire & Dorset is a bus operator providing services in the counties of Hampshire and Dorset. It is a subsidiary of FirstGroup.

== History ==
=== Formation ===
First Hampshire & Dorset was created out of various different smaller companies which were merged once FirstGroup had acquired them.

In October 1995 FirstGroup purchased the bus services in Fareham, Gosport and Portsmouth operated by People's Provincial. In April 1996 FirstGroup purchased services in Portsmouth from Transit Holdings trading as Red Admiral & Blue Admiral, which in turn had taken over the Portsmouth CityBus operations under the title of Southdown Portsmouth. This operation was then put under the control of People's Provincial and the whole renamed to First Provincial.

In 1997 FirstGroup purchased Southampton Citybus and after a brief period of using the Citybus name, the operation was renamed First Southampton. In 1999 First Southampton merged with First Provincial to form First Hampshire, later being renamed First Hampshire & Dorset.

In 1999 FirstGroup purchased Southern National with its Dorset operations merged to form First Hampshire & Dorset in 2003.

=== Since 2010 ===
In October 2010, The headquarters was moved from Portswood where Southampton Citybus was based to a new site in Empress Road by the River Itchen in Southampton, whilst the former depot was closed and sold off to become a Sainsbury's superstore, ending 130 years of its purpose as a depot.

In October 2013, Firstgroup debuted the launch of their "the star" brand for routes 7 and 8, running along the A3 where the old Portsdown and Horndean tram service were. £4.8m was spent on 26 buses branded for these routes. A later fleet of 24 Alexander Dennis Enviro200 MMCs were introduced in January 2020 with WiFi and Euro 6 rated engines.

In January 2014, Firstgroup launched the "city red" brand in Southampton, with £100,000 spent on refurbishing 14 Wright Eclipse Urbans with wood effect floors and leather seating. Later in August 2014, the company invested £2.7m into 18 buses on routes 2 and 11, as well as a further investment of £1.6m for 10 buses on route 7.

In November 2015, FirstGroup invested £2.75m into a fleet of 17 Wright StreetLite MAX buses for routes X4 and X5 as part of the "Solent Rangers" brand for these routes initially connecting Southampton and Fareham to Gosport and Portsmouth.

In July 2022, FirstGroup launched the "Southsea Coaster", an open top bus route which ran between The Hard Bus station and South Parade Pier in Portsmouth. This route ran until September 2022.

In November 2022 FirstGroup announced that its Southampton-based operations would be withdrawn, citing low patronage numbers and sustainability issues. The final day of its operations was on 18 February 2023. The company later purchased the old Daily Mail Group news centre in Portsmouth in March 2023 to construct a new depot which would accommodate 62 new electric buses by April 2024. These buses were purchased from bus manufacturer Wrightbus with assistance from the UK government's ZEBRA scheme, with an initial purchase of 28 buses made in March 2023.

== Divisions ==
First Hampshire and Dorset operate within six different cities within the two counties and are grouped into the following divisions:

=== First Portsmouth, Fareham & Gosport ===
Logo for the Portsmouth, Fareham & Gosport division

First Portsmouth, Fareham & Gosport run multiple different services within Portsea island and the Gosport Peninsula with the majority of the routes run using the Solent Branding. In this division there are 16 routes which are divided into routes in Fareham and Gosport and routes in Portsmouth.

==== The Star ====
Logo for "The Star"

The Star (stylised as the STAR) is one of the brands that First Portsmouth, Fareham & Gosport use which follows along the A3 that replaced the Portsdown and Horndean tram service which had been superseded by motor buses in 1935. The brand itself was started in 2008 with the creation of the A3 corridor. There are two routes under this brand: Route 7 runs along London road (A2407) from Portsmouth university via Cosham and Crookhorn before ending in Wecock Farm whilst route 8 uses the A3 starting its journey at The Hard Interchange via City Centre, Cosham, Purbrook and Horndean and terminating at Clanfield.

==== Eclipse ====
Eclipse is one of the brands that First Portsmouth, Fareham & Gosport use which uses an unguided busway that runs from Redlands Lane to Rowner Road, however the full route runs from Fareham Bus Station to Gosport Ferry in an attempt to reduce congestion on the A32 and improve connectivity between the two towns.

=== First Wessex, Dorset & South Somerset ===
Logo for the Wessex, Dorset and Somerset division

First Wessex, Dorset & Somerset operate services situated near the coastline in Weymouth. This division was created as a result of the purchase and later split of Southern National and the Dorset operations was merged into what would become First Hampshire and Dorset.

The division operates a number of services in and around Weymouth, five are branded under the "Jurassic Coaster" name. Most of the divisions services operate within Weymouth Town Centre, connecting it with Dorchester, Portland, Chickerell, Littlemoor and Preston. The division also operates summer only services to the Waterside and Littlesea Holiday Parks. The only exception is service 6 which operates between Bridport and Yeovil.

Services are operated using a mixture of Wright StreetLite, Alexander Dennis Enviro400 MMC and Alexander Dennis Enviro400 vehicles.

==== Jurassic Coaster ====
Jurassic Coaster is the brand given to several of the routes running along the Jurassic coast.

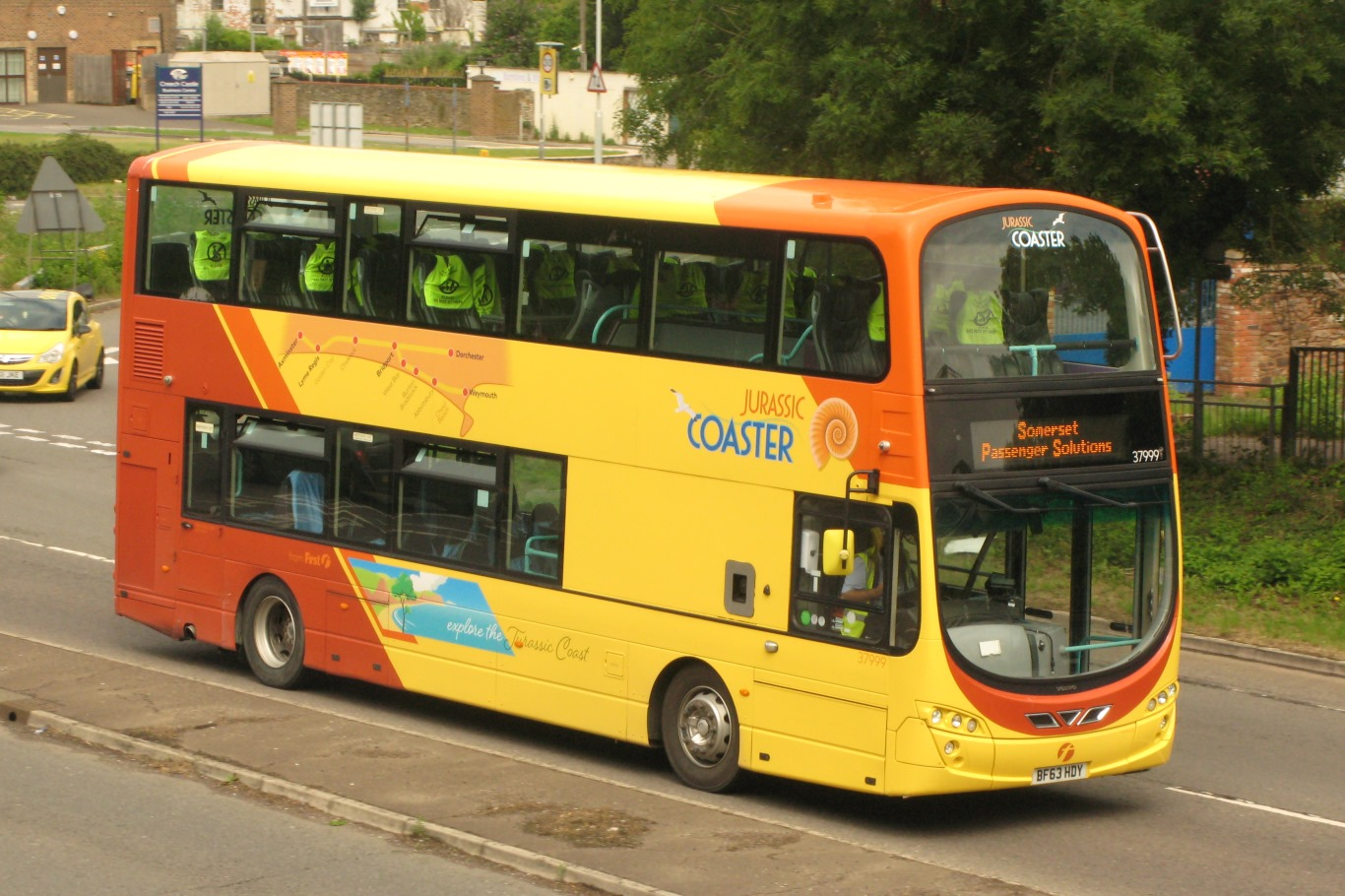
Jurassic Coaster liveried Wright Eclipse Gemini 2 bodied Volvo B9TL

The network is currently formed of five routes, all of which run to a two-hourly frequency:

- Route X50 runs from Weymouth to Swanage via Lulworth Cove, Wareham and Corfe Castle (runs during the summer only using open-top buses)
- Route X51 runs from Weymouth to Axminster via Dorchester, Bridport and Lyme Regis
- Route X52 runs from Weymouth to Bridport via Lulworth Cove, Weymouth and Abbotsbury (runs during the summer only using open-top buses)
- Route X53 runs from Weymouth to Axminster via Abbotsbury, Bridport and Lyme Regis
- Route X54 runs from Weymouth to Wareham via Lulworth Cove & Wool.
- Portland Coaster (former route 501) from Weymouth to Portland Bill via Wyke Regis, Fortuneswell and Southwell (runs during the summer only using open-top buses)

The Jurassic Coaster services are operated using a mixture of Volvo B7TL Alexander Dennis ALX400, Volvo B7TL Wright Eclipse Gemini, Volvo B9TL Wright Eclipse Gemini 2, Alexander Dennis Enviro400 and Alexander Dennis Enviro400 MMC vehicles.

=== Former operations ===
First Southampton

Logo for the former Southampton division

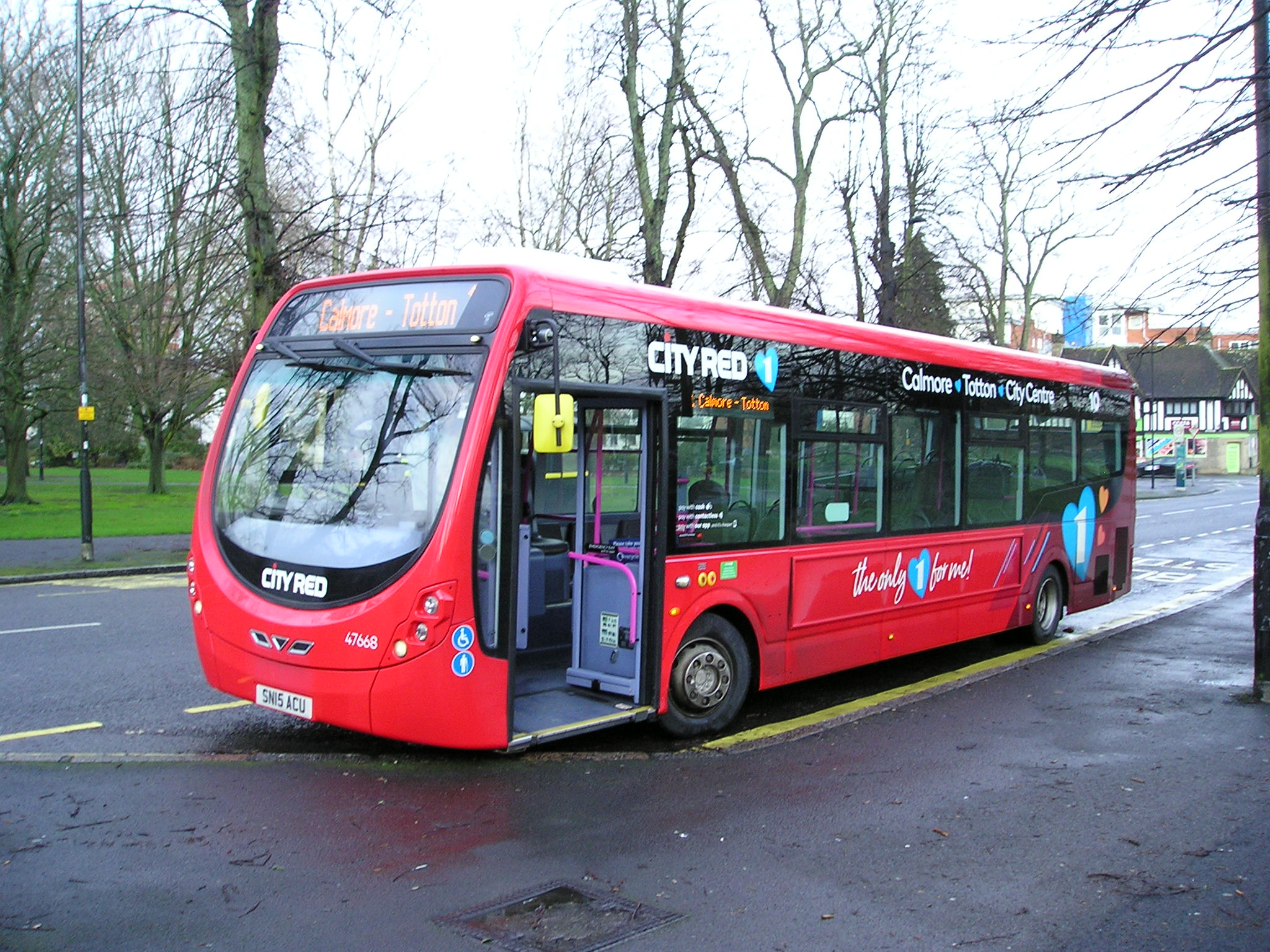
Wright Streetlite in City Red livery branded for the route 1

First Southampton had run their buses using the "city red" branding, which in 2014 started to replace and rebrand routes that were previously under the generic First livery. They had nine routes that cover from Totton and Millbrook to Sholing and West End with all but one route terminating at the city. The city red branding initially consisted of 30 buses, with a fleet of Volvo B7RLE Wright Eclipse Urbans and Wright StreetLites before expanding. The branding itself was reminiscent of the previous Southampton Citybus operator that used to run in the city. The buses that were inherited from Southampton Citybus were either repainted or transferred to other FirstGroup divisions and by the mid-2010s any remaining step entrance buses were sold or scrapped.

For a time, First Southampton had run routes to the University of Southampton as an agreement with them for three years in 1998, under the Unilink brand. These had gas powered Duple Dartlines with the Dennis Dart chassis liveried in a mix of blue and pink colours.

Due to low patronage numbers and sustainability issues, the company announced its intention to close its Southampton division in November 2022. All routes ran under First Southampton were withdrawn on 18 February 2023, with most of its routes taken over by Bluestar.

== Fleet ==
As of February 2023, the fleet consisted of 258 buses. These are allocated to the following divisions:

- The Portsmouth, Fareham & Gosport division has 149 buses spread over its Hilsea and Hoeford depots.
- The Southampton division had 55 buses in its single depot.
- The Wessex, Dorset & Somerset division has 54 buses in its single depot.

=== History ===
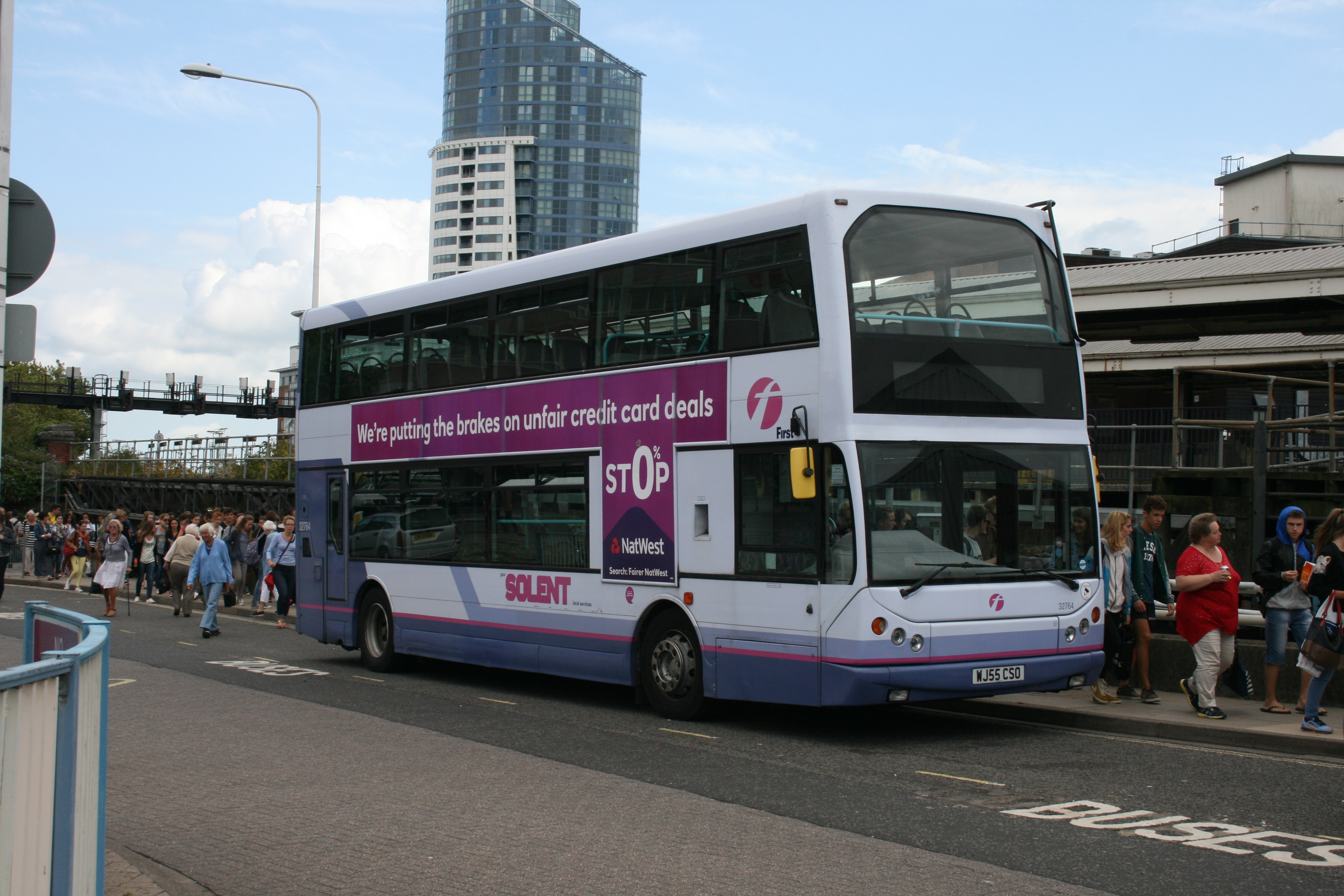
First Olympia liveried East Lancs Myllennium Lolyne at The Hard, Portsmouth

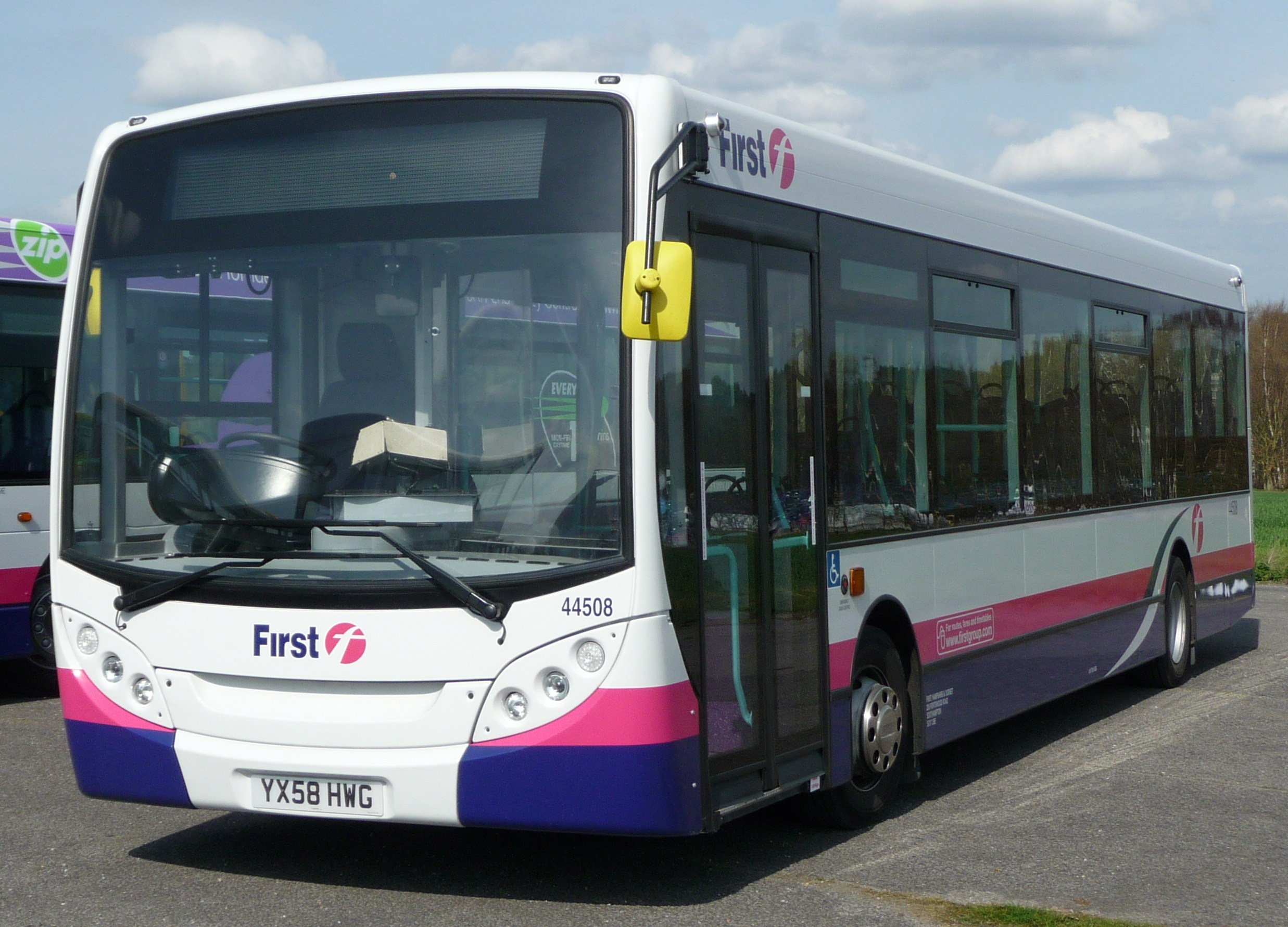
Alexander Dennis Enviro200 Dart in First Barbie livery

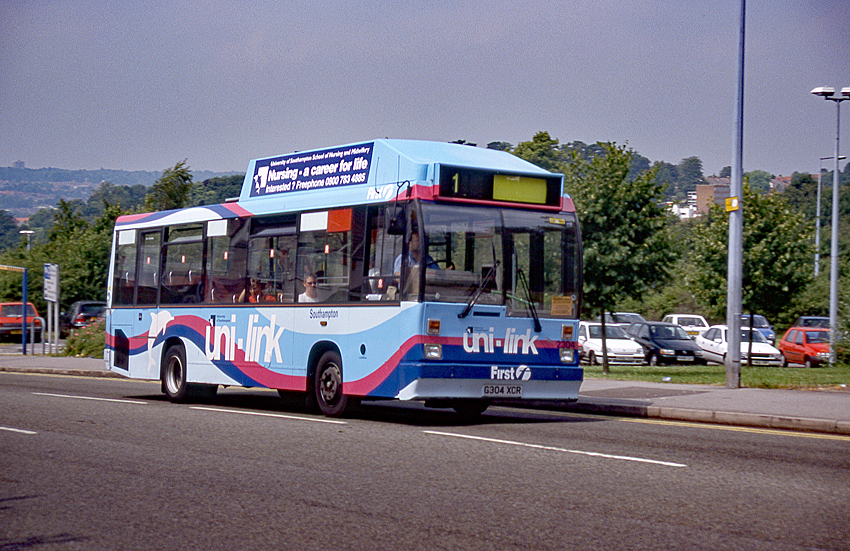
Uni-link Dennis Dart 9SDL Carlyle Dartline

In Weymouth, First operate a number of Wright StreetLite buses on routes 1, 2, 3, 4, 8 and 10 purchased between 2013 and 2014. Several Optare Solos purchased in 2014, working primarily on routes 3, 6 and 8. Wright Eclipse-bodied Volvo B7RLEs which started operation in 2008 which was subsequently replaced by Wright Eclipse Urban 2s in 2017 which were displaced to other FirstGroup divisions. Several Wright Eclipse Gemini bodied Volvo B9TLs operating mostly on route X53 between Poole and Axminster were bought in 2008. Six Scania N94UDs were bought in 2004 & 2005 operating on route X51, which had left the fleet earlier in 2020.

In Portsmouth, First bought several new buses between 2015 and 2020 to replace older buses running on these routes, with Wright StreetLite MAX buses being bought for the "Solent Rangers" routes which link Southampton with Portsmouth and Gosport to replace the Scania N94UB Omnicitys that covered the route in late 2015. ADL Enviro200 MMCs were bought for the Eclipse busway in 2016 to replace the Wright Eclipse 2s which were displaced and sent to Manchester. Enviro200 MMCs were purchased again in 2020 with start-stop technology for "The Star" routes to replace the older Wright StreetLite MAXs which had been running on the route before. These buses were transferred over to the Southampton division to replace the Wright Eclipse buses that were branded for route 3.

In Southampton, First inherited a large number of Leyland Atlanteans from Southampton Citybus along with Leyland Lynxs, Leyland Olympians and gas powered Dennis Darts. All of these have now been withdrawn from the Southampton fleet. An unusual vehicle inherited from the Provincial fleet was the first ACE Cougar, one of just two built, which has also been withdrawn.

First introduced a number of bus types that are also no longer in service in Southampton; these include Volvo B7LA / Wright Eclipse Fusion bendy buses introduced in 2000 but transferred to First Glasgow in 2003 after they proved unsuitable for a number of Southampton roads, former First Capital Dennis Arrows proved unpopular in Southampton and moved onto First Greater Manchester in 2006. First had operated Optare Solos on the free City-link service between Southampton Central station, West Quay Shopping Centre and Town Quay, these left the Southampton fleet when First lost the City-link contract to Unilink, which subsequently became franchised to Bluestar in 2008. The fleet that remained in Southampton were all Wright StreetLite buses, with the last of the Wright Eclipse Urban-bodied Volvo B7RLEs transferring to First Wessex in August 2020 though in April 2021, First had introduced Wright StreetDecks into the fleet to improve service capacity.

In April 2024, First began the introduction of 62 Electric buses in the Portsmouth, Fareham and Gosport area. They are operated from their Hoeford Depot and are a result of a partnership with Portsmouth City Council and Hampshire County Council.

== See also ==
- List of bus companies in the United Kingdom
