= Go South Coast =

Bus operator in southern England

- Parent: Go-Ahead Group
- Founded: 2005; 21 years ago
- Headquarters: Poole
- Service area: Dorset; Hampshire; Isle of Wight; Wiltshire; Somerset
- Service type: Bus & coach services
- Depots: 13
- Fleet: 850
- Annual ridership: 46 million (June 2014)
- Chief executive: Ed Wills
- Website: gosouthcoast.co.uk

Go South Coast is a bus operator on the south coast of England. It is a subsidiary of the Go-Ahead Group. All services under the company come under its operating certificate, although the buses run under a multitude of brands.

== History ==
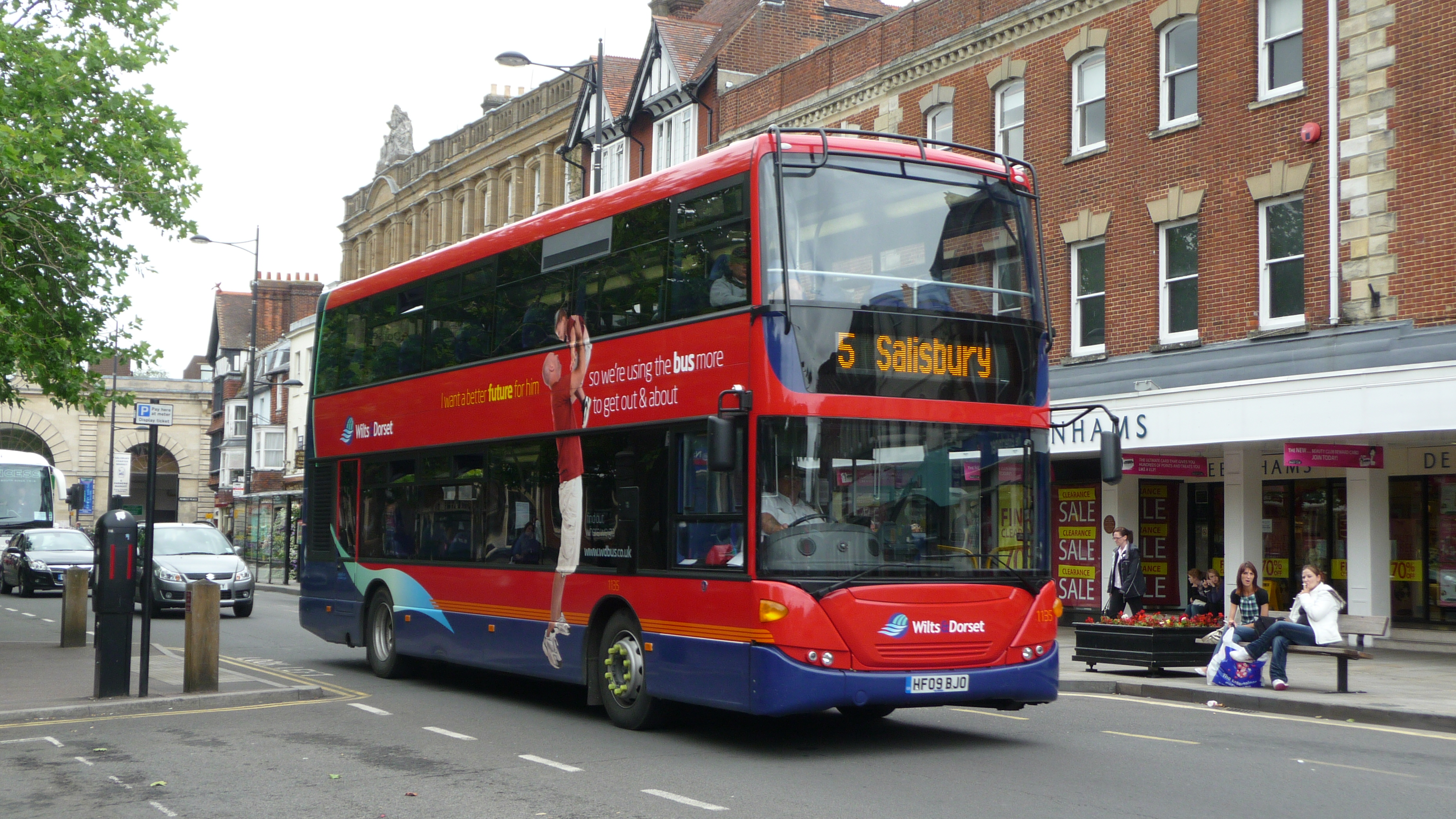
Wilts & Dorset Scania OmniCity in Salisbury in July 2009

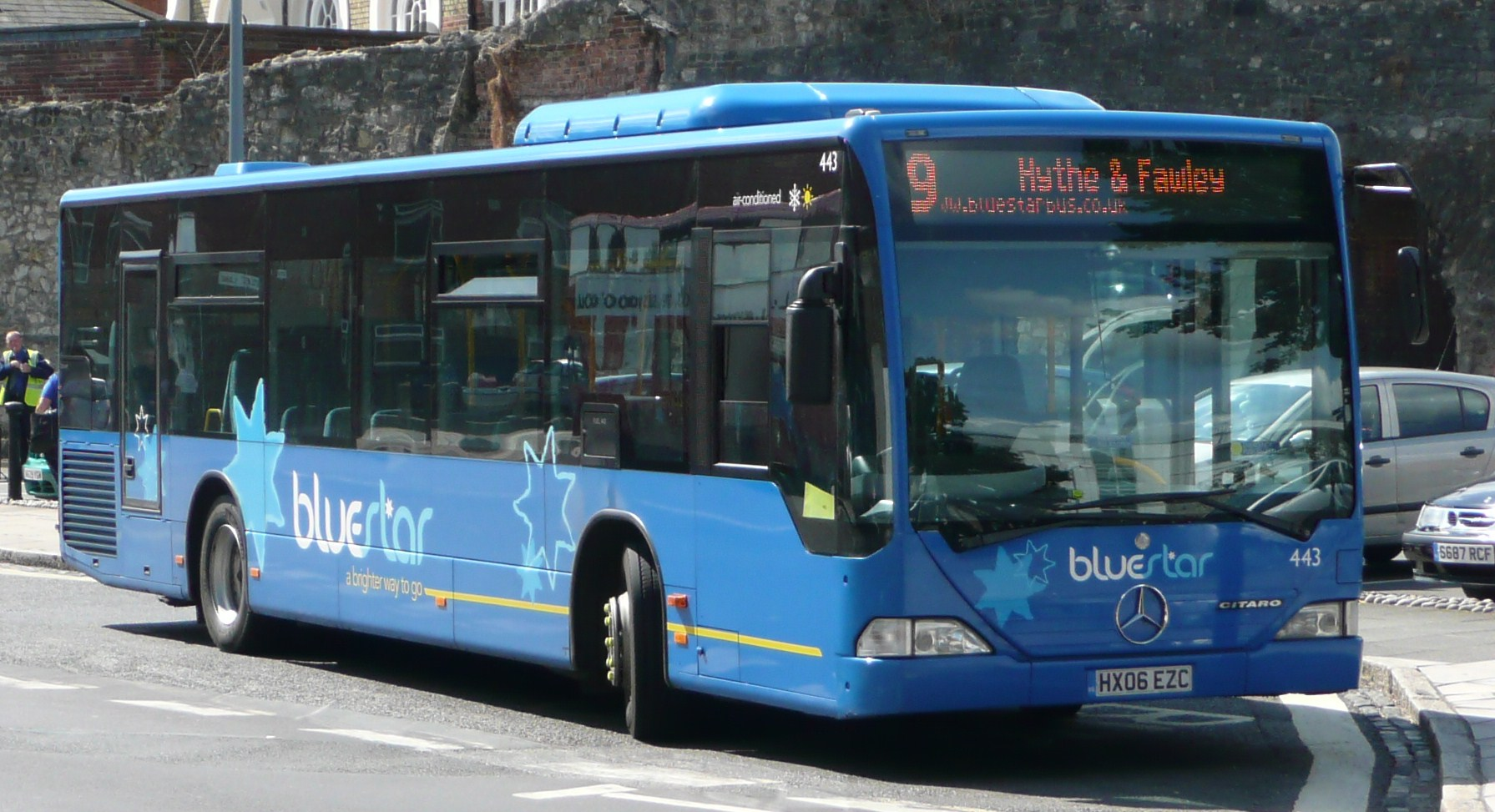
Bluestar Mercedes-Benz Citaro in Southampton in August 2008

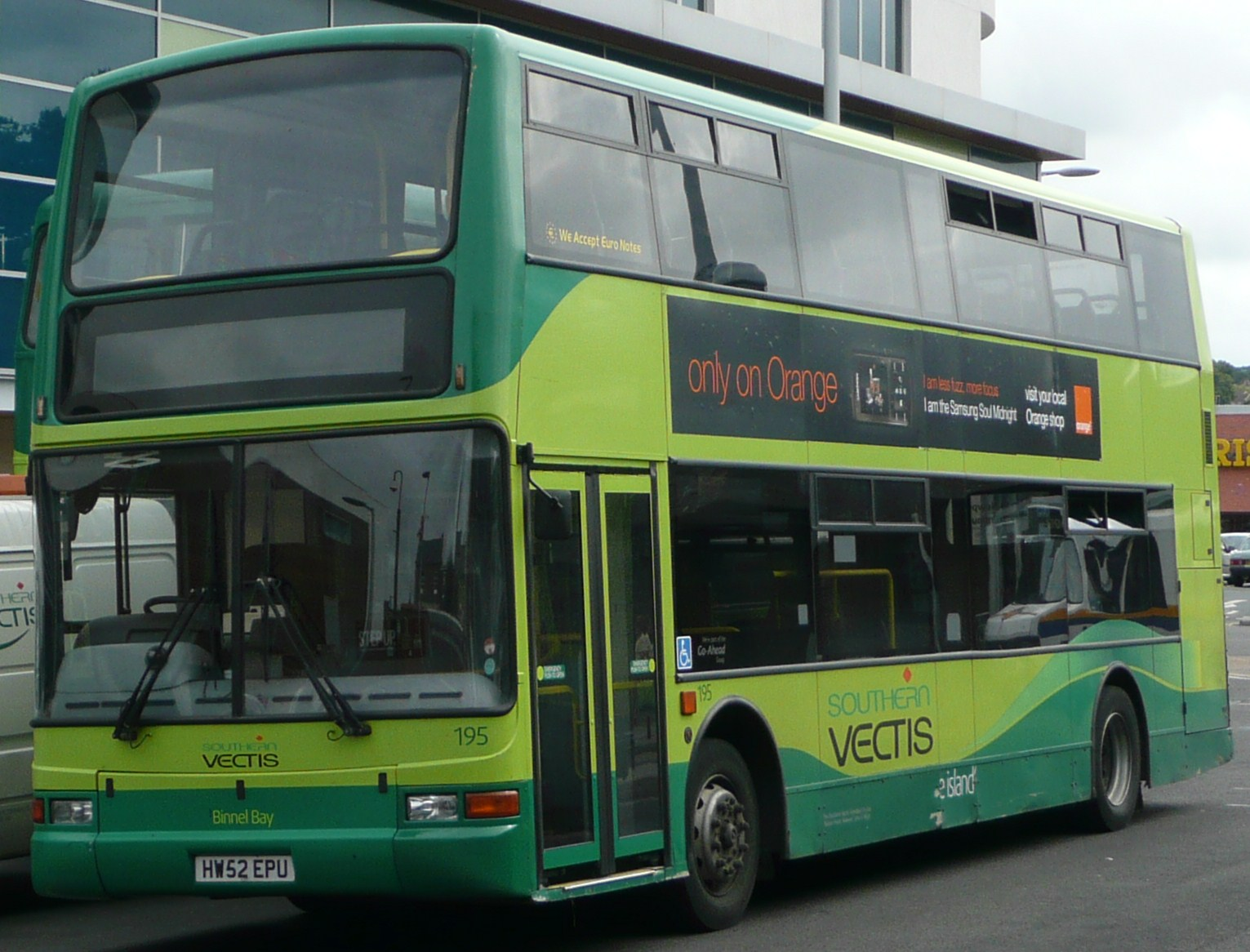
Southern Vectis Plaxton President bodied Volvo B7TL in Newport in August 2008

In August 2003 the Go-Ahead Group purchased the business of Wilts & Dorset, including its Damory Coaches and Tourist Group subsidiaries, followed in July 2005 by Southern Vectis including its Solent Blue Line subsidiary. In February 2006 Wilts & Dorset purchased bus refurbishment company Hants & Dorset Trim.

Later in 2006, Go-Ahead consolidated the management of its south coast operations under Go South Coast in Poole.

In October 2006, Marchwood Motorways was purchased and integrated into Bluestar.

Thamesdown Transport was purchased from Swindon Borough Council in February 2017 and rebranded as Swindon's Bus Company.

In May 2025, Managing Director Andrew Wickham died, reportedly after a long illness, at age 58. Wickham was a respected figure in the UK bus industry where he had worked for almost 40 years, and was appointed MBE in 2024 for services to the industry. Ben Murray, Go South Coast's Finance Director, took over as interim Managing Director of the company.

== Subsidiaries ==
All public bus services come under local brands, which have distinct liveries. These are:

- Bluestar – The brand for Southampton
  - Unilink – The brand for the University of Southampton
- Morebus – The brand for Bournemouth, Christchurch and Poole
  - UNIBUS – The brand for Bournemouth University and Arts University Bournemouth
- Salisbury Reds – The brand for Salisbury
- Southern Vectis – The brand for the Isle of Wight
- Swindon's Bus Company (formerly Thamesdown Transport) – The brand for Swindon

The company also has three coach brands:

- Excelsior Coaches – Bournemouth, offering private coach hire, school services and tours
- Damory Coaches – school buses and services in central East Dorset
- Tourist Group – Dorset and Wiltshire, providing services to schools in Wiltshire

The company has a bus refurbishment and repair shop, 'Hants and Dorset Trim', based in Eastleigh.

== Fleet ==
As at May 2023, Go South Coast operated over 850 buses and coaches from thirteen depots.
