= Marchwood Motorways =

British bus operating company

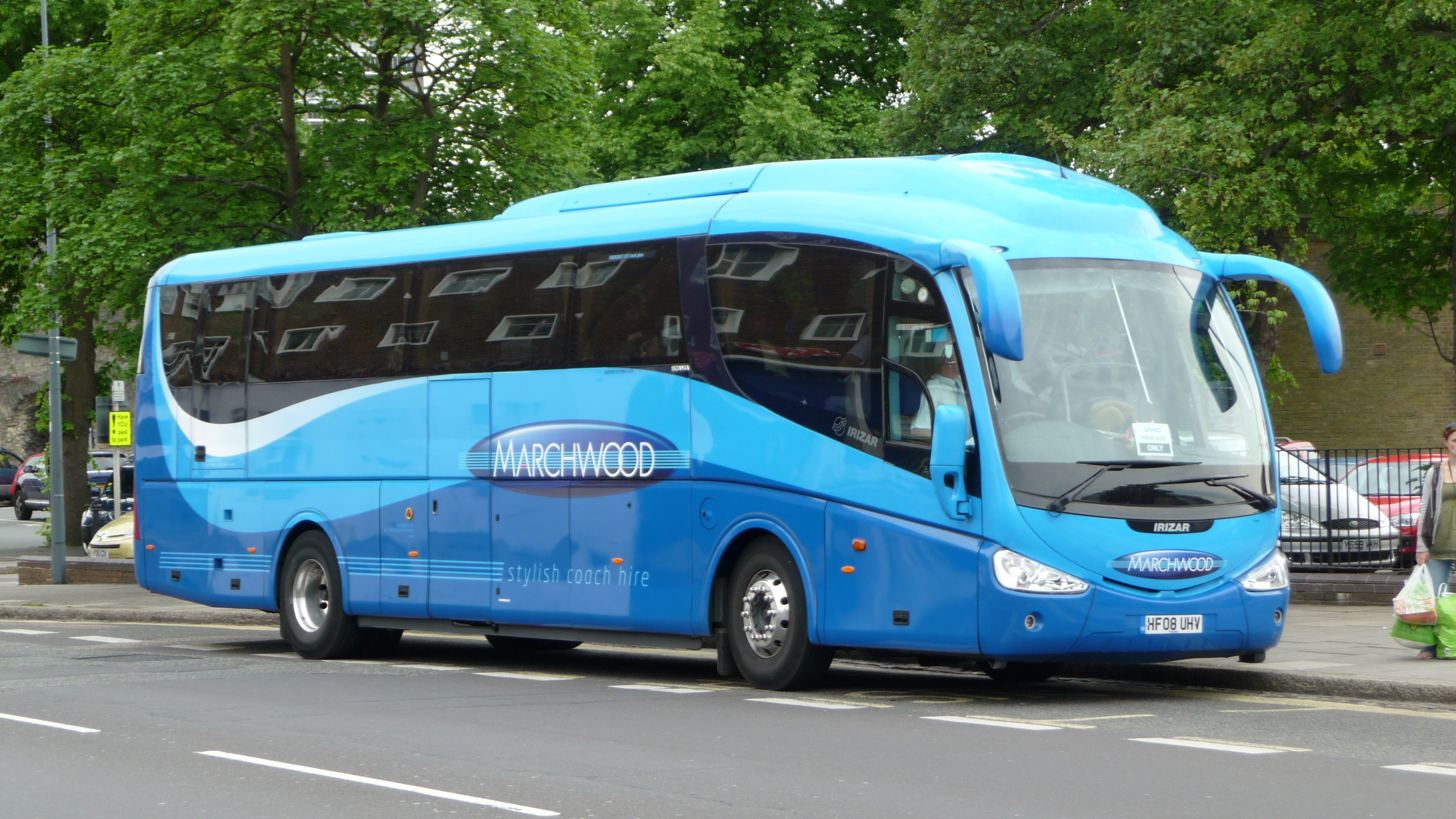
- Irizar PB bodied Scania K340EB in Southampton in March 2009 in Go South Coast coach livery
- Parent: Go South Coast (part of the Go-Ahead Group)
- Founded: 1940s
- Defunct: 3 July 2010
- Headquarters: Totton
- Service area: Hampshire; Pembrokeshire
- Service type: Bus & coach services
- Fleet: 51 (October 2006)
- Website: www.marchwoodcoaches.co.uk (archive)

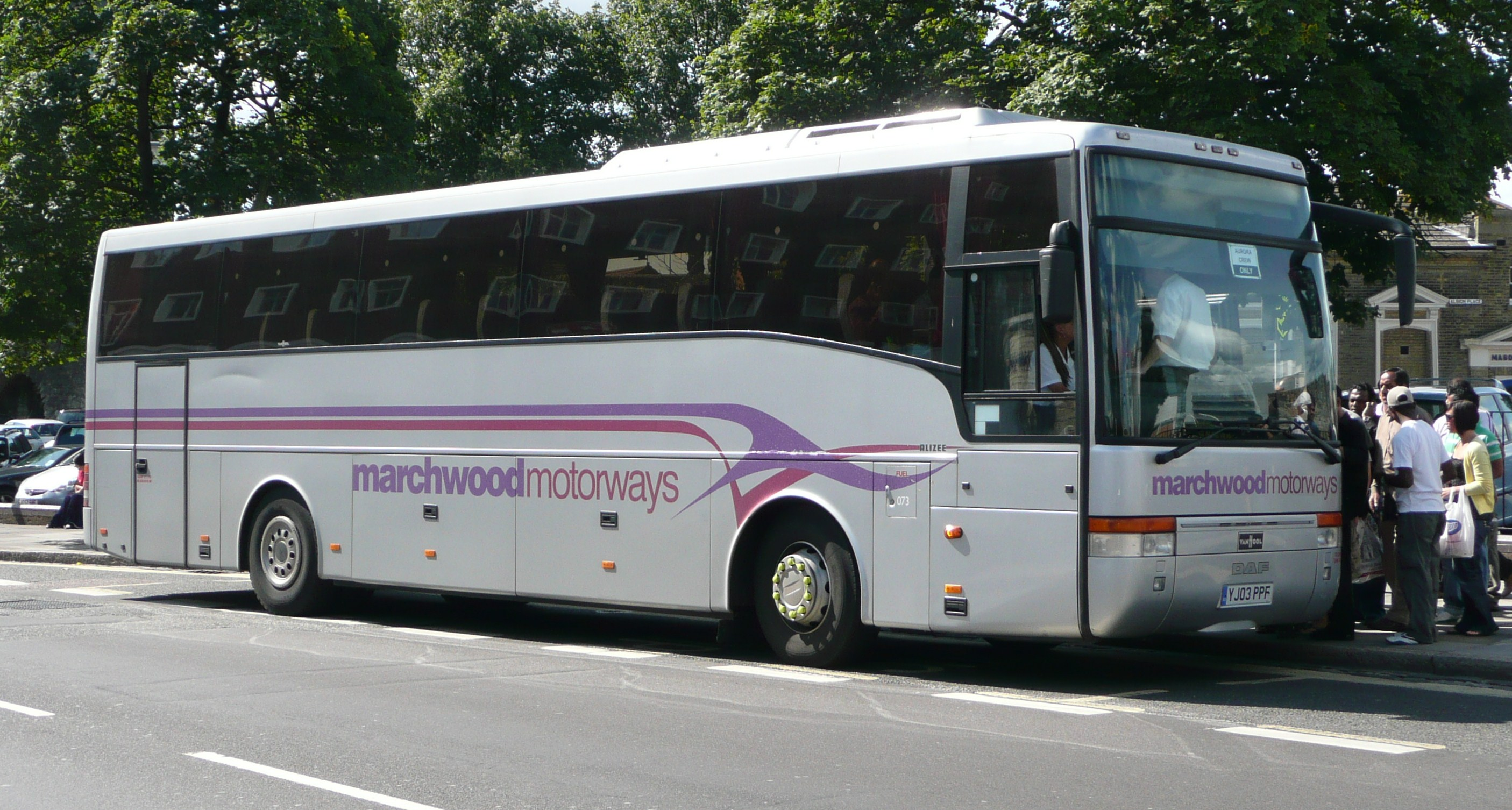
Van Hool Alizee bodied DAF coach in the previous Marchwood Motorways livery in August 2008

Marchwood Motorways was a bus and coach operator based in Totton, Hampshire. Formed as an independent in the 1940s, it was a subsidiary of the Go-Ahead Group from 2006 until it became dormant in 2010. Its operations were subsumed by those of Bluestar, but its licence remains legally separate.

== History ==
Marchwood Motorways was formed in the 1940s. In the 1960s, Marchwood Motorways established a subsidiary in Haverfordwest to operate services during the construction of the Pembroke Refinery, requiring 60 coaches, at its peak. In the 1970s, Marchwood purchased the business of Bill Colins of Roch, including a service from Haverfordwest to St Davids. This was sold, in 1982, to Richards Bros.

In July 2006, a major fire at the company's Totton depot, caused by arson, destroyed three buses and offices, causing an estimated £250,000 of damage.

In October 2006, Marchwood Motorways was purchased by the Go-Ahead Group with 51 buses and coaches. The company became part of Solent Blue Line. Marchwood had an unusual, but long standing arrangement, to run buses under franchise to Solent Blue Line on Southampton routes 18 and 19. Most of the buses were bodied with the DAF chassis including eleven Wright Cadet bodied SB120s and two East Lancs Myllennium Lowlander bodied DB250s.

In December 2008, the company took part in an Asda scheme to fill a coach with Christmas presents for charity. It was hoped that customers would fill the coach with up to 2,000 gifts.

It continued to operate as a separate brand until 2009, with its operations integrated into Go South Coast and the company becoming dormant in 2010, however for a time in October 2013, some buses continued to operate under the Marchwood Motorways licence.

== Incidents ==
October 2006 saw an attack on one of the company's vehicles, a stone being thrown at a school coach nearly injuring pupils.

Along with Solent Blue Line, in May 2008, the company was found to have been running services to lower than expected reliability levels, and faced a fine from the Traffic Commissioner.
