= Bluestar (bus company) =

Bus company in Southampton, England

- Alexander Dennis Enviro400 MMC in Southampton in March 2026
- Parent: Go South Coast (part of the Go-Ahead Group)
- Founded: May 1987; 39 years ago
- Headquarters: Southampton
- Locale: Southern Hampshire
- Service type: Bus service
- Routes: 29
- Destinations: Southampton; Eastleigh; Winchester; Totton; Romsey; New Forest
- Depots: Southampton, Eastleigh, Totton, Lymington
- Fleet: 182 Bluestar; 32 Unilink
- Chief executive: Ed Wills
- Website: www.bluestarbus.co.uk

Solent Blue Line Limited is a bus operator in Southampton, trading under Bluestar since 2003. The operator provide services in Southampton and the surrounding areas of Hampshire. Bluestar are a company that operate within the Go South Coast sector of the Go-Ahead Group.

== History ==
Past Logos

Solent Blue Line logo used between 1987 and 2003

Solent Blue Line logo used between 2003 and 2008

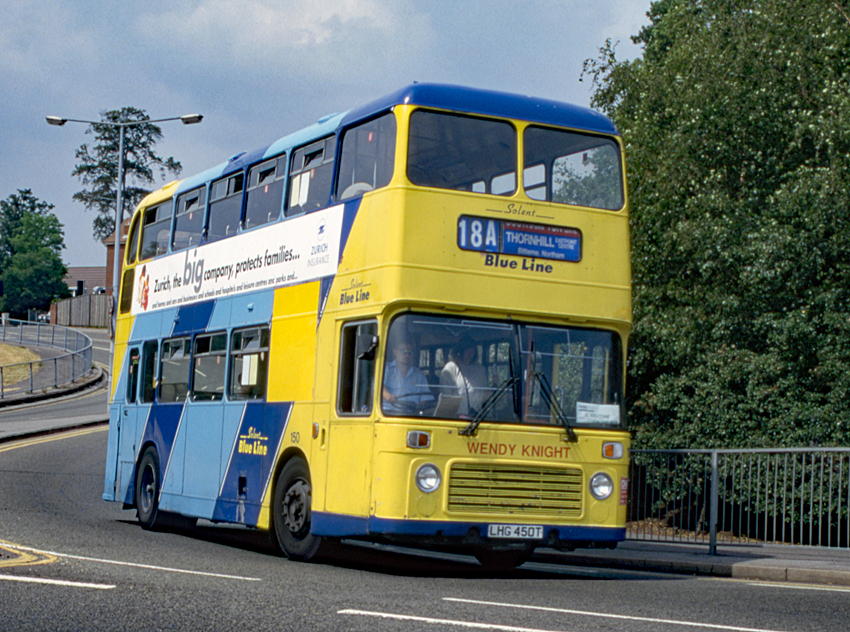
Solent Blue Line Bristol VRT/SL3 ECW in Bitterne - June 1996

=== Origins ===
In 1987, Musterphantom Limited was created by John Chadwick and Peter Shelley. £100,000 was then raised to start operations in May 1987. £75,000 of which came from Southern Vectis, with the new company ending up as a subsidiary. The new company received old Southern Vectis Bristol VRTs to start operating. Chadwick & Shelley (both former managers at Citybus) and Southern Vectis both wanted to challenge the position of Southampton Citybus, which operated most routes within Southampton.

=== Expansion ===
In October 1987, The Hants & Sussex Bus Company was purchased by Solent Blue Line, from Basil Williams. This deal was finalised on 3 October 1987.

Throughout the 1980s, the National Bus Company was privatised and forcibly demerged. The bus market as a whole was deregulated. This resulted in Hants & Dorset being broken into three new companies in 1983. One of these was Hampshire Bus, which became part of Stagecoach South in April 1987. The Southampton and Eastleigh arm of this company was then sold to Solent Blue Line on 4 October 1987. The sale included 82 buses, the Eastleigh Chickenhall Lane depot and the local routes.

After less than a year operating, the company had gone from 16 buses to over 115. It had also developed a significant network. Due to this, rationalisation was undertaken, with the company restructuring its operations. By 1988, it was in a good position to challenge CityBus. In the next five years, the company bought new vehicles, so that in 1993, 1 in 3 of its buses were new. At this point, some services started to be run under franchise by Marchwood Motorways, with them operating route '30' and '32' from Totton to Southampton. This would later expand to include route '18' and '19'. This was based out of their Totton Salisbury Road depot. Brijan Tours was also used to run some services.

=== Start of the Century ===
In 2003, Solent Blue Line carried out a rebrand, involving a new name and the launch of the Bluestar brand soon after, as a name for their core services. Bluestar services 1 and 2 launched in 2004, the 3 and 4 services commenced operations a year later, and the Waterside services 8 and 9 had fully launched by 2006.

In July 2005 Solent Blue Line was included in the sale of Southern Vectis to the Go-Ahead Group. The head office functions of the company were consolidated with those of the other Go South Coast companies, Southern Vectis and Wilts & Dorset, in Poole.

In March 2006, the company changed its legal name to Solent Blue Line. Then in October, Solent Blue Line purchased Marchwood Motorways. After the withdrawal of the Red Rocket brand on 25 February 2008, most of the company's services began to run under the Bluestar brand.

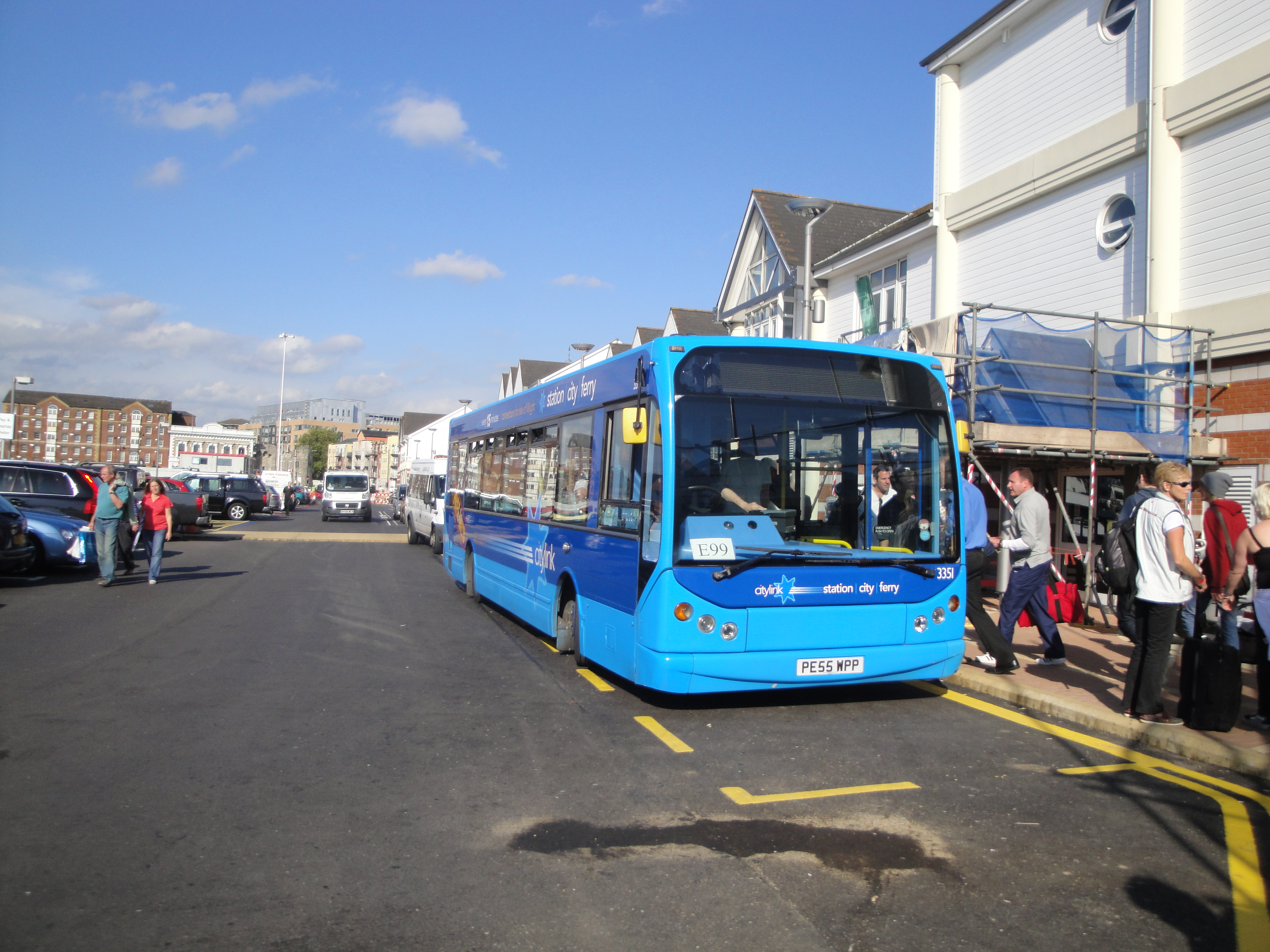
Myllennium Dart in city-link livery at the Red Funnel terminal in September 2011

In September 2008, Bluestar commenced running City-Link, which initially was a free shuttle between Town Quay and Southampton Central Station. The two buses used on the service were Dennis Darts inherited from Enterprise, the previous operator, and were repainted in a new two-tone blue livery with the interiors re-branded.

The service was re-branded as QuayConnect in May 2016 with a new red and white livery featuring Red Jet 6, along with free WiFi and real time departure information.

=== 2010s ===
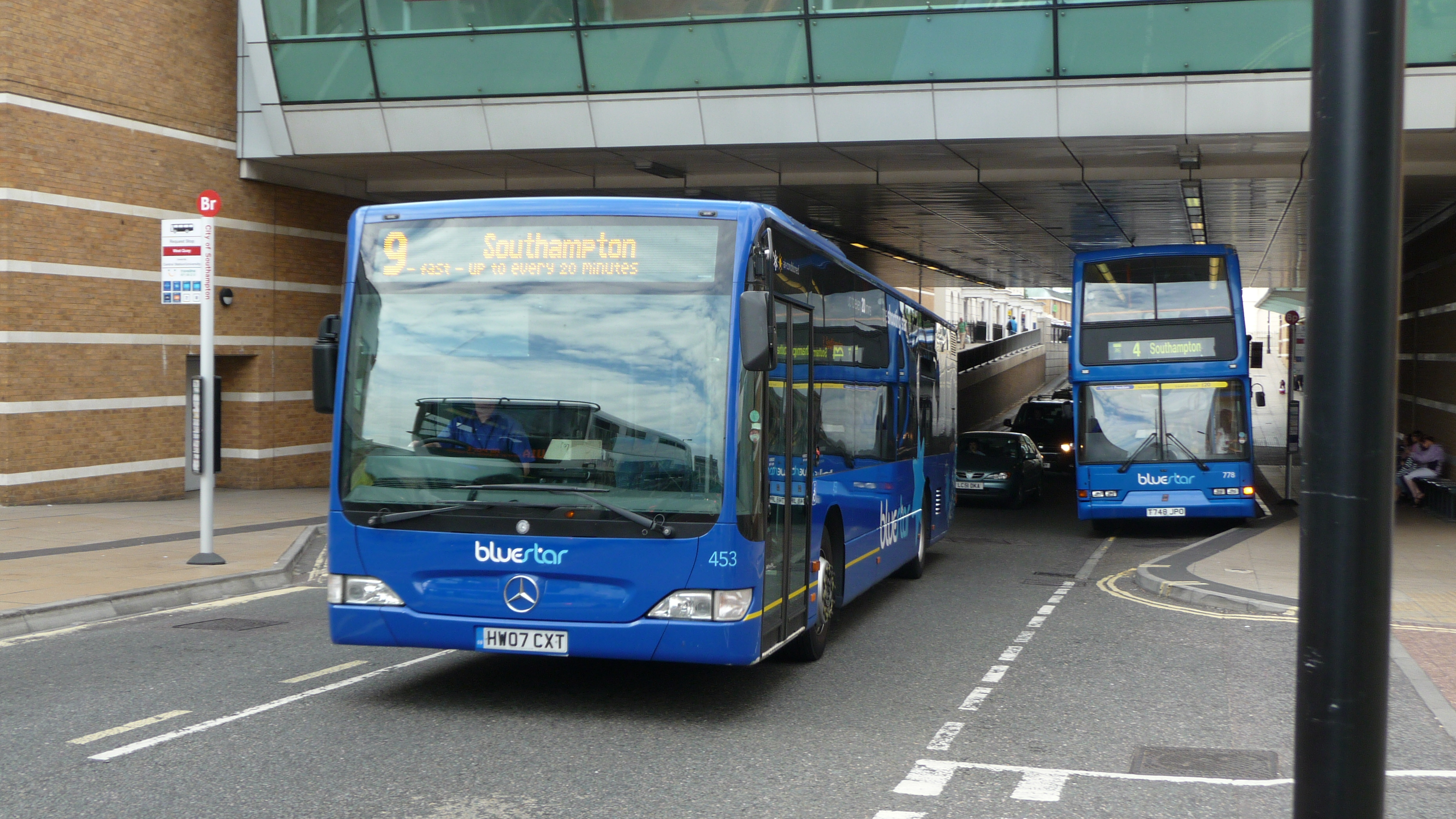
Mercedes-Benz Citaro and East Lancs Lolyne in Bluestar Livery in August 2010.

Since 2010, the fleet had undergone several updates including:

- USB charging points
- Tap on, Tap off (contactless payments)
- Live Tracking
- Low emission engines (Euro 6)
- Next-stop announcements (visual and audio)
- Free WiFi (Disabled)

Bluestar was awarded £0.23m in funding from the Department of Transport to roll out Wi-Fi on 120 buses, although this has now been withdrawn due to the growth in 4G and 5G usage. Contactless card payments were introduced in June 2017, on all Bluestar and Unilink buses, as part of a £1.6m investment from Hampshire County Council. Finally, Bluestar once had Smartcard called 'the Key'. This worked on all Go South Coast services. This was withdrawn in June 2023, due to low usage, alongside the high uptake of Tap on, Tap off.

==== Bus Trials ====
The company trialled a Wright StreetDeck with a set of dual doors in February 2018 whether passengers could effectively board and de-board through the front and rear doors. The bus was loaned from Brighton & Hove for trialling on Bluestar route 18. Later in November of the same year, the company unveiled 19 ADL Enviro400 Cities, replacing the single deck buses used on the route the trials took place on.

Bluestar has also been one of the test sites for new air filter technology which removes and captures particulates from the atmosphere. A test has been done in September 2018 for 100 days and has claimed to have cleaned 3.2 million cubic metres. It is planned that these will be fitted onto buses nationwide on Go Ahead's buses. To accompany this, they have also installed solar panels onto the roof of the test bus to see if the filter can be made to run on its own power. 16 more buses have been installed with solar panels to reduce maintenance costs and fuel consumption. There are 6 buses with the air filter, including the original with the prototype air filter installed on ADL Enviro200 MMC types, wearing the Bluestar "breathe" branding.

Aside from the air filter trials, the company had also carried out feasibility trials for battery electric vehicles with Southampton City council. These trials took place in June 2021.

=== 2020s ===
Towards the end of November 2022, First Hampshire & Dorset announced the intention to withdraw their Southampton-based operations following low patronage levels and increased operating costs. This took place on 19th February 2023, with Bluestar adding six replacement routes to its network, servicing the areas where the former company operated.

In July 2023, Xelabus reduced their public bus network and transferred their X4 and X7 routes to the company, subsequently being renumbered to 24 and 23 respectively. During October 2024, the company gained two more services from Xelabus, renumbered to 21 and 22.

In December 2023, Bluestar had won the award of "UK Bus Operator of the Year", along with three accolades. These were awarded by the annual UK Bus award scheme, as Bluestar had won this award twice in 2017 and 2018.

During 2024, Bluestar received sixteen Enviro400 MMCs allocated mainly to routes 2 and 7, as well as eighteen cascaded single decker buses from Bournemouth. Twelve refurbished double decker buses also gradually entered service with the operator to phase out temporary buses on cross city route 19, and at a later date, route 19a.

In March 2025, the operator introduced ten double decker buses with “theone” branding to replace the existing fleet of buses operating on the Bluestar 1 route between Southampton and Winchester. The replacements offer USB charging ports, stop bells upstairs behind each seat, and brand new Euro 6 engine technology, which significantly reduces emissions from the exhaust and helps the environment.

== Services ==
=== Bluestar 1 (Southampton to Winchester) ===
Bluestar 1 is the flagship service of the network, and runs the corridor from Southampton to Winchester, via Bassett, Chilworth, Chandlers Ford, Shawford, Otterbourne and St Cross. It was previously known as the 47 mostly before the rebrand to Bluestar in 2003. Upon the initial launch to the 1 in 2009, Bluestar held an event for the first seven buses dedicated to this route, in February of that year. These buses were of the Scania OmniCity type, using Scania N230UD in-house chassis. The 1 service consequently has had several fleets of vehicles over its life, ranging from the introduction of Alexander Dennis Enviro400s in September 2013, the most iconic set of vehicles on the Alexander Dennis Enviro400 MMC design in October 2016, and the most recent as of April 2026 are 2025 variants of the third generation vehicles, featuring stop-start engine technology, the ADL Smartseats fitted on board, and cameras to replace the front overhang mirrors.

=== Bluestar 19/19a (Thornhill to Lordshill) ===
Upon First Southampton takeover of the 19 in February 2023, it retains its frequency of 15 minutes from its initial trial, but was extended beyond the Southampton Central Railway Station to match the route 3. Another change was the upgrade to full double decker operation under the new operator, using thirteen temporary Go North East Wright Eclipse Gemini buses. They were rather quickly withdrawn, following noise pollution complaints. One resident even compared their noise level to jet engines.

The original vehicles were replaced with twelve Dennis Trident Optare Olympus vehicles from London General. (Image credit H&D Trim.)

In February 2025, as part of Bluestar annual timetable improvements, a new route 19a was launched following years of feedback about service down the Hill Lane area adjacent to Southampton Common. The service operates every 30 minutes, on an alternated timetable.

=== Unilink ===
The Unilink services are run under contract by Bluestar, in partnership with the University of Southampton. All services share a common section at the Highfield Lane Bus Hub, which houses the university main campus.

=== Nightstar ===
Nightstar is a network of night-time running services which mirror a select few daytime services. It originally commenced in 2004 where services ran on Friday and Saturday nights and were aimed at people who had a night out in Southampton. The service commenced alongside the new bluestar services and ran from 00:45 until 03:45. All services began at Leisure World, Southampton and made their way past other large clubs before completing its route. These routes generally followed those of their daytime number counterparts with additional stops to take into account destinations served by other routes. The routes spanned from Winchester in the North, Langley in the west and Hamble in the east. In February 2014, all but the Unilink U1N ceased to run due to council funding cuts.

Nightstar was reintroduced in April 2024, with Bluestar operating route 1 throughout Friday and Saturday nights, numbered 'N1' during the night. It diverts from the usual route in Winchester, allowing it to serve the Royal Hampshire County Hospital. This route is funded by Hampshire County Council, through their 'Bus Service Improvement Plan'. As a result of a partnership with Bluestar, Hampshire County Council and Southampton City Council, Routes 2, 17 and 18 gained 24/7 services that commenced on 31st August 2025. As part of a further £6.3m scheme from the Hampshire County Council, route 9 will begin to run on Friday and Saturday nights under the 'N9' number, which is due to start in September 2026.

=== QuayConnect ===
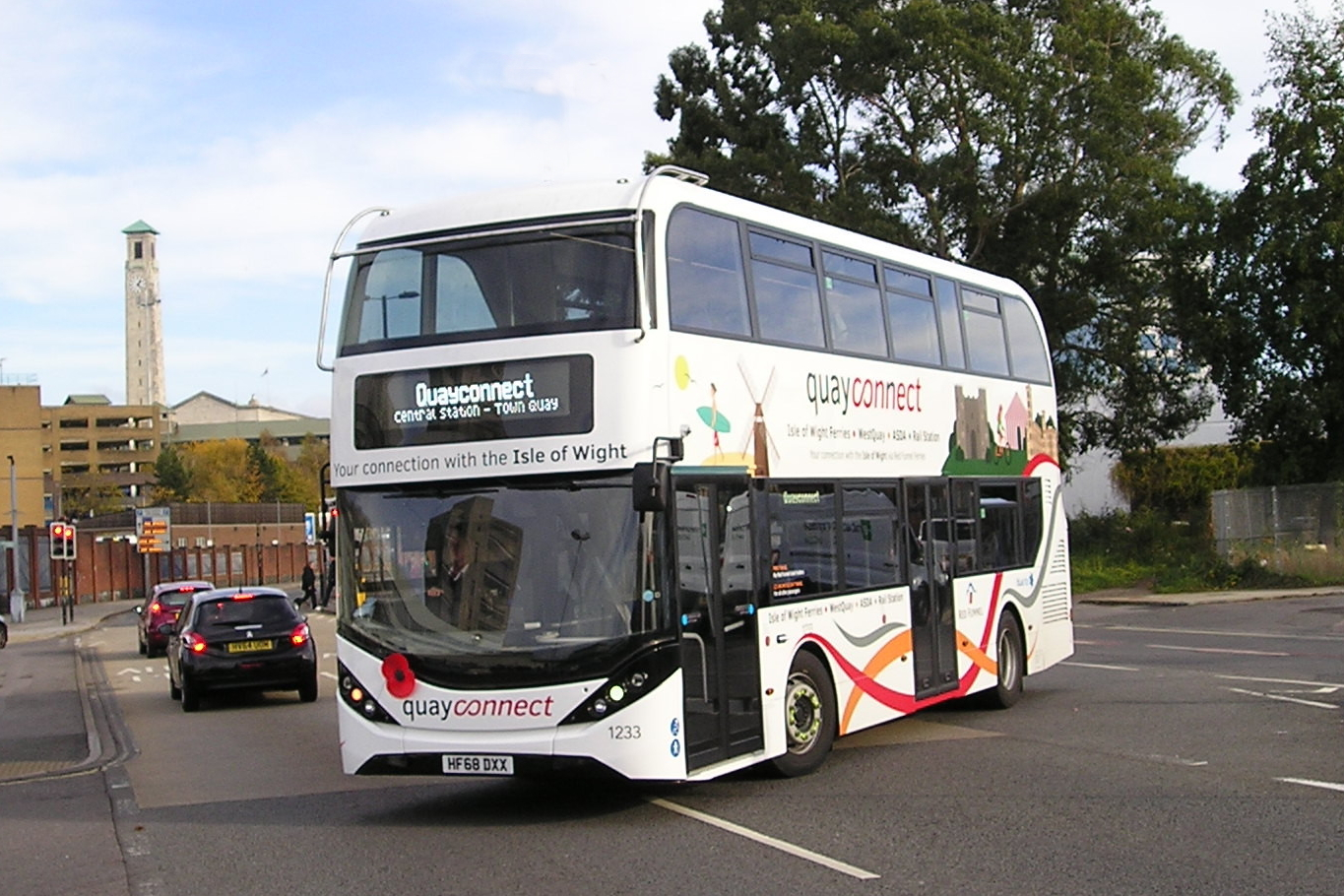
QuayConnect bus approaching Southampton Central Station in November 2018.

QuayConnect is a service contracted by Red Funnel since 2014, between Central Station and the Red Funnel terminal. Originally known as CityLink, it offers free rides for Red Funnel ticket holders.

The service had its origins in February 2000, commencing in September 2000 as a network of two services funded by Southampton City Council, WestQuay and Red Funnel to commemorate the opening of the WestQuay, with the purpose to facilitate transport for shoppers. First Hampshire & Dorset originally operated the "CityLink" and "CityLoop"; the former running every 10 minutes between Town Quay and Central Station, the latter every half hour between Town Quay and Leisureworld via Central Station, Southampton coach station and The Quay Leisure centre. CityLoop was later axed in October 2007. Bluestar later took over the CityLink service in September 2008.

Southampton City Council announced their decision to cut funding to CityLink in February 2014, which put the service at risk of being withdrawn. WestQuay then made the same decision in April 2014, which left Red Funnel to step up to take over the CityLink contract. With Red Funnel the sole contractor of CityLink, this meant that the service was reduced to every half hour, and passengers without Red Funnel tickets would have to pay a fee. These changes were put into effect in May 2014.

Since 2014, modifications to the service were put in place: the name of the service was changed to "QuayConnect", with a bus sporting a new livery and amenities such as WiFi and USB ports in April 2016. A brand-new double decker bus was purchased for exclusive use on the service in November 2018, replacing the single decker that had operated the service since its inception. The reduction of the frequency of the service was dropped to every hour in April 2021 after its suspension for 12 months.

=== Bluestar 26 ===
Bluestar 26 is a new route starting Sunday 30th August. It will link Southampton and Whiteley using Hampshire County Council funding.

=== New Forest Tour ===
The New Forest Tour are a trio of circular tourist routes in the New Forest. All three routes use open-top buses, of which are operated jointly by Bluestar and Morebus.

=== New Forest Breezer 81, 82, 86 ===
The New Forest Breezer service runs every hour, Monday to Saturday, and every other hour on Sundays and public holidays. Since December 2025, routes 6, X1, X2 (now New Forest Breezer 81, 82, 86) has been slowly overhauled using buses branded under morebus New Forest Breezer scheme.

=== South Downs Rambler ===
Summer-seasonal route running on Sundays and bank holidays. This route passes through the South Downs National Park, from Winchester railway station to Petersfield railway station, via Hinton Ampner, Bramdean, West Meon, Exton and East Meon. It passes notable attractions such as Winchester Science Centre, Cheesefoot Head, Hinton Ampner House, Old Winchester Hill and Langrish House. The service is ran in partnership with South Downs National Park Authority. It is funded by Hampshire County Council and CrossCountry trains.

=== Park and Ride Services ===
==== Bluestar PR1/PR2 (Weekend/Events Park and Ride) ====
Two services, dubbed “PR1” and “PR2” respectively, allow customers to enter the city centre from Adanac Park towards Westquay or St Mary’s for Southampton Stadium. PR1 operates every 20 minutes on weekends and bank holidays, and PR2 operates every 20 minutes for 3 hours before Southampton FC match games, and then for 2 hours after the match ends. Both services run with funding from the Bus Service Improvement Plan.

==== NHS Park & Ride ====
Since 2022, Bluestar has operated a Park & Ride service between Southampton General Hospital and Adanac Park Health and Innovation Campus, which has a multi-storey car park, located next to the M271 motorway. The bus service operates every 15 minutes in the peak, with the service only being available to NHS staff.

== Former Services ==
=== Red Rocket ===
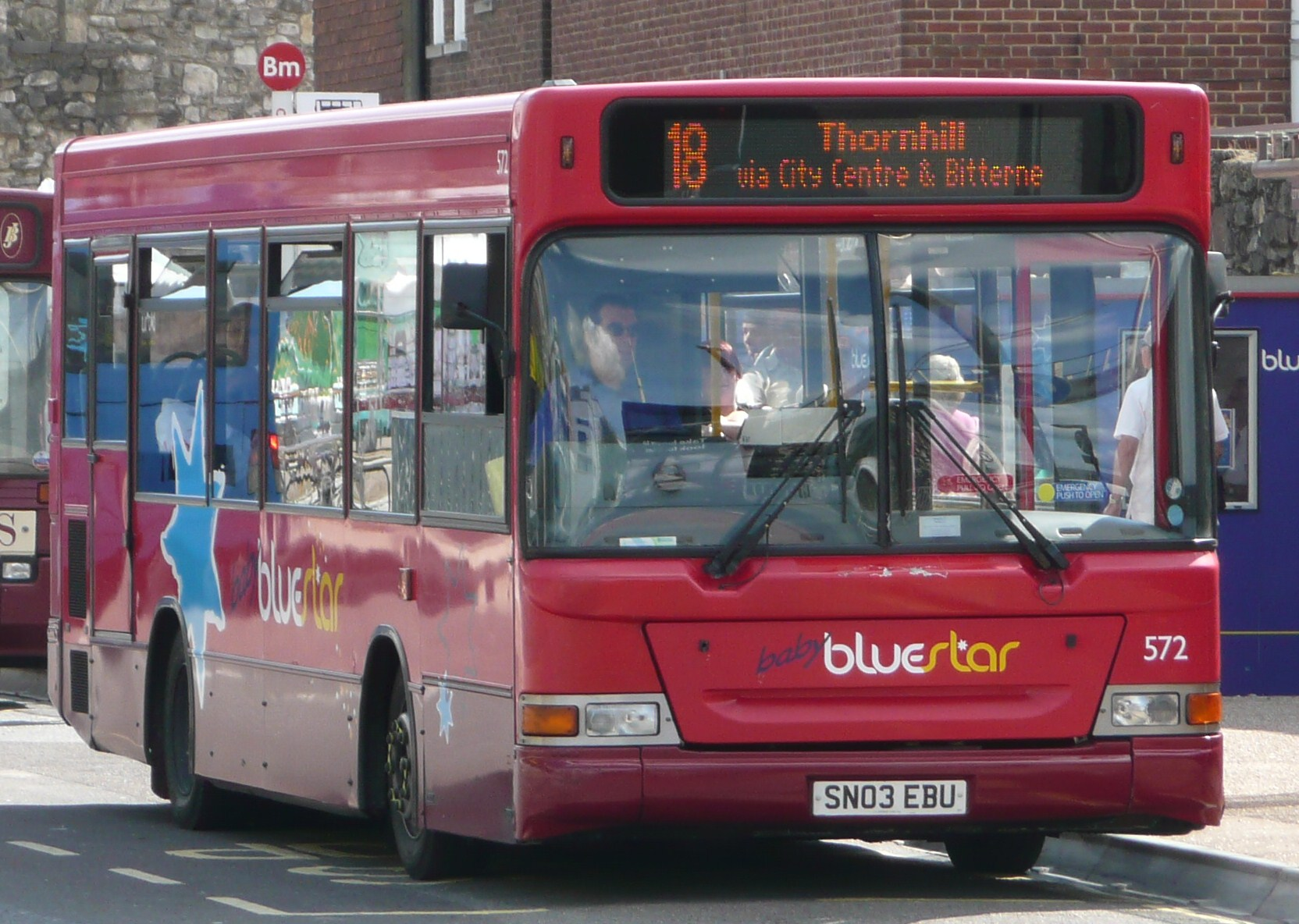
Plaxton Pointer bodied Dennis Dart in Red Rocket colours with a subsequently added Baby Bluestar logo in 2008

Red Rocket was launched on 3 September 2006 as a high frequency network centred on Eastleigh, extending to Winchester in the north and Hamble-le-Rice in the south. There were originally six Red Rocket routes, lettered to avoid confusion with the Bluestar and Solent Blue Line service in operation at the time. Red Rocket services were either withdrawn or re-branded to Baby Bluestar on 24 February 2008.

=== Baby Bluestar ===
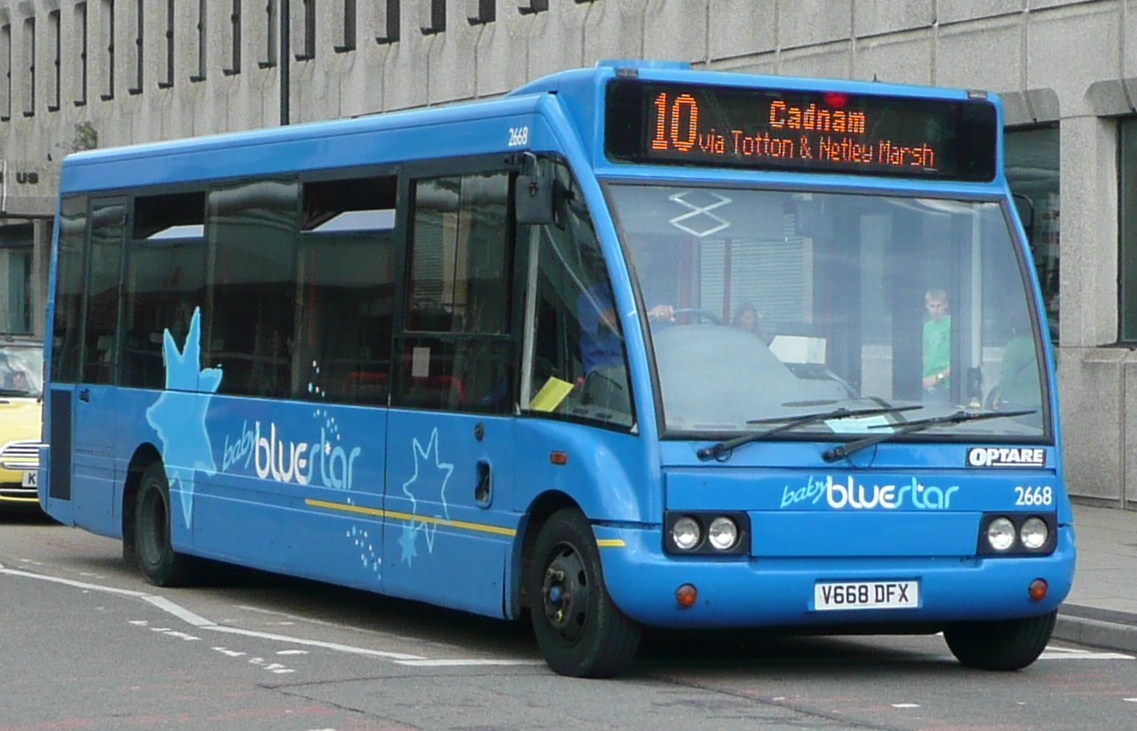
Optare Solo in Baby Bluestar livery in May 2008

Between 2008 and 2010, Bluestar used Baby Bluestar branding for their local services. There were eleven Baby Bluestar services, many of which have stopped running due to subsidy cuts from both Southampton City council and Hampshire County council. Bluestar continues to operate the H1 and H2. All other routes have either been given to new operators, like Xelabus, or no longer run.

=== Solent Shuttle ===
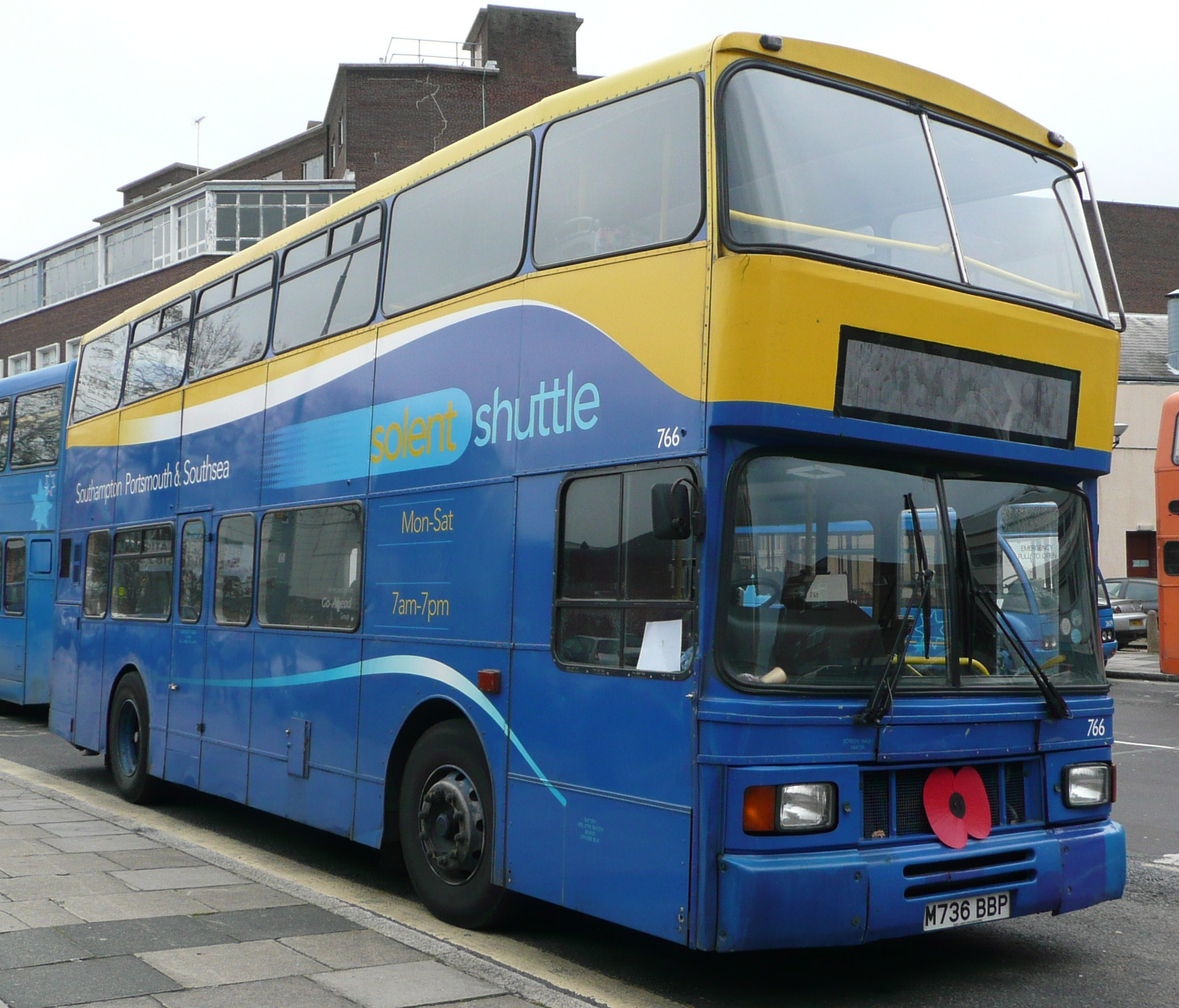
East Lancs E Type bodied Volvo Olympian in Solent Shuttle livery in November 2008

The Solent Shuttle was an express bus link that ran between Portsmouth and Southampton. The service itself was established in 1976 as a joint venture between Hants & Dorset and Southdown Motor Services, between passing on to other operators including Southampton City Bus, First Hampshire & Dorset and Tellings-Golden Miller; First branded the services as the 727 and the 747 while Tellings-Golden Miller branded it the Solent Clipper, under the service names the X27 and the X47.

Solent Blue Line took over the service, but ran into difficulties following the cessation of funding from Portsmouth and Southampton City Councils. The service was due to close on 2 June 2007, but by popular demand and with the support of pensioners associations in both cities, the service continued on a two-hourly basis. However, the service ceased two years later on 21 February 2009.

=== Do the Docks ===
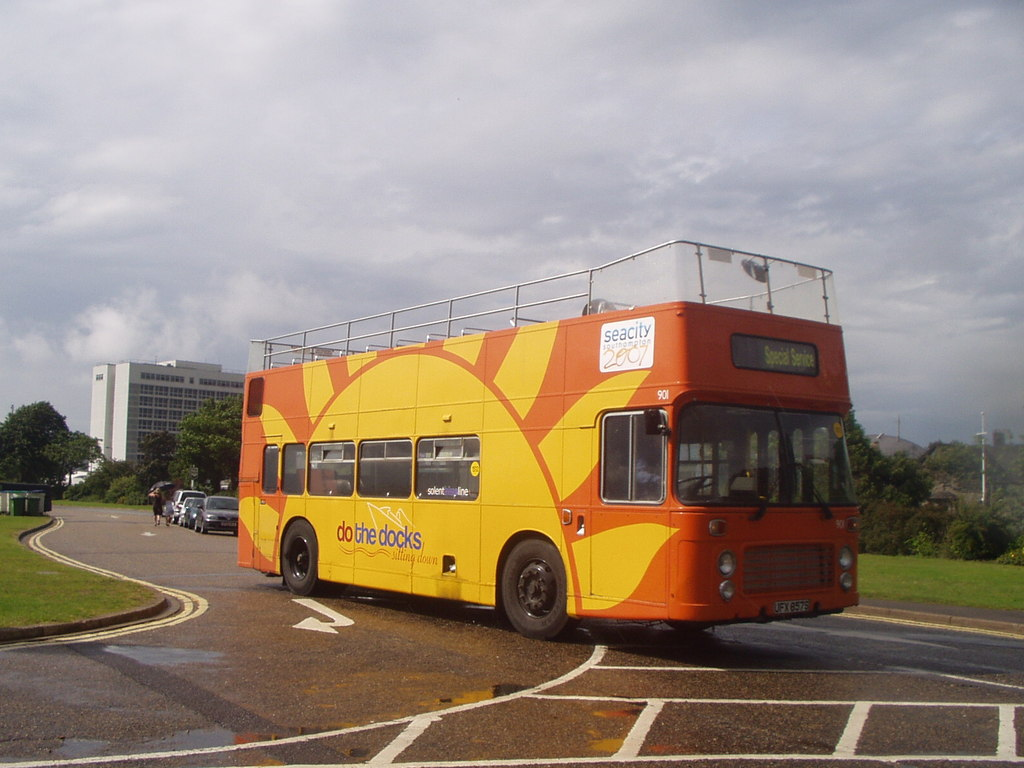
ECW bodied Bristol VRT in 'Do the Docks' livery in June 2007

The 'Do the Docks' tour was an open-top bus tour of Southampton docks, using open-top buses from the New Forest Tour and a debranded Wilts & Dorset Leyland Olympian. The service changed on 29 July 2007 as a result of low passenger numbers following poor weather during the 2007 summer season, with the service losing its "turn up and hop on" format and becoming a chartered service. The route saw a brief reprieve in April 2008, when the service ran for two days on 26 and 27 of that month, as part of the Caribbean festival in Southampton. As Solent Blue Line no longer had the open-top buses for the routes, a hired Southern Vectis open-top bus was used.

== Fleet ==
Bluestar operate a fleet of roughly 327 buses, 88 single deckers and 239 double deckers. Bluestar frequently uses buses transferred from other companies within Go South Coast. 32 buses are allocated to Unilink.

== Depots ==
=== Southampton Empress Road ===
This depot was acquired from First Hampshire and Dorset in 2023, after they closed the depot, along with withdrawing their Southampton services. This depot then became Bluestar HQ. It was purpose built in 2010, being paid for by the sale of the old First depot in Portswood. The depot has a maximum capacity of 134 buses. Unilink buses are also based at this depot.

=== Eastleigh Chickenhall Lane ===
Eastleigh was at the centre of Bluestar operations until 2023, when it was superseded by the new Southampton Depot. It was originally a depot for Hants & Dorset, but was transferred to Hampshire Bus in 1983, when the company was divided into 3 separate companies. Hampshire Bus was then bought by Stagecoach South, who sold the Eastleigh arm of the company to Solent Blue Line in 1987, which gained the Eastleigh Depot, 82 vehicles and the local routes. In 2022 (before the opening of the Southampton Depot), this depot looked after 86 buses. Unilink buses are also based at this depot. The Depot building is physically connected to the Hants & Dorset Trim building, which is also owned by Go South Coast.

=== Totton Salisbury Road ===
This depot was acquired by Solent Blue Line, when it bought Marchwood Motorways in 2006. Marchwood Motorways had been operating under a franchise agreement with Solent Blue Line for a long time by this point, with most of its vehicles being painted in Solent Blue Line liveries. With the acquisition, Solent Blue Line gained the depot and 51 buses. The Marchwood Motorways brand was fully merged into Bluestar in 2010. As of 2023, there were 44 buses based at Totton.

=== Lymington Outpost ===
The Lymington depot is managed by Morebus, a fellow bus company within Go South Coast. All Bluestar buses operating from the Lymington outpost are maintained by Morebus, albeit in Bluestar branding. The depot operate the Bluestar 86 between Southampton and Lymington. There are 5 Bluestar branded buses at this depot.

== Competition against Black Velvet ==
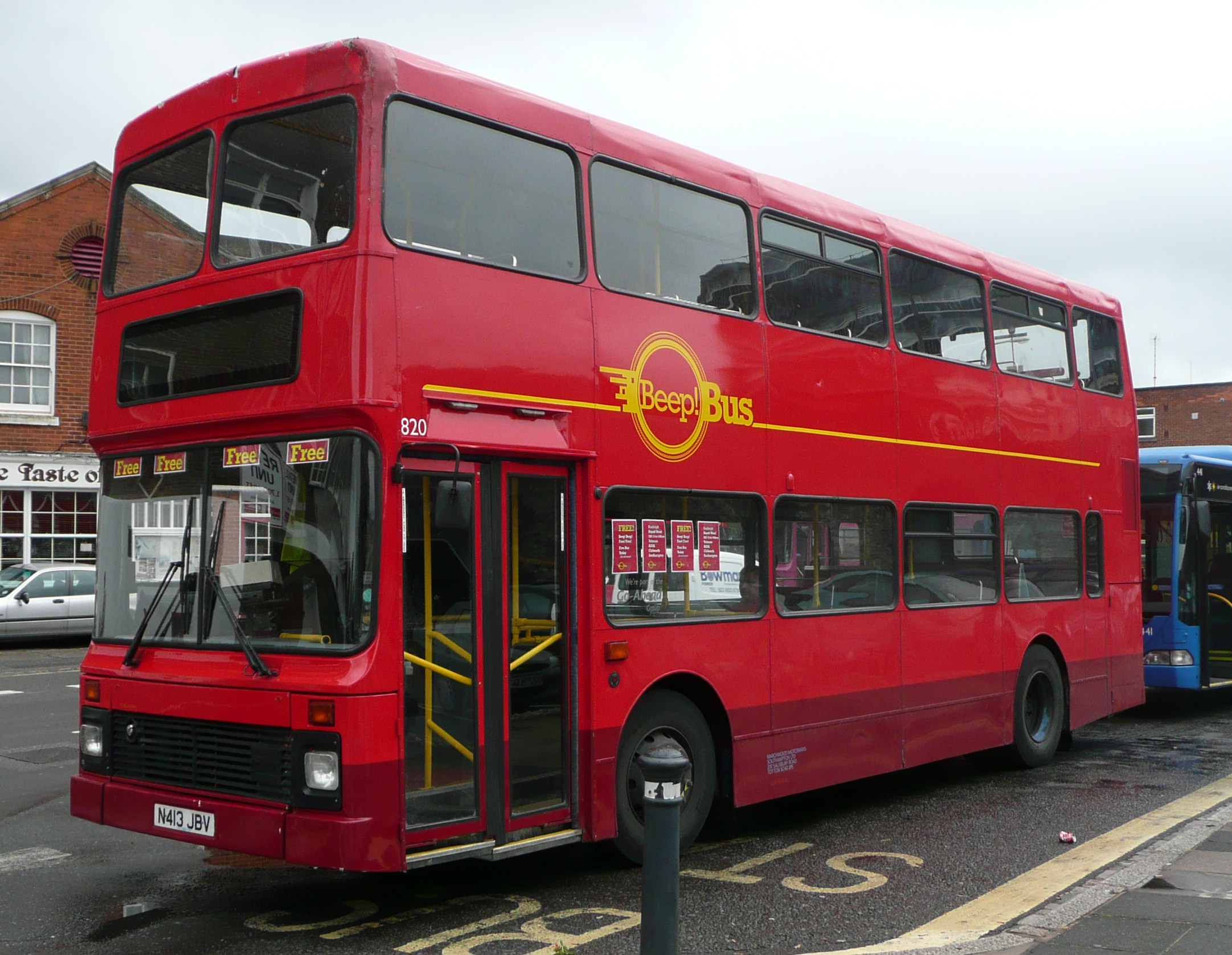
Northern Counties Palatine bodied Volvo Olympian in Beep! Bus livery in September 2008

Competition between Black Velvet and Bluestar began when the latter commenced its Beep! Bus service between Eastleigh, Boyatt Wood, Velmore and Southampton on 8 October 2008 which operated in direct competition with the rival Black Velvet B service operating on the same route and timetabled three minutes behind those of the Beep bus.

The service was initially registered as a Wilts & Dorset route to begin on 15 September 2008 with VOSA, but this was later cancelled and replaced with an identical Bluestar registration. The service began a full week before its registration date to match the start date of Black Velvet's service, but was unable to take fares and so operated as a free service until their start date a week later. Normal fares were slightly lower than Black Velvet's on some journeys but local journeys were more expensive.

Black Velvet's former managing director Phil Stockley claimed that Bluestar was being aggressive and attempted to "squeeze them out" with its new Beep buses. Bluestar operations director Andrew Wickham said that the decision was "a business decision pure and simple", adding that they "are not scared of competition" but Velvet were "deliberately creaming off" some of their passengers.

The rival Black Velvet service ended on 10 January 2009 because of low passenger numbers. However Black Velvet's managing director said that he would instead target Bluestar's more profitable services with them introducing the route 500, which would run off a similar direction to its former route B, though it would serve Chestnut Avenue before heading to Southampton; as well as the Fair Oak flyer to run between Eastleigh and Fair Oak. Bluestar then announced their intention to withdraw Beep! Bus from 22 February 2009, citing similar reasons to Black Velvet.

Black Velvet then undercut Bluestar in its bid for two college services between Eastleigh, Hiltingbury and Chandler's Ford and was awarded the contract on 19 February 2009. Bluestar operations director in response, said they would not be responding to it, claiming there was not enough passengers for one bus service let alone two.

In May 2009, the MP for Eastleigh Chris Huhne accused Bluestar's behaviour of being appalling and called for new laws to allow the local authorities to regulate bus companies. Later in July 2009, he asked for an investigation into allegations of anti-competitive behaviour of Bluestar against Velvet's over their implementation and subsequent removal of extra services, which operated between Eastleigh and Fair Oak, to rival Velvet's service, the Fair Oak Flyer. The latter service which commenced earlier in 2009 ran 55 trips per day. However, Black Velvet claimed the service became unviable when Bluestar increased the frequency on its competing route and later cancelled its service on 23 May 2009.

The competition warring between Bluestar and Black Velvet later came to an end in March 2010 when Bluestar announced frequency cuts to its route 3 between Hedge End and Botley and made a deal with the latter to run a service to fill in the axed time slot with both of them accepting each other's tickets on the same route corridor. Eastleigh Borough council was working with both companies to negotiate this deal.

== Incidents ==
- In March 2007 whilst being used as a rail-replacement bus a double-decker member of the Red Rocket fleet drove under a low bridge at Barnham causing the top to be ripped off, in addition to minor damage to the bridge. It is now with Southern Vectis as an open-topper.
- On 22 March 2011, a car drove into the front right of a Bluestar bus on route 2 between Southampton and Fair Oak, resulting in a single fatality of the car driver, and injuries to the car passenger, the bus driver was treated for shock. Only one passenger of the 10 on board the bus were treated for minor injuries.
- At around 16:30 on 7 February 2012, a Marchwood Motorways Mercedes-Benz Citaro caught fire on Calmore Roundabout, Totton. The bus was being driven Not In Service by a mechanic at the time - there were no injuries but the bus was destroyed.
- On 3 April 2012, two buses on service 18 collided at the junction of Little Lances Hill and Peartree Avenue in Bitterne. The leading bus had to brake sharply to avoid another vehicle and the second bus ran into the back of it. Three passengers were slightly injured.
- In May 2015, a similar incident to the one in 2007 occurred at Romsey, when a double-decker bus had its roof removed after colliding with a railway bridge
- On 9 October 2020, a double decker caught fire on the M27 motorway, heading towards Fareham, closing the road for an hour.
- On 26 June 2025, a double decker crashed into the River Itchen. The driver reported that the accelerator jammed down, and the brakes were not working. At the time it was on the 607 bus service to Barton Peveril Sixth Form College and had 20 people on board (including driver), 17 had injuries, and of them, 4 plus the driver were taken to hospital. The driver and one student had serious but not life-threatening injuries.

== Gallery ==
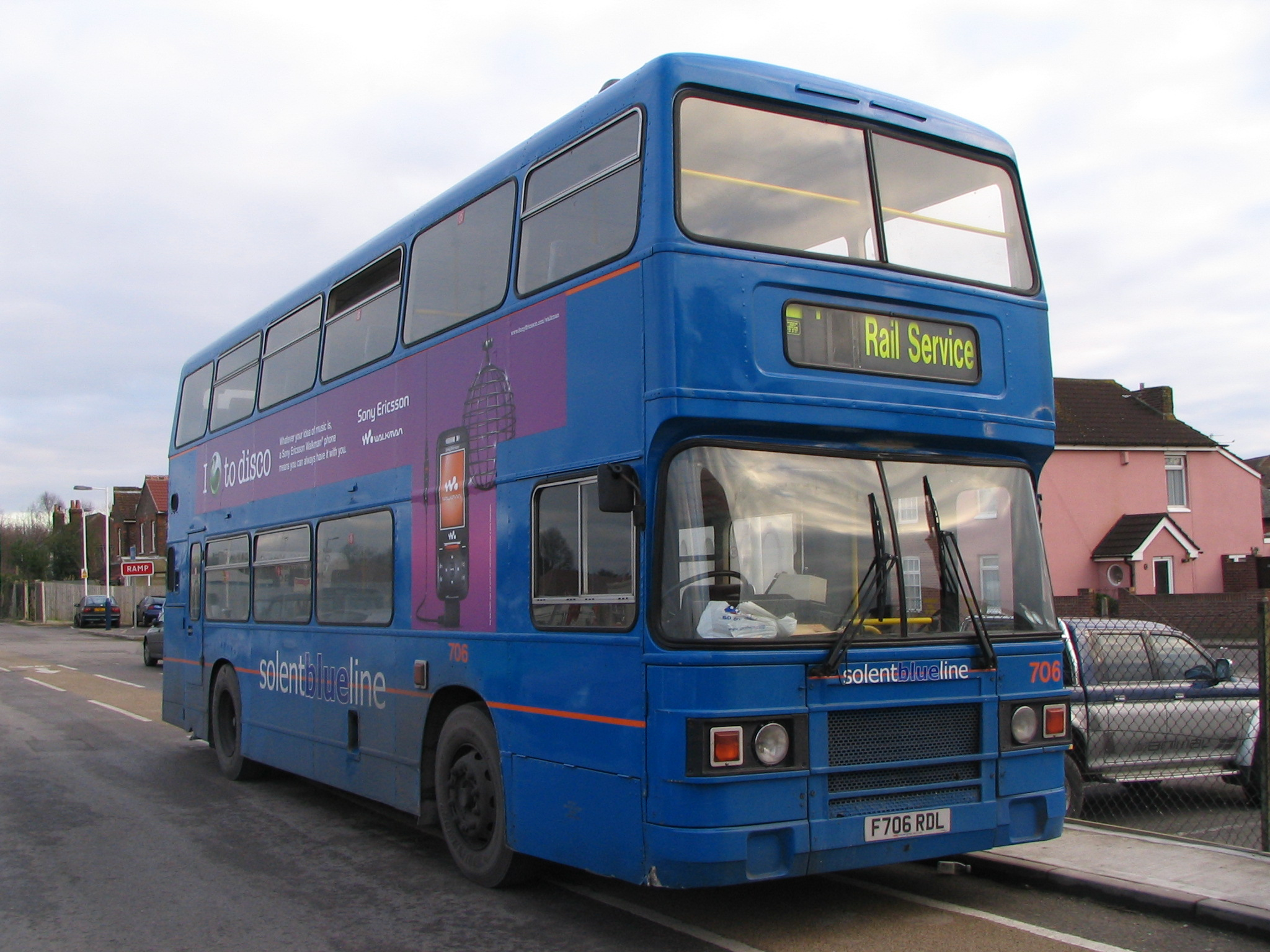
Leyland Olympian in revised Solent Blue Line livery in January 2007.

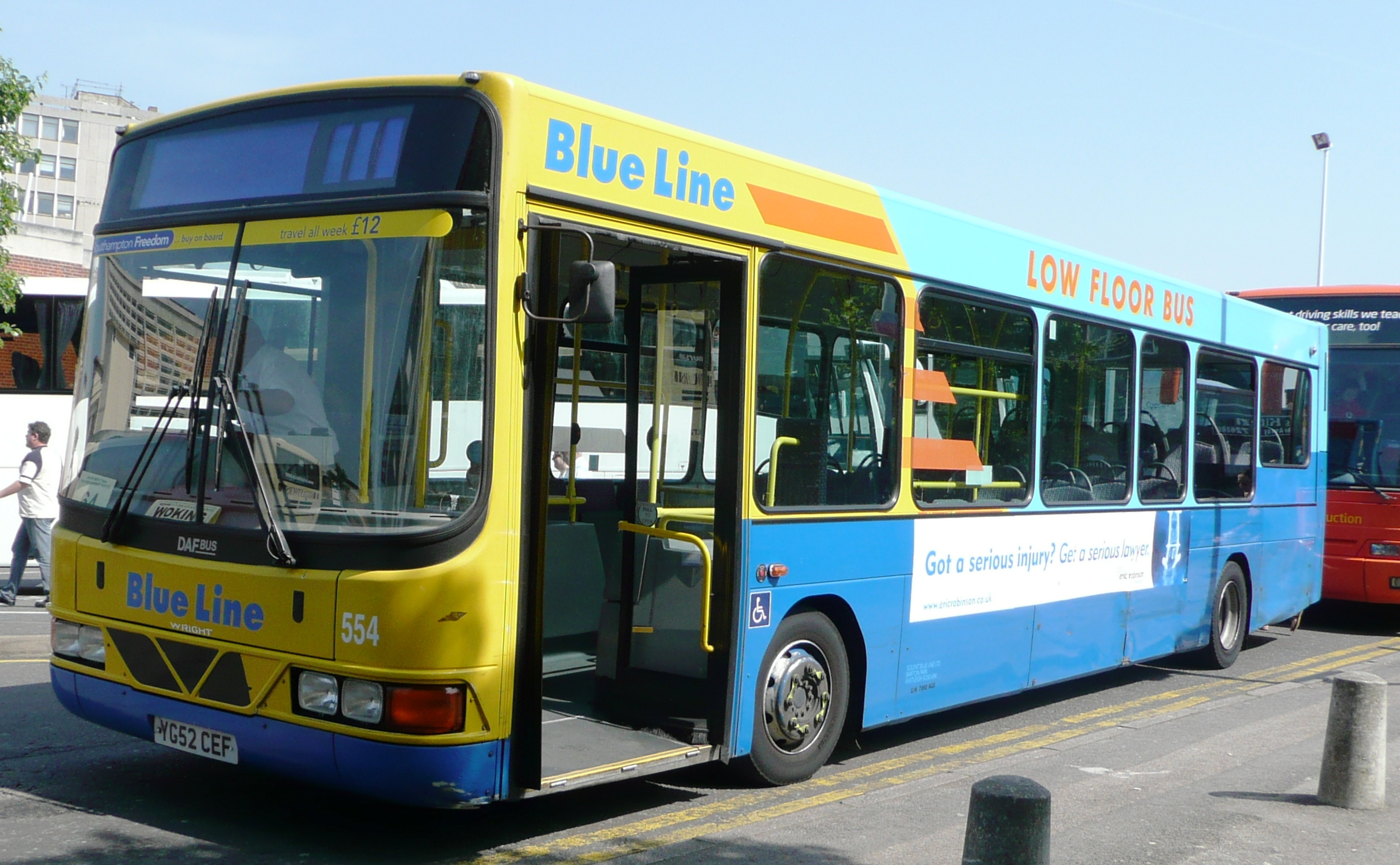
Solent Blue Line branded Wright Cadet bodied VDL SB120 in May 2008.

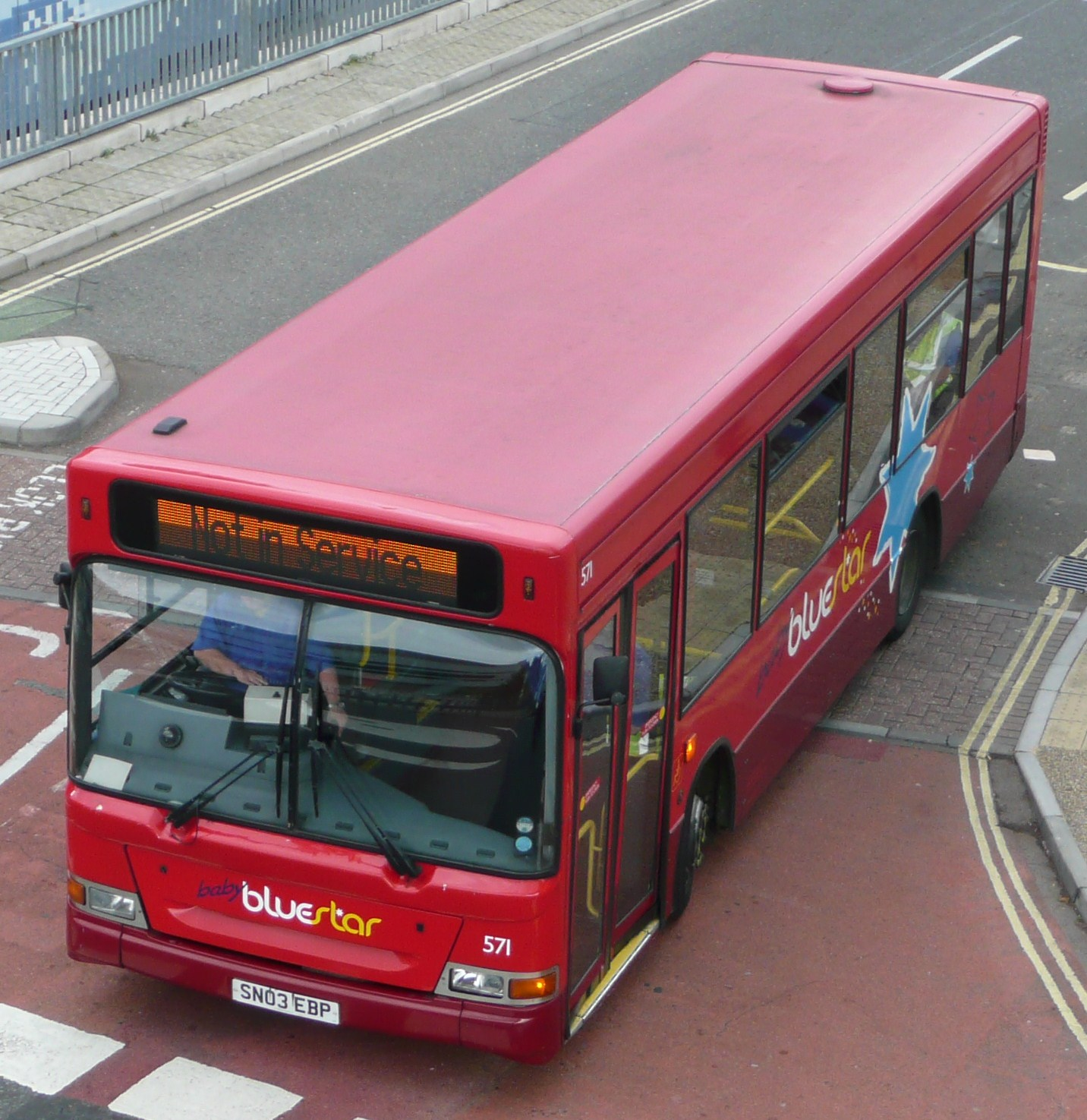
Dennis Dart in Red Rocket colours with a subsequently added Baby Bluestar logo in 2008

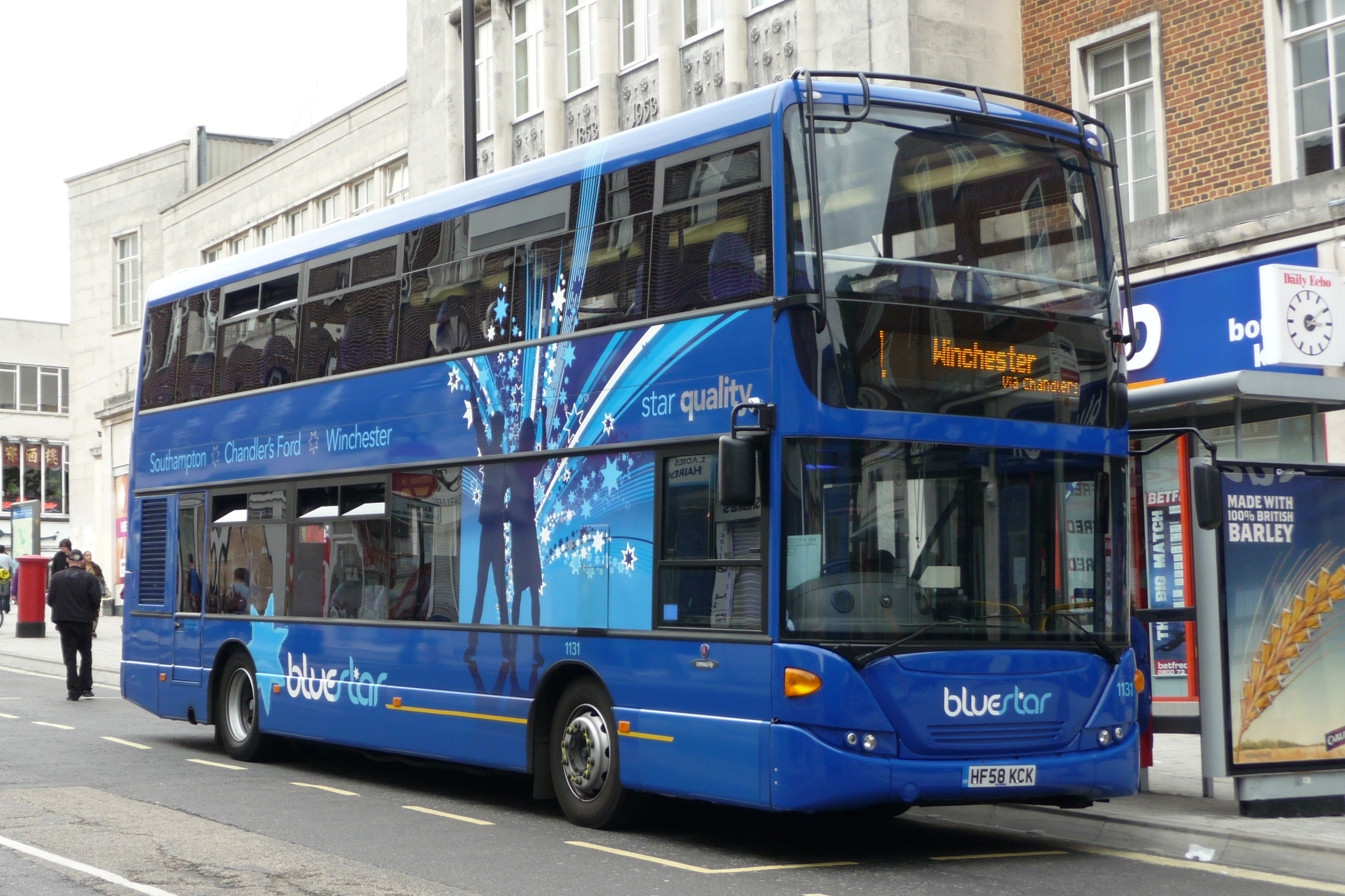
Scania OmniCity waiting at Hanover Building - May 2009.

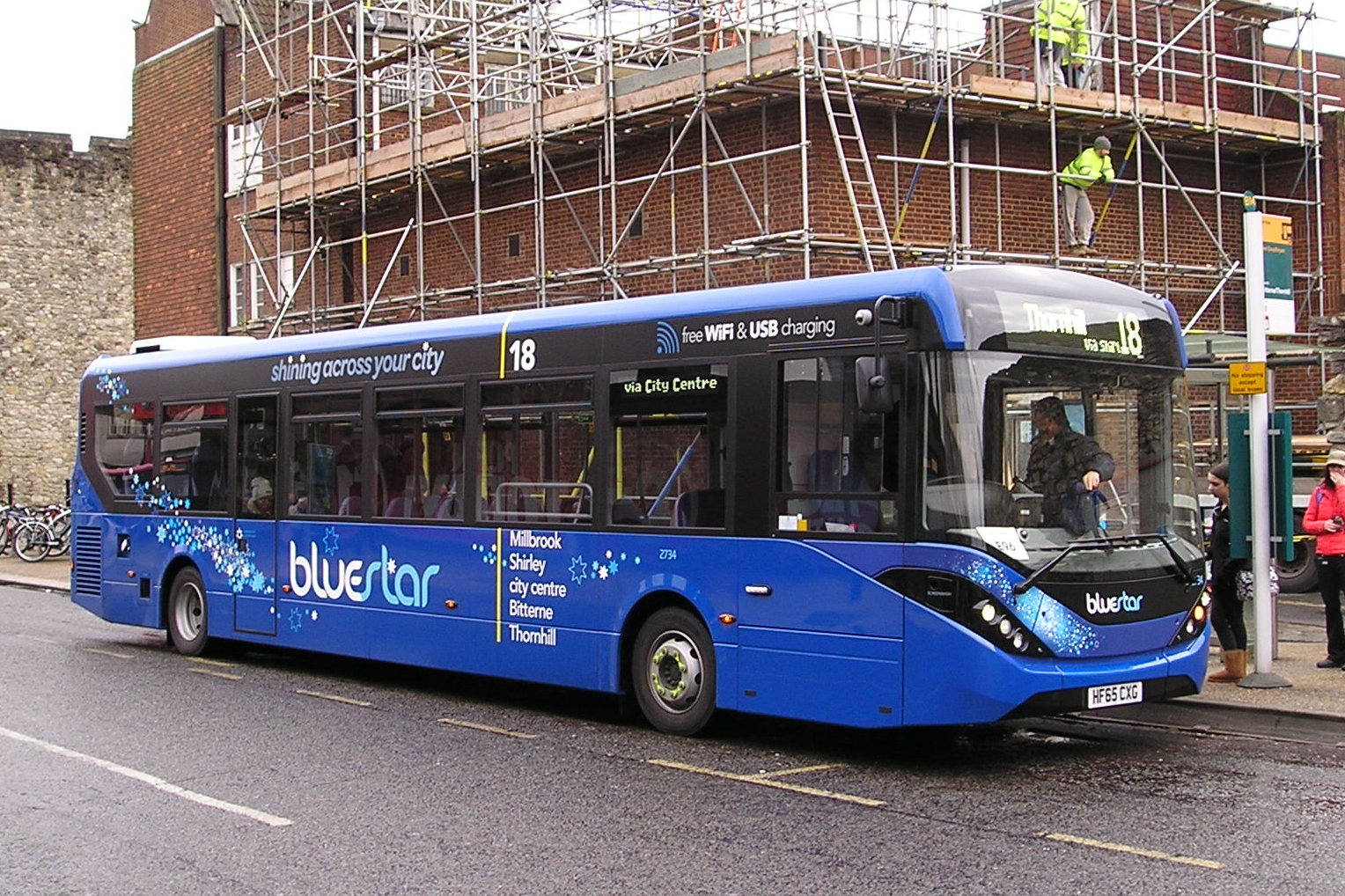
Alexander Dennis Enviro200 MMC in December 2015, this model makes up most of the single-deckers in the fleet.

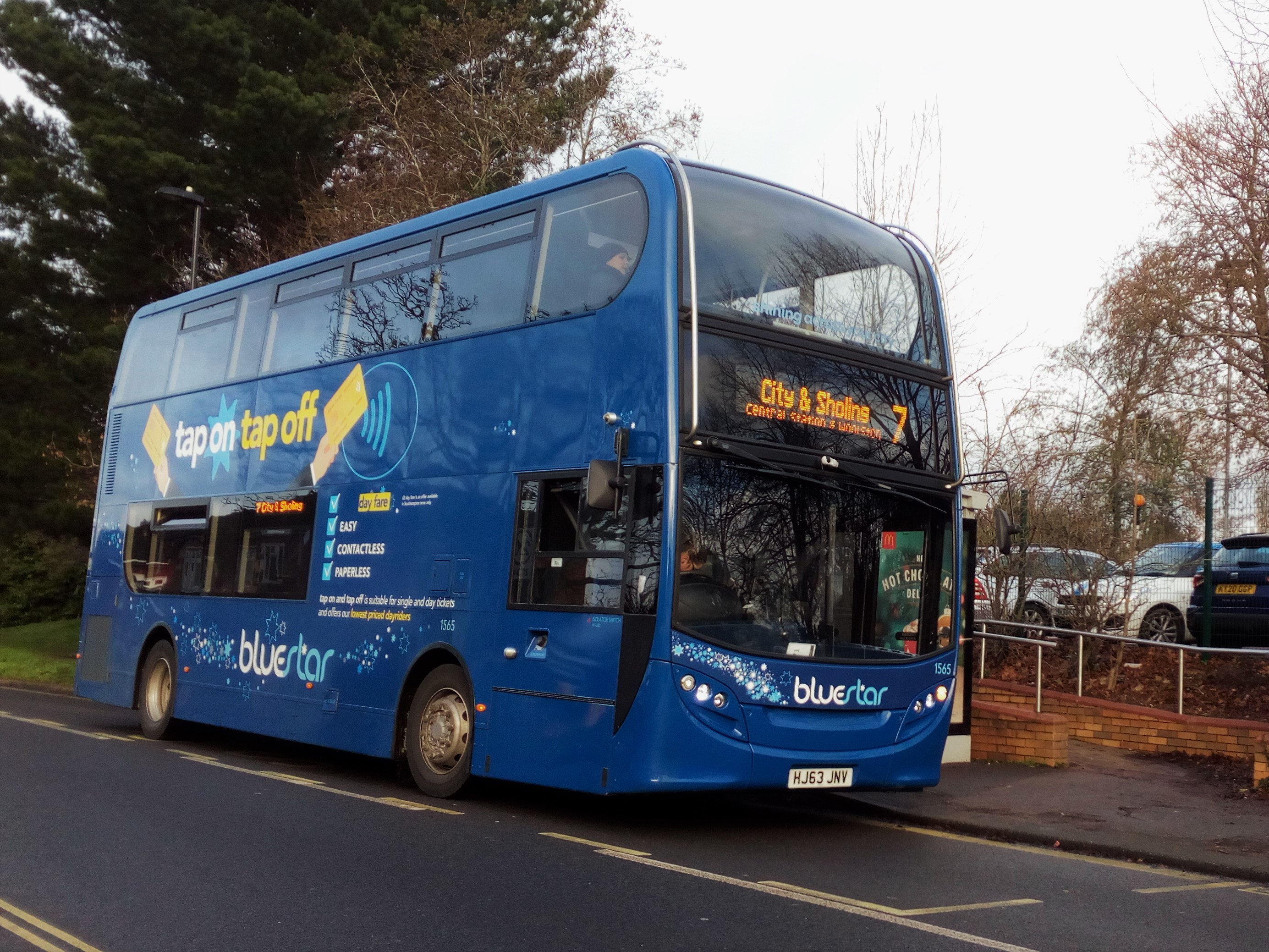
Alexander Dennis Enviro400 in January 2022, working route '7'. The Enviro400 makes up most of the fleet, albeit through different variants.

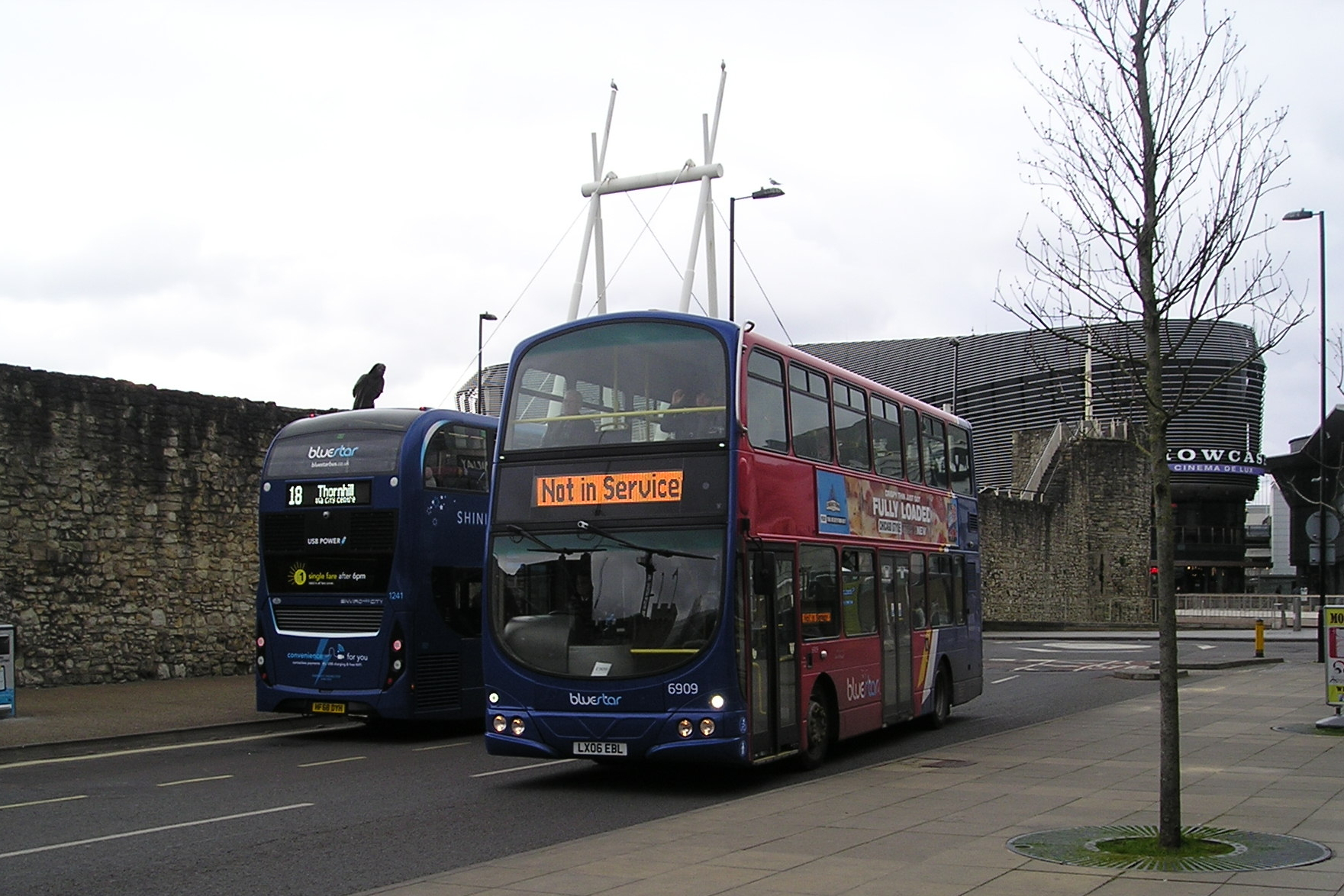
One of the emergency fleet sent to cover for the takeover of the First Southampton network, a Wright Eclipse Gemini in Southampton in February 2023.

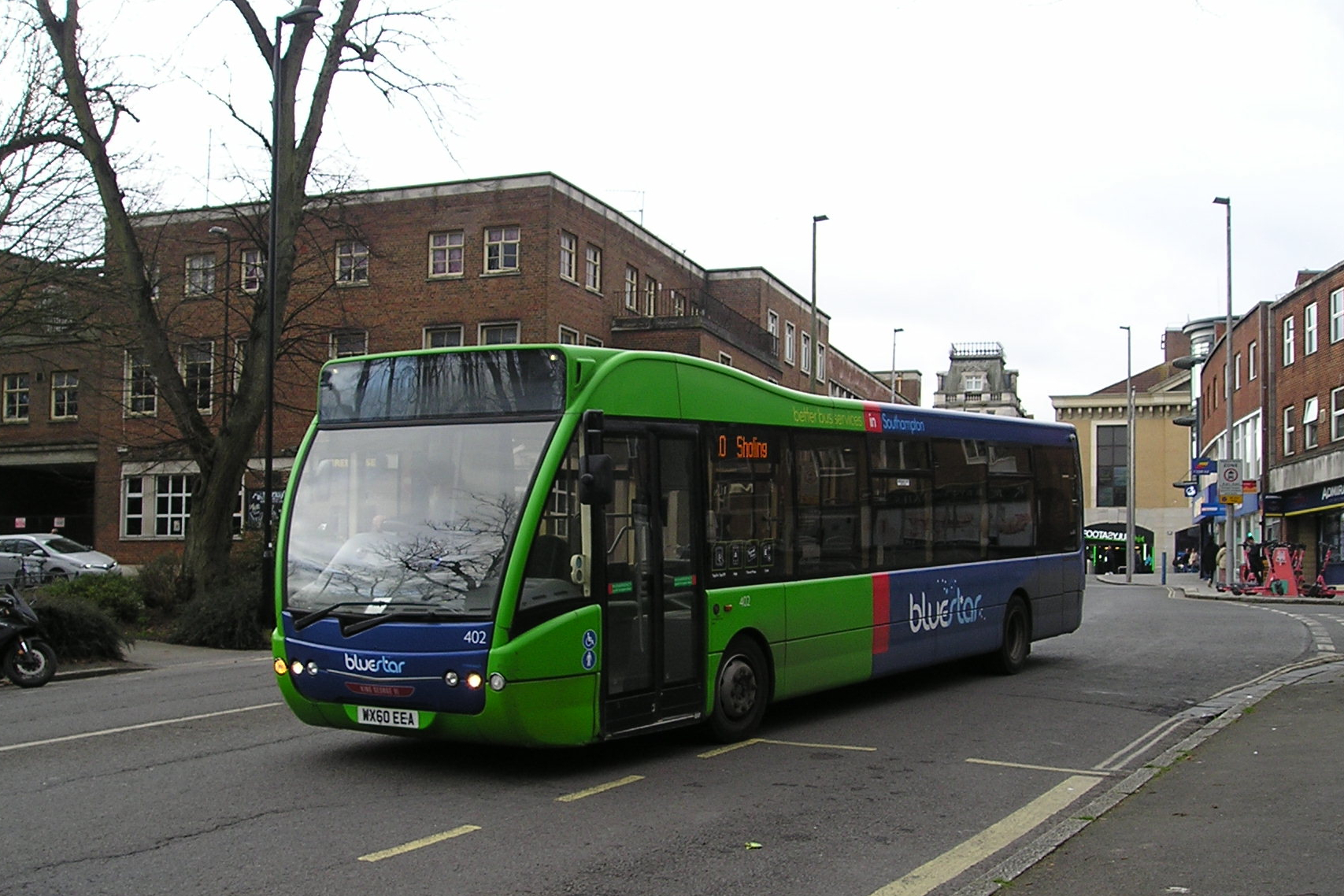
One of the emergency fleet sent to cover for the takeover of the First Southampton network, an Optare Versa brought from Swindon's Bus Company, in Southampton in February 2023.

== See also ==
- List of bus operators of the United Kingdom
